= Lee Yil =

South Korean art critic and historian (1932–1997)

- Born: Lee Jin-sik; 1932; Gangseo, Pyeongannum-do
- Died: 1997 (aged 64–65)
- Occupation: Art critic

Korean name
- Hangul: 이진식
- Hanja: 李鎭湜
- RR: I Jinsik
- MR: I Chinsik

Professional name
- Hangul: 이일
- Hanja: 李逸
- RR: I Il
- MR: I Il

Lee Yil (Korean: 이일; Hanja: 李逸; 1932–1997) was a Korean art critic and art historian. Writing predominately in Korean, but also occasionally French, the critic penned numerous texts on modern and contemporary Korean art. Lee wrote extensively on Dansaekhwa in his efforts to define contemporary Korean art within a larger global context. His citation of foreign artists, scholars, and art critics demonstrates his vested interest in bringing modern and contemporary Korean art into dialogue with the international art world, and determining the place of 20th century Korean within this broader sphere. This larger project included proposing historical periods for modern and contemporary Korean art, and coining theoretical terms like "reduction" and "expansion," which Lee would utilize in his writing for many decades.

Lee's work as a critic began in Paris writing for the Korean newspaper Chosun Ilbo while studying at the Sorbonne. Lee returned to Korea to teach at Hongik University in 1966, and contributed to a wide range of publications. In 1969, Lee joined the Korean Avant-Garde Association (AG Group), and played a crucial role in expanding contemporary art discourse in Korea by helping to produce the group's journal AG. By 1975, Lee became involved with what he later identified as Dansaekhwa by writing the introductory text for "Five Korean Artists, Five Kinds of White" held at Tokyo Gallery. Lee went on to write catalogue essays, exhibition prefaces, and reviews on Dansaekhwa artists for many years, and authored several books examining and theorizing modern and contemporary Korean art. In addition to writing, Lee sought to support the next generation of art critics by teaching at Hongik until his death in 1997, and with his work as president of the Korean Art Critics Association.

Lee was made a Knight of the Order of Arts and Letters (Ordre des arts et des lettres), and posthumously received the AICA (Association Internationale des Critiques d'Art) International Award in 2014.

== Early life ==
Lee was born in 1932 in Gangseo, Pyeonggannumdo, an area that later became part of North Korea. Lee's given name is Jin-sik (Korean: 진식, Hanja: 鎭湜), which he later changed to Yil. Lee moved with his family to South Korea after Japanese colonial rule ended.

== Education ==
Lee studied French literature at Seoul National University before heading to the Sorbonne in 1957. During his time at the Sorbonne from 1957 to 1966, Lee shifted his studies towards art history, and began working as art critic.

== Career ==
=== Early work in Paris (1963-1966) ===
==== Paris Biennale ====
It was at the 1961 Paris Biennale that Lee was first exposed to Korean Informel art that had emerged in Seoul for the past few years, and that he would later write about as a decisive turn in modern Korean art history.

Two years later, Lee began contributing to the Biennales himself by writing exhibition texts for South Korean art exhibited in the 1963 and 1965 Paris Biennales. Lee's observations at the Paris Biennales, as well as the 1963 show Les Jeunes peintres coréens (Young Korean Painters) at Galerie Lambert, helped shape his opinions on the development of the Korean art world, and exhibition of its artists abroad. In 1966, Lee wrote an essay titled "After Viewing the 15th Gukjeon: Its Unreality" critiquing the National Art Exhibition (Daehan minguk misul chollamhoe—known as Gukjeon for short) for impeding new developments in the art world with young and experimental artists.

==== Journalism ====
In 1963, Lee became a regular contributor to the Korean newspaper Chosun Ilbo covering the Parisian art world.

==== Translation ====
While in Paris in the early 60s, Lee began translating French arts criticism, and later in his career translated books by French art critics and historians like Michel Ragon and H.W. Janson.

=== Teaching work (1966-1997) ===
Lee taught art history and art criticism at Hongik University from 1966 until 1997.

=== Korean Avant-Garde Association (1969-1975) ===
Lee was a member of the Korean Avant-Garde Association (also known as AG Group). As a member of the avant-garde collective, Lee, along with fellow critics Oh Gwang-su and Kim In-hwan, played key roles in producing the group's journal AG. Lee's contributions sought to expand the geographical scope of the Korean avant-garde by drawing connections to historical European avant-garde art and post-war American art. Lee, Oh, and Kim constituted the first generation of contemporary art critics to emerge in post-war Korea.

Lee wrote the introductory texts for AG's first and third exhibitions in 1970 and 1972. Lee's writing for AG's first exhibition in 1970 titled "Dynamics of Expansion and Reduction (확장과 환원의 역학)" marked the beginning of Lee's exploration of the concepts hwaksan (확산, 擴散, expansion) and hwanwon (환원, 還原, reduction). In his exhibition preface of the same title, Lee coined these two terms that he would continue to use in his discussions of contemporary art in Korea, including those focused on Dansaekhwa. In this initial essay, Lee attempts to describe the contemporary art world as functioning under these dynamics of expansion and reduction:

Today's art appears to be concerned with unprecedented extremes, from the most fundamental of forms to events that happen in the course of everyday life, from the most direct and immediate experiences to objects that are the materialization of a concept. Making art today leaves no room for complacency, and becomes an all-out challenge to art itself. The meaning of art, in its most primary state, lies, not in its being "art" but in its being a confirmation of life. Today's art aspires to this profound significance...Art as a "transcription of anonymity" is, in itself, pure art. Art is reduced to its most fundamental self, and yet, at the same time expands into a condition of life before art was "art." What lies in between such "expansion and reduction" is neither history nor a dialectic, but there is nevertheless a dynamics of the total and true meaning of existence, as true creation lies in awakening to awareness of existence.

Lee was also the commissioner of the 1974 Seoul Biennale that AG modeled after the Paris Biennale.

=== Dansaekhwa (1975-1990s) ===
Lee became one of the leading voices in art historical writing and arts criticism on Dansaekhwa after helping to organize what many curators and art historians now consider as the first major Dansaekhwa exhibition: "Five Korean Artists, Five Kinds of White" held at Tokyo Gallery in 1975. Lee wrote the exhibition preface titled "Thinking White?", hailing the show as the first large-scale exhibition of modern Korean art in Japan, and major moment in the history of Korean abstract painting. In the essay, Lee focuses on the color white as a symbol of Korean culture embedded with cosmological significance that extends beyond the sensorial. He argues that white is not simply a pigment (Lee does mention that classical Korean art frequently incorporates bright hues), but rather gestures to the spiritual realm.

In 1978, Lee proclaimed Dansaekhwa the defining artistic styles of the 1970s in Korea. Lee would go on to write numerous catalogue essays and reviews for the shows of a number of artists identified as part of Dansaekhwa, including Park Seo-bo, Kim Tschang-yeul, and Lee Dong-youb.

Art historian Joan Kee claims that Lee honed in on Dansaekhwa as a prime example of a uniquely Korean artistic style that would appeal to international audiences, even though Lee was acutely aware that doing so would in turn highlight Korea's place on the cultural periphery. But Kee points out that Lee and others in the Korean art world had little alternative if they wanted to engage with the art world on a global scale, and Lee's later writing evinced reservations about this tactic given that it became the dominant interpretation of Dansaekhwa.

Kee also notes that by 1980, Lee had stepped back from his emphasis on the importance of the color white to Korean culture for Dansaekhwa artists, and instead asserted monochrome painting's "return to that which is basic."

=== Korean Art Critics Association (1986-1992) ===
Lee was president of the Korean Art Critics Association (한국미술평론가협회, hanguk misul pyeongnon gahyeopoe) from 1986 to 1992.

=== Korean Pavilion at the Venice Biennale (1995) ===
Lee was the commissioner of the Korean Pavilion for the 46th Venice Biennale in 1995. For the inaugural exhibition of the newly opened pavilion, Lee invited artists Yun Hyong-keun, Kim In-kyum, Kwak Hoon, and Jheon Soocheon.

=== Posthumous exhibitions ===
In 1998, the Whanki Museum held an exhibition commemorating the critic's death.

A recent exhibition on the history of Lee Yil's work in relation to members of the AG Group, titled "비평가 이일과 1970년대 AG그룹 (Bipyeongga iilgwa 1970 nyeondae AG geurup)" ran from May 10, 2023 to June 24, 2023 at Space 21. The show was curated by Hongik University professor Yeon Shim Chung.

== Major theoretical contributions ==
=== Expansion and Reduction ===
After initially using the terms in his 1970 AG exhibition text, Lee later used them to classify that period of contemporary Korean art from 1968 to the mid-1970s. This stage of "reduction and expansion" in the history of Korean art was led by artists in the AG group who sought to either reduce formal language or expand the concept of art. Lee has also used "reduction and expansion" to describe the shift from minimalism to new painting in the late 1970s, and modernism to postmodernism.

=== Periodization of contemporary Korean art ===
In a number of essays, Lee has offered the following breakdown of the stages of contemporary Korean Art:

late 1950s - 1965: Informel (Abstract Expressionism)

1968 - mid-1970s: Reduction and Expansion

mid 1970s - 1980s: Third Period Abstraction (Post Minimalism)

late 1970s - 1980s: New-Imagism

The first period includes artists from the Contemporary Artists Association (e.g. Kim Tschang-yeol, Ha In-doo, Kim Seo-bong) and 1960 Artists Association (e.g. Yoon Myeong-ro, Kim Jong-hak, Kim Bong-tae). The second was led by members of AG. Third Period Abstraction is exemplified by Dansaekhwa. The fourth period signaled a push against art institutions by groups like Reality & Utterance, and later by Minjung artists.

=== Unique development of Korean art ===
==== Role of traditional Korean culture ====
Lee expounded the necessity of "rediscovering" tradition in order to further develop contemporary Korean art, and saw traditional Korean culture as a means of establishing the uniqueness of Korean culture within an international art world.

==== Trans-modernism ====
Lee distinguished Korean modern art from modernist art coming out of Europe and the US, arguing that while modernism in Europe and the US was founded on perspective and Western rationalism, modern artists in Korea have an alternative conception of space that extends into the spiritual realm. Lee proposed the term "trans-modernism" instead to describe the shift towards abstract art in the 80s in Korea that sought to establish a uniquely Korean version of European and American modernism.

==== Pan-naturalism ====
Lee uses the term "pan-naturalism" in his essay for the 1992 Tate Liverpool exhibition of Chung Chang-sup, Yun Hyong-keun, Park Seo-bo, Kim Tschang-yeul, Lee Kang-so, and Lee Ufan's work in order to differentiate the Korean approach to nature from that in Europe and the US. Lee often invoked the idea of pan-naturalism when writing about Dansaekhwa.

==== Criticism ====
As Lee continued to assert the Koreanness of contemporary Korean work, artists and critics like Redza Piyadasa pushed against Lee's emphasis on artistic style defined by nationality, asking why "we are still on the stage of 'Is my Minimalism Malaysian? Is your Minimalism Korean?'"

=== Institutional support ===
For decades, Lee advocated for an expanded role for arts institutions in participating in the contemporary art world domestically and internationally. In a 1981 article, Lee critiqued the conservative bureaucratic hold over the National Museum of Modern and Contemporary Art and Gukjeon, and called for increased exhibitions of foreign artists in Korea.

== Publications ==
- Hyeondaemisurui gwejeok (현대미술의 궤적, The Trajectory of Contemporary Art) (1974)
- Hangukmisul, geu oneului eolgul (한국미술, 그 오늘의 얼굴, The Face of Korean Art Now) (1982)
- Hyeondaemisureseoui hwanwongwa hwaksan, (현대미술에서의 환원과 확산, Reduction and Expansion in Contemporary Art) (1991)
- Seoyangmisurui Gyebo (서양미술의 계보, The Genealogy of Western Art) (1992)

== Awards ==
- Knight of the Order of Arts and Letters (Ordre des arts et des lettres)
- AICA (Association Internationale des Critiques d'Art) International Award (2014)
