= Dansaekhwa =

Korean painting movement

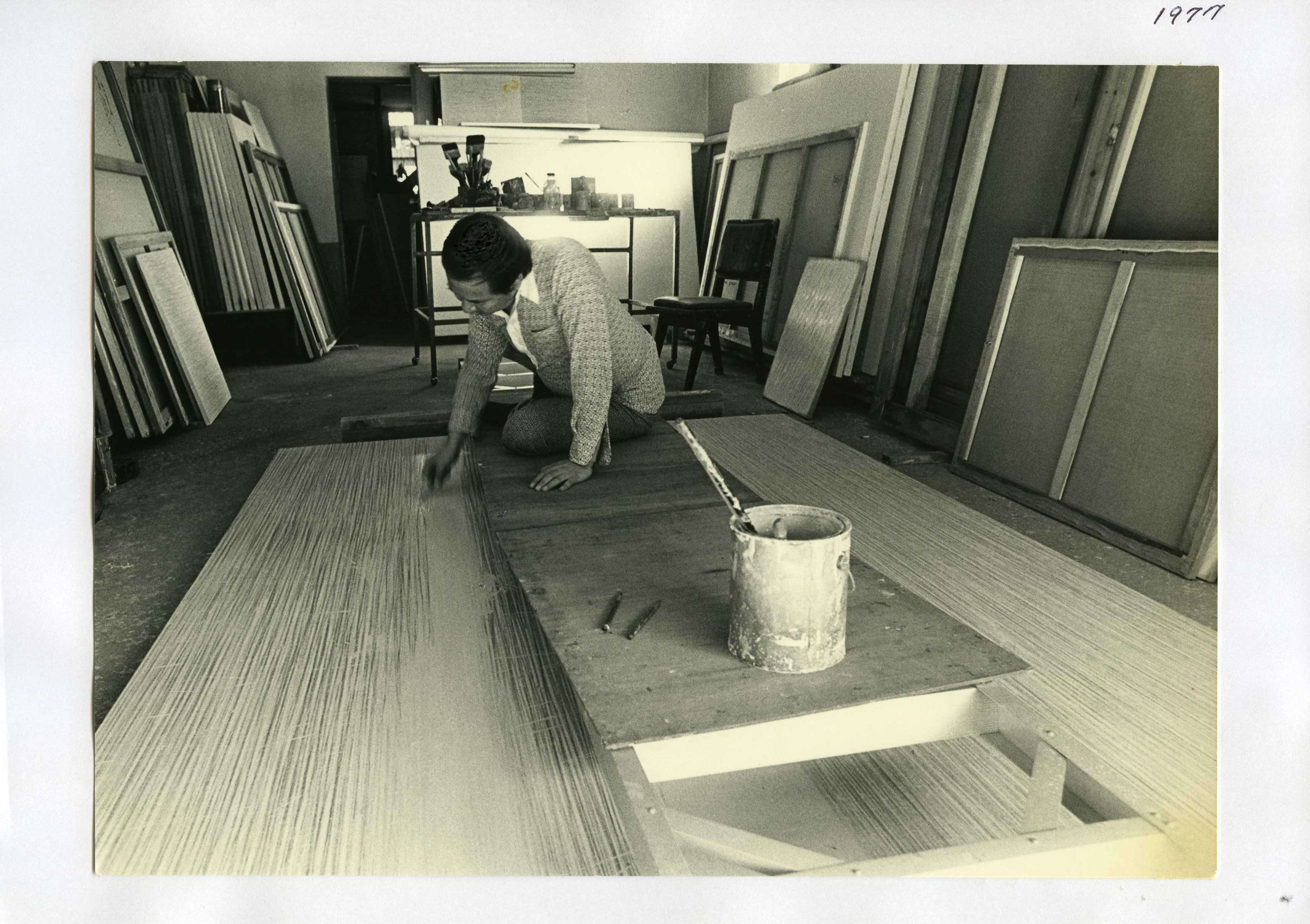
Park Seo-Bo working on an Ecriture piece at his Hapjeong-dong studio, 1977

Dansaekhwa (Korean: 단색화, hanja 單色畵, also known as Tansaekhwa), often translated as "monochrome painting" from Korean, is a retroactive term grouping together disparate artworks that were exhibited in South Korea beginning in the mid 1970s. While the wide range of artists whose work critics and art historians consider to fall under this category are often exhibited together, they were never part of an official artistic movement nor produced a manifesto. Nonetheless, their artistic practices are seen to share "a commitment to thinking more intensively about the constituent elements of mark, line, frame, surface and space around which they understood the medium of painting." Their interests compose a diverse set of formal concerns that cannot be reduced to a preference for limited color palettes.

Dansaekhwa ignited a series of debates on how to define and understand not only Dansaekhwa, but contemporary Korean art as a whole. It was at the center of discussions in Korea during the latter half of the 20th century on how to narrativize a history of Korean abstract art connected to, but distinct from the rest of the world. Promoted in Seoul, Tokyo, and Paris, Dansaekhwa grew to be the international face of contemporary Korean art and a cornerstone of contemporary Asian art.

Artists associated with Dansaekhwa include Cho Yong-ik, Choi Myoung Young, Choi Byung-so, Chung Chang-sup, Chung Sang-Hwa, Ha Chong Hyun, Hur Hwang, Kim Guiline, Kim Tschang-yeul, Kwon Young-woo, Lee Dong-Youb, Lee Kang-so, Lee Seung-jio, Lee Ufan, Park Kwang-Jin, Park Seo-Bo, Suh Seung-Won, and Yun Hyong-keun.

== Terminology ==
Dansaekhwa is only one of a number of terms used to describe the set of works that have been identified as falling under this rubric. Other terms include dansaekpa (monochromatic wave), "white painting," "monochrome painting" (translation used instead of the transliteration), and "monotone school." Art historian Kim Mikyung has advocated for the replacement of Dansaekhwa with dansaek-jo hoehwa (monotone painting) to signal the artists' use of one tone of color rather than a single color. Curators of the 2014 show "Overcoming the Modern: Dansaekhwa: The Korean Monochrome Movement" (Alexander Gray Associates, New York) Sam Bardaouil and Till Fellrath have proposed the term "process" rather than "monochrome" to emphasize the physicality rather than color palette of Dansaekhwa works.

Curator Yoon Jin Sup attributes the origin of the dominant use of the English transliteration "Dansaekhwa" rather than the translation "Korean Monochrome Painting" to his writing for "A Facet of Modern Korean and Japanese Art." He chose to use the transliteration in the catalogue for the exhibition on Dansaekhwa and Mono-ha held at the Gwangju Museum of Art in 2000. A 2017 collection of primary documents on Dansaekhwa published by the Korea Arts Management Service (KAMS) also credits the use of "Dansaekhwa" in the international art world to this show.Art historian Joan Kee has opted for the romanization "Tansaekhwa" instead because the McCune–Reischauer system is still in use for English-language databases, archives, and libraries when identifying Korean-language sources.

== History ==
=== Rise: late 1960s – 1970s ===
==== Broader historical context ====
Dansaekhwa artists were born during Japan's occupation of Korea, and began building their careers during the turmoil of multiple military conflicts (most significantly the division of Korea and the Korean War), and authoritarian regimes of the 60s and 70s. Joan Kee emphasizes the importance of understanding this context in relation to Dansaekhwa, arguing that the artists' emphasis on objecthood was informed by both a history of material dispossession during the Korean War and anxieties around further loss with the suspension of civil liberties in postwar Korea. Dansaekhwa's questions around form grappled with the limits of representation and agency under the Yushin Constitution.

Their material focus also reveals a keen awareness of the rapid industrialization and architectural transformation of the country, evident in, for example, Ha Chong Hyun's piercing of canvases with wire. Ha's writing on the state of Korean contemporary art in the 60s and 70s underlines the influence of urban architecture and dominance of mass production on Korean art in the 20th century.

==== Art historical context ====
The tumult of postwar Korea was in some ways mirrored in the discourse around art, especially in discussions on the role of abstraction. Experimental and avant-garde artists clamored for institutional support that would reflect the major changes occurring in the Korean art world, and provide emerging artists a platform to show their work. But unlike the contemporary artists who sought to change the Korean art world through organized collectives and manifestos, Dansaekhwa artists did not band together to create a new artistic movement. A number of Dansaekhwa artists were active in the late 1950s - mid 1960s Art Informel movement in Korea, and Park Seo-Bo traces the tendency to use a limited color palette in Dansaekhwa back to the movement. However, after the Korean Art Informel movement, many of the artists did not participate in avant-garde movements that followed in the late 1960s and 70s initiated by groups like the 1967 Young Artists Coalition, and later A.G. (Avant-garde) and S.T. (Space & Time). Dansaekhwa artists separated themselves from and stood in contrast to younger generations of artists like those in the Young Artists Coalition, A.G., and S.T. who turned away from established practices in painting to focus on installation and performance. Dansaekhwa artists' lack of involvement aligns with Yoon Jin Sup's argument that the rise of Dansaekhwa was in some part a response to the rejection of two-dimensional surfaces common to many of the 60s and 70s avant-garde movements in Korea. While the dominant art historical opinion has been that the Informel generation used Dansaekhwa in the 70s and 80s to regain their status, Yoon claims that their resistance to these groups signified a crisis for their own.

Without, as Lee Ufan describes an "-ism," or movement, to guide it, Dansaekhwa artists instead busied themselves with formal concerns that unsettled the boundaries between abstraction and figuration, painting and sculpture, tradition and modernity, and local and global. Their focus on material rejected these sharp aesthetic divisions. A few artists who spent time abroad like Kwon Young-woo argued for the deemphasis of the distinction between painting from the East versus the West, arguing that attempts to distinguish paintings as belonging to one or the other usually rely on superficial differences based on medium or the image in the work. Some of the earliest Dansaekhwa artists began experimenting with a wide range of materials that rejected painterly traditions, but also emerged out of a lack of resources in postwar Korea and rising oil prices.In spite of the difficulty in obtaining and linguistic mediation of information on art from outside Korea in the 60s and 70s, Korean artists began thinking about their connection to a global art world, and how they might shape it.

==== Exhibitions and institutional support ====
The early 1970s saw a series of exhibitions, such as the "White Exhibition" (Myeongdong Gallery, Seoul, 1972-3), "The Korean Modern Art Union Exhibition" (1973), and "Park Seo-Bo: Ecriture" (Muramatus Gallery, Tokyo; Myeongdong Gallery, Seoul, 1973), that critic Oh Kwang-su identified as being part of a trend moving away from experimental sculpture and installation to painting characterized by an "absence of image." Oh later declared the "École de Seoul" exhibitions at the National Museum of Modern and Contemporary Art beginning in 1975 as best representing Dansaekhwa. These exhibitions featured artists who would later be identified as part of Dansaekhwa, and evinced a shift in Korean contemporary art towards the style of Dansaekhwa.

Curators and art historians often credit "Five Korean Artists, Five Kinds of White," a 1975 group show held at Tokyo Gallery organized by director Yamamoto Takashi with the support of Kim Mun-ho, the owner of Myeongdong Gallery, art critics Nakahara Yusuke and Lee Yil, and Lee Ufan, as the first major exhibition of works that were later identified as part of Dansaekhwa. The five featured artists were Kwon Young-woo, Park Seo-Bo, Suh Seung-Won, Lee Dong-Youb, and Hur Hwang. Yamamoto and Nakahara's impetus for the show was an interest in the artists' use of white, and expansive understanding of color that is distinct from Euro-American modern art movements. While many hark back to this show when creating a timeline for Dansaekhwa, art historian Koo Jin-Kyung suggests that the 1972 "White" exhibition at Myeondong Gallery was a predecessor to and model for the 1975 Tokyo Gallery show. Yisoon Kim on the other hand attributes the origins of Dansaekhwa to the solo shows of Park Seo-Bo, Kwon Young-woo, Yun Hyong-keun, and Ha Chong Hyun at Myeongdong Gallery from 1973 to 1974. Myeongdong Gallery became one of the main exhibitors of Dansaekhwa in large part due to Kim's willingness to allow young experimental artists to show in the space for free. It was also the home of the first show historicizing postwar Korean abstract art.

In addition to Yamamoto, Nakahara, and Myeongdong Gallery, Lee Ufan attributes the growing interest in and development of Dansaekhwa to himself as an intermediary between Korea and Japan, and Park Seo-Bo as the central figure in Korea. After moving to Japan in 1956, and living between Paris and Kamakura from the early 1970s onwards, Lee played a significant role in promoting Dansaekhwa artists so that they could show their work in Japan and France. But Lee claims that Dansaekhwa would have been impossible without Park's mediation between institutions and artists to allocate resources from the former to the latter. Park's position as first the vice chairman (1970–77) and then chairman (1977-1980) of the International Division of the Korea Fine Art Association allowed him to organize large-scale exhibitions of experimental art that kickstarted the careers of emerging experimental artists and provided the crucial visibility needed for avant-garde artists to enter the international art arena. As a result, the Ministry of Culture and Public Information-organized National Art Exhibition (Daehan minguk misul chollamhoe—known as Kukchon for short) no longer functioned as the main stage for exhibiting young Korean artists. Media coverage and public interest instead shifted towards these experimental and international exhibitions.These efforts prompted major changes in the Korean art world to the relief of avant-garde artists like Ha Chong Hyun who critiqued the cronyism, poor management, and conservatism that favored informel over abstract art.

The increasing number of exhibitions of and growing interest in Dansaekhwa artists prompted Nakahara to state in the 1977 exhibition catalogue for "Korea: Facet of Contemporary Modern Art" (Tokyo Central Museum of Art) that anti-chromatic art had proliferated in Korea to the point that it had become a movement. Many Dansaekhwa artists were regularly showing in institutions outside of Korea by that time. A number of Dansaekhwa artists also spent time abroad, including Lee Ufan who went to Japan in 1956, Kim Tschang-yeul who went to New York in 1965 and then Paris in 1969, and Chung Sang-Hwa who moved to Paris in 1967, Japan in 1969, and then back to France in 1977. Their work abroad, and for figures like Lee, promotion of Dansaekhwa art abroad, led to Dansaekhwa's growing international popularity.

=== Institutionalization and popularization: 1980s ===
By the 1980s, Dansaekhwa became the face of Korean modern art, resulting in a number of the artists taking on leadership and teaching roles in art associations and universities, and being spared from government censorship. Dansaekhwa's preeminence was propelled by Korea's rapid economic growth that allowed for the expansion of the Korean domestic art scene with new museums, galleries, arts publications, and fairs, and by the increase in international visibility with the Asian Games and Olympics held in the country in 1986 and 1988 respectively.

==== Political cooptation ====
Some art historians have interpreted Dansaekhwa artists' lack of figuration as a form of defiance against the figuration that was dominant in political propaganda. Nonetheless, Dansaekhwa's unique status as a distinctly Korean style led to its cooptation as a soft power tool for the state. The Ministry of Culture and Information sponsored Dansaekhwa artists for shows like the 1978 "Secondes Rencontres Internationales d'Art Contemporain" in Paris. This led to criticism from both Korean writers and artists. The state's promotion of Dansaekhwa in the 70s and 80s that deemphasized its political valences placed it in discursive opposition to the 1980s Minjung art movement. It spurred a debate in the Korean art world on how to define Korean modern art in relation to the global art world and through style (realism vs. abstraction), and compelled younger artists who did not want to fall into either camp to create their own collectives and movements.

==== On the international stage ====
Curator Alexandra Munroe argues that Dansaekhwa's simultaneity with other conceptualist and Postminimalist movements across the world drew Korean contemporary art out of the periphery that the Euro-American art world had relegated it to, defying the assumption of belatedness in artistic innovation typically assigned to contemporary Asian art. Monroe believes Dansaekhwa can be considered an example of "alternative modernism" that drew from but cannot be reduced to contemporary art movements from abroad that Korean artists were exposed to. Dansaekhwa artists drew aesthetic strategies from a real and imagined Korean past to create a definition of modernism for themselves that was distinct from the West and Japan.

Yoon Jin Sup believes that the recent interest in Dansaekhwa in the global art world is partially due to its aesthetic qualities unique to South Korea, such as an attention to spirituality, materiality, and performativity.

=== Legacy: 1990s - 2010s ===
The national and international interest in Dansaekhwa has led to exhibitions showing the work of second-generation Dansaekhwa artists and art historical efforts to document its history.

==== Next generation ====
Critic Seo Seongrok describes the participants of the 1994 "Monochromes after the Monochromes" exhibition at the Whanki Museum, such as Choi Insun, Park Youngha, Kim Tschoonsu, Yoon Myung-Jae, Han Myung-ho, and Han Chung-uk, as part of the "post-monochrome" generation that would revitalize and expand on the work of their predecessors. In addition to Kim Tschoonsu, Yoon Jin Sup counts Koh Sankeum, Noh Sankyoon, Moon Beom, Cheon Kwangyep, Nam Tchunmo, Jang Seungtaik, Lee Kang-So, Kim Tae-Ho, Kim Taeksang, Park Kiwon, Ahn Jungsook, Lee Bae, and Lee Inheyon among late Dansaekhwa artists.

==== Historicization ====
Since the early 2000s, scholars and curators have attempted to construct a history for Dansaekhwa. Art historian Chung Moojeong has identified one show and text in particular as marking the beginning of these efforts: "The Age of Philosophy and Aesthetics" (National Museum of Modern and Contemporary Art, 2002) and the foreword to this exhibition, "Korean Monochrome and Its Identity," by Oh Kwang-su. The show and essay are two of many offering their own timelines and cast of characters. Some have sought to draw new connections or find predecessors for Dansaekhwa, including Kim Whanki and Quac Insik, and identify the main actors in promoting the movement. Yoon Jin Sup claims that rather than a native Korean, a foreigner, Tokyo Gallery director Takashi Yamamoto, was the first to discover Dansaekhwa.

In addition to outlining the history of Dansaekhwa, some have called for a reevaluation of the conceptual frameworks used to understand the art associated with it. Critic Kim Chan-dong asserts that outdated concepts such as "the indifference of nature" and theorization around the importance of the color white in Korean culture, and reliance on the perspectives of prominent artists in Dansaekhwa have stagnated discourse on Dansaekhwa. Kim calls for the diversification of viewpoints and construction of new frameworks when analyzing Dansaekhwa.

In 2013, the University of Minnesota Press published the first English-language academic book on Dansaekhwa: Contemporary Korean Art: Tansaekhwa and the Urgency of Method by Joan Kee. Kee employs formalist readings of Dansaekhwa work to show how these artists were engaged with the outside world, challenging aesthetic parameters that were indelibly marked by the rapid social and political changes in Korea during the time:

Tansaekhwa was not about the mastery of technique, the transmission of meaning, or even the manipulation of materials. Its makers were primarily concerned with bringing together certain materials and material properties so as to break the painting down. Potentially this opened up room for the reconstruction of a different narrative of painting, one less indebted to reified sets of distinctions founded on particular systems of order and belief repeated over a given period. Thus, in calling tansaekhwa works 'methods,' critics like Lee and Yi inadvertently called for viewers to recognize the degree to which these works were themselves methods of being present outside those systems of order whose seeming dominance relied on their dual claims to historicity and perpetuity.

In 2017, the Korea Arts Management Service (KAMS) published a compilation of primary documents spanning 1960s to the 2010s on Dansaekhwa. The introduction to the volume describes the difficulty and disagreement in determining which artists should be included, and the terminology that should be used. Of particular note is co-editor Lee Phil's acknowledgement of their inability to find primary sources on women artists who were active during the period, and call for future scholars to search for this missing component. However, an excerpt of a journal article by Yun Nanjie offers a broad picture of the role of women in popularizing Dansaekhwa by organizing shows or working as art dealers. Yun also lists a few women artists who were exhibited together with Dansaekhwa artists, including Chin Ohcsun, Lee Hyangmi, and Shin Okjoo in the 70s, and Lee Chungji, Yoon Miran, and Lee Myungmi in the 80s.

In response to curatorial and art historical attempts to identify Dansaekhwa artists, some artists have pushed against their inclusion. Lee Kang-so and Choi Byung-so have rejected the association, stating that the categorization misunderstands both their own work and characteristics of Dansaekhwa.

== Some shared characteristics ==
=== Physicality through movement and material ===
Dansaekhwa is often characterized by a distinct attention to the three-dimensionality of works—even if they are on two-dimensional canvases. The physicality of Dansaekhwa is evident in the artistic process, such as Park Seo-Bo's continuous and repetitive movements to create flowing lines, and remnants of Lee Ufan's gestures captured on canvas. Lee has even described his movement in relation to performance. Some like Kwon Young-woo and Park Seo-Bo have asserted the necessity of creating work without a predetermined technique or concept in mind, underlining the role of action and deemphasizing intention. This emphasis on process is common for many Dansaekhwa artists, such as Chung Sang-Hwa who has called his artworks "processes."

A focus on physicality is also manifest in the artists' use of material. Dansaekhwa artists' rejection of the flat and solid picture plane has led to a range of experiments that manipulate material to ascribe these supposed flat surfaces new forms of objecthood. Kim Guiline's repeated layers of paint on mulberry added dimensionality to the surface. Chung Sang-Hwa scrapes dried paint, marks both the recto and verso of paintings, and utilizes the canvas surface as a fundamental part of the work by exposing or twisting it. Some artists intentionally tamper with the structural integrity of their material to reshape it. Ha Chong Hyun pushes paint through canvases, while Kwon Young-woo used his hands or tools to rip through paper.

=== Deceptive simplicity ===
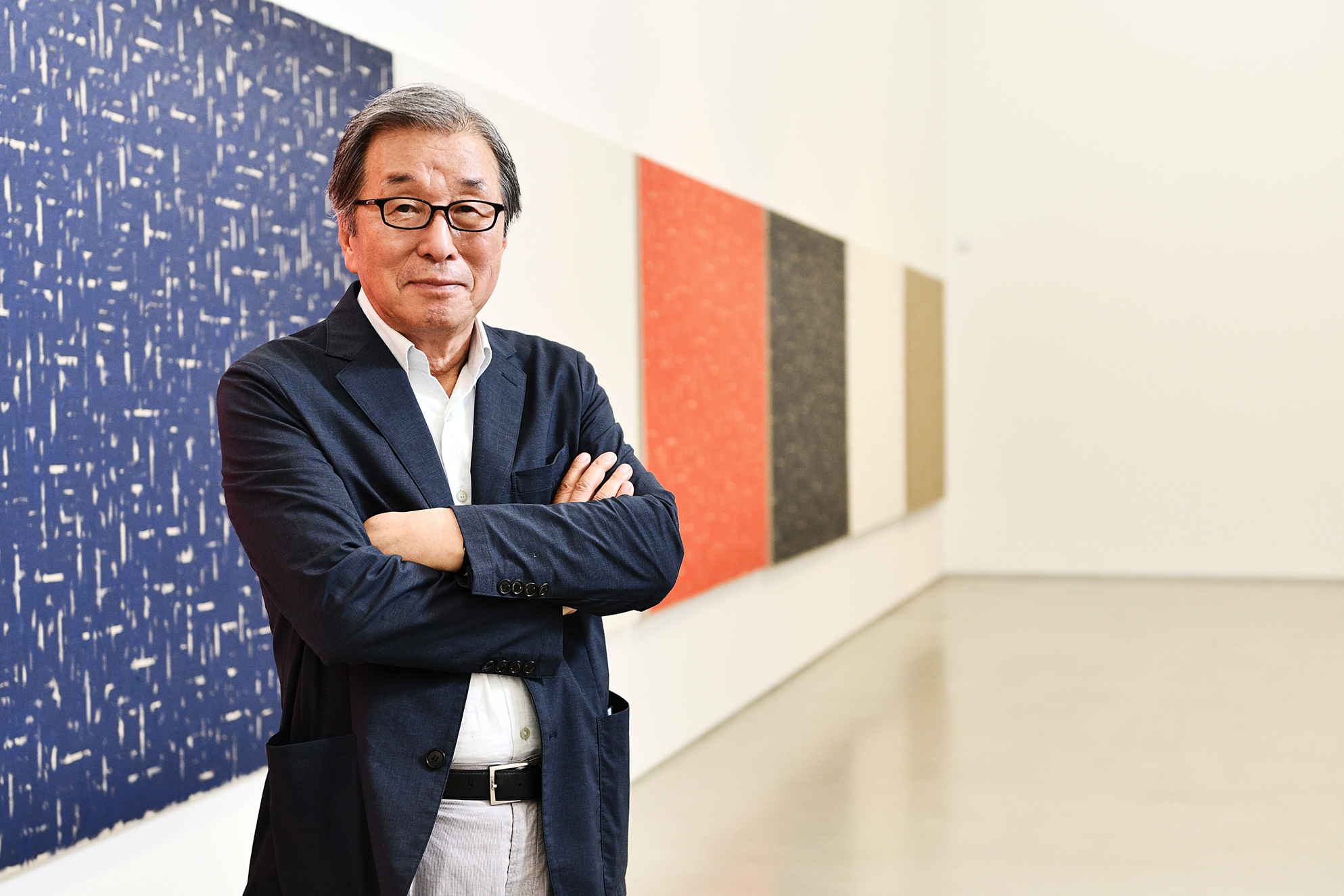
Choi Myoung Young standing in front of his work

While some of the works might appear simple or even effortless, the deliberateness of each and every mark requires close looking on the part of the viewer. For example, while Lee Ufan's brush strokes might appear uninvolved, his canvases contain pauses and strokes that are evidence of a carefully constructed composition. In writing about Yun Hyong-keun's work, Lee makes a similar observation about his fellow Dansaekhwa artist, emphasizing the need to recognize that while Yun's work might seem rustic and simple, they are the product of complex mental and physical processes. Yun's description of his process matched this statement, with Yun affirming that it can take him several days or even several months to complete a painting.

Both Suh Seung-Won and Choi Myoung Young state that the best word to describe their work is "monotony," emphasizing the role of repetition and uniformity of color, but argue that it is precisely the monotony of the work that opens up the possibility for rich expression and even change.

=== Destabilizing dichotomies ===
Dansaekhwa artists like Kwon Young-woo and Chung Chang-sup utilized traditional artistic materials like hanji and ink for their work on canvas, rejecting strict dichotomies between tradition and modernity. A few like Yun Hyong-keun worked with oil painting materials, but found alternative ways to wield them, such as placing the canvas on the ground, and restricting the color palette.

Many Dansaekhwa artists have reevaluated the relationship between figure and ground, emphasizing the role of the canvas as a part of the image in itself, resisting the use of sharp edges, and working both on and through surfaces.

== Critical reception ==
Dansaekhwa defied easy categorization for contemporary critics, falling somewhere between modern oil and traditional ink painting. The difficulty locating Dansaekhwa's origins—in relation to the local and global, and past and present—produced confused responses to the earliest shows of Dansaekhwa. Some simplified and arguably essentialist readings of Dansaekhwa focused on the use of the color white, inviting comparisons to Korean ceramics, and resonances with Zen Buddhism. Critic Lee Yil drew connections between contemporary abstract Korean artists and monochrome painters abroad (e.g. Yves Klein), but still distinguished the two, characterizing the former as viewing color as a psychological space, and the latter viewing color as a materialized space. Lee, as well as critic Lee Gu-yeol, utilized references to painters like Kazimir Malevich when writing about Dansaekhwa painters, but made a point to emphasize that the concept of the void had a much longer history in Asian aesthetics. Lee Yil even traced Malevich's ideas around Suprematism back to Asian philosophy.

Tokyo-based American art critic Joseph Love was unsure if the focus on process over outcome for avant-garde artists like Park Seo-Bo, Yun Hyong-keun, Kim Han, and Kim Whanki, several of whom became associated with Dansaekhwa and whose works were exhibited at the 1974 2nd Korean Indépendants Exhibition (National Museum of Contemporary Art, Gwacheon), might make it difficult for viewers to understand the value of these works. But he lauded how they maintained their strong sense of identity while defying artistic convention, and Love also identified the importance of texture in these pieces. Others like Bang Geun-taek and Oh Kwang-su honed in on the weaknesses they saw in Dansaekhwa, with the former dismissing it for its semiotic failures, and the latter claiming that the growing popularity of Dansaekhwa had transformed it into a shallow trend for contemporary artists to conform to.

As Dansaekhwa gained solid footing in contemporary art discourse, critics like Toshiaki Minemura have reaffirmed its superiority and thus longevity contra movements like Minjung art. But even writing on Dansaekhwa from the 90s onwards has had difficulty in determining its contours. For example, critic Lee Dong-Seok argued that visual and stylistic differences between Lee Ufan and Dansaekhwa made it difficult to group the former under the latter. Critics like Robert C. Morgan still had to clarify where Dansaekhwa stood in relation to artistic movements abroad, with Morgan arguing that even though Dansaekhwa artists were likely aware of minimalism in New York, their approach was fundamentally different. Others have sought to delineate the relationship between politics and Dansaekhwa. Reminiscent of the debates around Korean modern art in the 80s, Kwon Young-jin criticized Dansaekhwa for their silence and passivity in response to the Park regime, and role in stifling the rise of experimental art that could respond to the political realities of the time.

== Selected exhibitions ==
Starting in 2014, a spate of survey shows in Korea and the United States triggered renewed critical and commercial interest in Dansaekhwa. Some of these shows are listed below:

=== Group exhibitions ===
- "The Facet of Korean & Japanese Contemporary Art", Gwangju Museum of Art (29 March 2000-7 June 2000)
- "Dansaekhwa-Korean Monochrome Painting", National Museum of Modern and Contemporary Art, Korea (17 March-13 May 2012)
- "Dansaekhwa-Korean Monochrome Painting", Jeonbuk Museum of Art (1 June-15 July 2012)
- "Overcoming the Modern – Dansaekhwa: The Korean Monochrome Movement," Alexander Gray and Associates, New York (February 19 – March 29, 2014)
- “The Art of Dansaekhwa,” Kukje Gallery, Seoul (August 28 – October 19, 2014)
- “From All Sides: Tansaekhwa on Abstraction,” Blum & Poe, Los Angeles (September 13 – November 8, 2014)
- “Korean Abstract Painting,” Gallery Hyundai, Seoul (March 25 – April 22, 2015)
- “Dansaekhwa,” a collateral exhibition of the 56th Venice Biennale, Palazzo Contarini Polignac, Venice, Italy (May 8 – August 15, 2015)
- "Danseakhwa: L’aventure du monochrome en Corée, des années 70 à nos jours", Domaine de Kerguéhennec, Bignan, Brittany, France (March 5 – June 5, 2016)
- “Dansaekhwa & Minimalism,” Blum & Poe, Los Angeles (January–March 2016); Blum & Poe, New York (May–July 2016)

=== Solo exhibitions ===
- Yun Hyong-kuen, Palazzo Fortuny, Biennale Arte 2019, co-presented by National Museum of Modern and Contemporary Art, Seoul; the Civic Museums of Venice; Axel Vervoordt Gallery, David Zwirner, Simon Lee Gallery, Blum & Poe, and PKM Gallery
- Yun Hyong-keun, National Museum of Modern and Contemporary Art, Seoul (August 4 – February 6, 2018)
- Yun Hyong-keun, (first posthumous solo exhibition), PKM Gallery, Seoul (April 15 – May 17, 2015)
- Chung Sang-Hwa, Gallery Hyundai, Seoul (July 1 – 30, 2014)
- Park Seo-Bo, Galerie Perrotin in Paris (November 6 – December 20, 2014)
- Ha Chong Hyun (first US solo exhibition), Blum & Poe, New York (November 7 – December 20, 2014)
- Park Seobo (first US solo exhibition), Galerie Perrotin, New York (May 28 – July 3, 2015)
- Chung Chang-sup (first French solo exhibition), Galerie Perrotin, Paris (June 4 – August 1, 2015)
- Yun Hyong-keun (first posthumous solo exhibition in the US), Blum & Poe, New York (October 30 – December 23, 2015)
- Chung Chang-sup (first US solo exhibition), Galerie Perrotin, New York (November 3 – December 23, 2015)
- Ha Chong Hyun, Kukje Gallery, Seoul (September 17 – October 25, 2015)
- Lee Ufan, Pace London (September 15 – October 31, 2015)
- Kwon Young-woo, Kukje Gallery, Seoul (October 30 – December 6, 2015)
- Ha Chong Hyun, Tina Kim Gallery, New York (November 6 – December 12, 2015)
- Park Seo-Bo (first UK solo exhibition), White Cube, London (January, 2016)
- Kwon Young-woo (first US solo exhibition), Blum & Poe, New York (May, 2016)
- Cho Yong-ik, Sungkok Art Museum, Seoul (February 26 - April 24, 2016)
