= Choi Myoung Young =

South Korean painter (born 1941)

- Born: September 23, 1941 (age 84); Haeju, Kōkai-dō, Korea, Empire of Japan
- Known for: "Plane Conditions", Dansaekhwa-Korean monochrome paintings.
- Website: choimyoungyoung.com

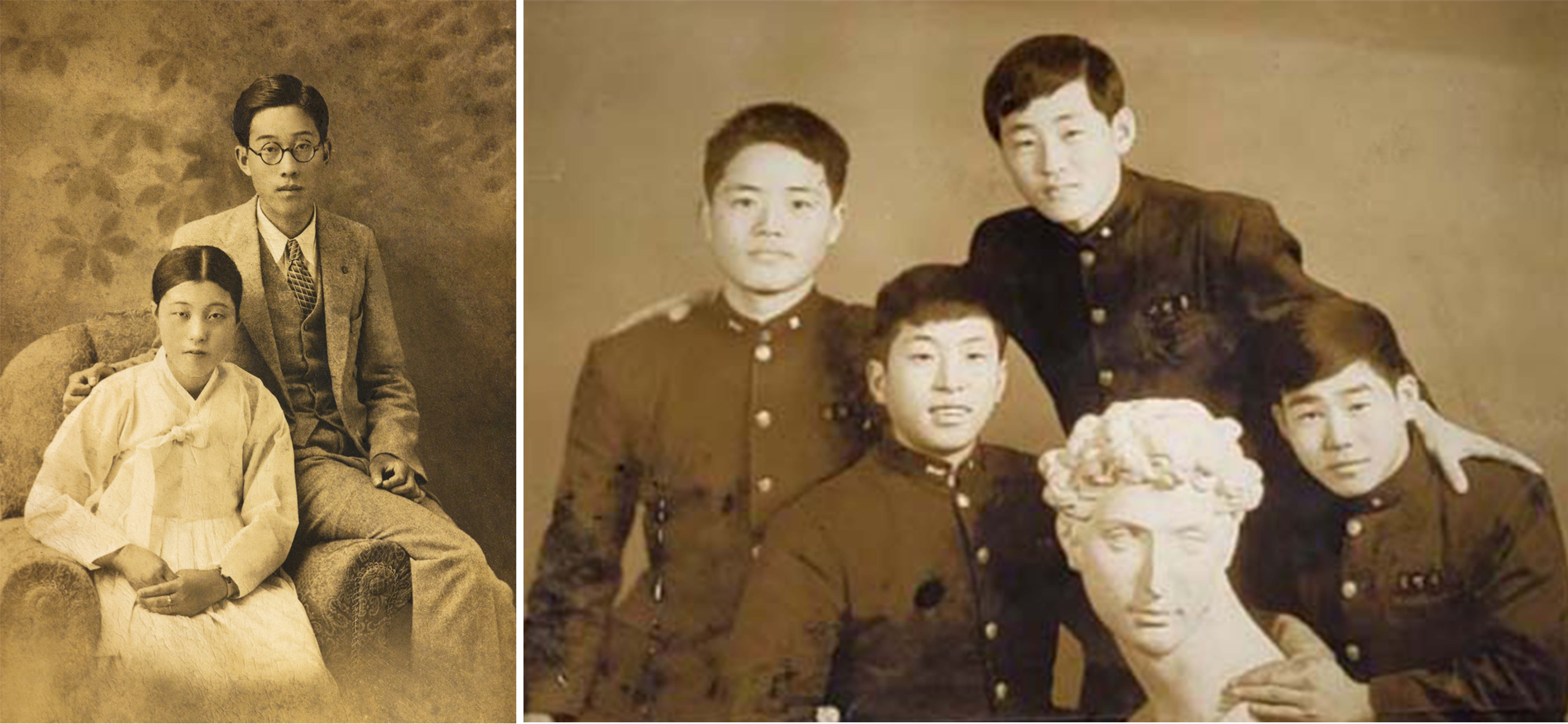
(left) A photo of his father Choi Jong-cheol and mother Jeon Byung-sook's engagement in 1935. (Right) A commemorative photo with friends in the art class of the Incheon National Sabeomhaggyo (Gyeongin National University of Education) in 1959.

Choi Myoung Young (Korean: 최명영; born September 23, 1941) is a South Korean painter. Throughout his career he has worked in the Dansaekhwa style of (monochrome painting).

== Early life and education ==
Choi was born in 1941 in Haeju, Kōkai-dō, Korea, Empire of Japan. He was educated at Hongik University.

== Career ==
After his studies at Hongik University, he became a member of two historical Korean art groups in the 1960s, "Origin" and "AG". During this time, he produced logically ordered works in a geometric/harmonic style, and began to consider the notion of "non-substantiality". His work became more experimental and minimal as he explored the nature of "non-painting" in his work. In 1968, he received an award of recognition from the 5th Korean Art Awards. He often uses a monochromatic palette, usually in white, yellow, black or blue. The paint is applied to the canvas using his fingers, brushes and rollers; while his drawings are made with an awl tool on paper. His work is considered meditative. During the 1970s he became associated with the Dansaekhwa movement of Korean monochrome painters. Culturally, Dansaekhwa represents a break with Korea's cultural past and embraces Western modernist movements.

Choi's work has been shown at the National Museum of Modern and Contemporary Art, Gwacheon, Taipei Municipal Museum, Taiwan, National Museum of Modern and Contemporary Art, Gwacheon, and SPSI Art Museum, Shanghai.

=== Work methods ===
Choi Myoung Young held his first solo exhibition at the Seoul Gallery in 1976. Since the mid-1970s, he has titled some of his works as "Conditional Plans". During this period, two formative ways of working emerged: the use of repetitively stamped fingerprints, and the use of "multi-layered colored bands painted in a monotone color on the canvas," or roller timing, which creates a non-illusionistic, flat homogeneous surface with layers of monochromatic strokes.

In addition to these repetitive mark-making tasks which imparts a physicality to the painting, it also uses the hanji paper to create "planar conditions." This is done by cutting a white hanji paper sheet into a long band which is dipped in ink and pasting horizontally. "We used white hanji instead of white paint. Cutting and pasting into bands is a variant of square division. By using Korean paper instead of paint, black sides by ink were needed. At the same time, the attempt to bring it together continues, eliminating the relationship between 'ground' and 'image'."

"In Choi Myoung Young's 'plane condition', the minimum unit is vertical and horizontal lines and planes. The artist superimposes numerous white brushes on a black background to erase the foundation, while on the other hand, stacking white. The black lines on the screen are the minimum margins left in the process of overlapping white color. Another minimum unit for 'plane conditions' is color. His main use of black and white is a neutral color that can embrace the essence of different colors and is the most ideal color for achieving the planarity that the artist seeks.”

Beginning in the mid-1990s to the present, the vertical and horizontal marks changed, allowing for more randomness, like a "disconnected spread of vertical and horizontal intersections", a non-continuous spread. Therefore, the vertical and horizontal lines becomes more subtle. "The vertical and horizontal the conditions of line, so to speak, form finite and infinite spatial conditions." His work has been described as having a, 'breathing' quality: "immersed in the endless breathing and physical movements" that can be perceived as a kind spirituality of Oriental calligraphy rather than as 'painting'."

Since the mid-1990s, Young's Conditional Planes series reveal a repetitive practice of 'offering the body,' referring to the 'performativity (修行性)' of spiritual practice through training of the mind in absolute happiness. In this sense, Choi Myoung Young painting is perceived as a Buddhist 'copie des livres sacrés bouddhiques (寫經)' process.

“The monochrome screen created by Choi Myoung Young's vertical and horizontal brushstrokes is a planarized layer that appeared through the process and is a performance that task of imparts physicality. If Chusa ('Chusache-Completed by Chusa Kim Jeonghui (1786–1856), a calligrapher of the Joseon Dynasty period)' is a world of poetry with various meanings on the plane, it is a non-image painting that forms a Sibang(time and space throughout the universe) layer in repetition and performance of Choi Myoung Young's work, and a philosophical act as an endless question. Although his painting is a logical process of contemporary art, his painting methods consist of primitive and essential asceticism."

The independent curator, Kim Yong-dae describes Young's work as a "simplified paradoxical process in which concepts and objects are endlessly overlapped, rather than divided into individual sounds, unlike the general writing system, and shows how to accommodate and capture only various situations without specific words. It is simple, short, and loosely connected, but quietly continues until it dispels some fear, as if incantation every day. In doing so, what is offered to us is his free way of thinking, questioning everything, how to think anew.”

It is the most Korean identity that transcends time and space. At the same time, its DNA is overlapping. Condensation and convergence through human physicality called 'fingerprints' in the digital media era is Choi Myoung Young 'Conditional Planes.' It is a point of deep intersection with the 'Ilhoeng (一橫)' of Chusa Kim Jeong-hui (秋史 金正喜, 1786–1856), a Korean calligrapher, epigraphists, scholar and painter who rose to fame in Korea's later Joseon period. Ilhoeng (一橫) is the quintessence of Chusa Kim Jung-hee's epigraphy calligraphy, which is said to encompass 309 monuments in a single width stroke." In this era, sign and symbols were included, the rhetoric of shapes and images increased, and flat paintings with a rich texture were carved respectively."

== Reception ==
The art critic, Byun Jong-pil writes in the essay, Choi Myoung Young, Exploring flatness for the spiritual return of material:

“Choi Myoung Young was an artist who realized the process of placing a plane in one space, excluding any narratives, and ultimately acquiring its existence as a plane that merges with the space. Above all, the practical force that immersed him in the flatness of painting for such a long time was the mental return of the material experienced in the process of integrating physicality and body with canvas, and the mental return is based on mutual harmony and moderation of planar conditions. After all, the proper relationship between the materials contained in the world of Choi Myoung Young's work will be in the authenticity of the work that our intelligence and the artist's intellect approach to the fundamental nature of the mutually understandable matter."

The article critic Shigeo Chiba describes Young's Conditional Planes series as:

"overcoming conventional painting on the ridge. While overcoming it, it is to walk the path of narrow possibility, the ridge. It is a 'painting' that is being attempted within a narrow horizon and a limited horizon of positivity. This is the original painting world of the vast horizon of Choi Myoung Young's 'Conditional Planes. We must not miss this point."

== Museum collections ==
Young's work is held in several permanent museum collections including the National Museum of Contemporary Art; Busan Museum of Art; Seoul Museum of Art; Gwangju Museum of Art; Daegu Art Museum; Daejeon Museum of Art; Walkerhill Art center; Leeum, Samsung Museum of Art; Hongik Museum of Art; Totalmuseum; Tokyo Metropolitan Art Museum; Mie Prefectural Art Museum; Shimonoseki City Art Museum.
