= Park Hyun-ki =

Korean video artist (1942–2000)

- Video Inclining Water, 1979, Video performance, Size variable
- Born: 1942; Osaka, Japan
- Died: January 13, 2000 (aged 57–58)

- Park Hyun-ki
- Hangul: 박현기
- Hanja: 朴炫基
- RR: Bak Hyeongi
- MR: Pak Hyŏn'gi

Park Hyun-ki (Korean: 박현기, 1942 – January 13, 2000) was a pioneer of Korean video art.

Although Park lacked technological training in video and initially felt dismayed that he could not create sophisticated effects, Park purposefully chose to make his work low tech; his video artworks often display still images or document performed actions, all the while eschewing complex editing. For Park, video was just one technological instance in the histories of innovation and of exploration of the relationship between reality and illusion. In particular, Park approached the medium of video art through an Eastern worldview, and he saw video as embodying the spiritual aspects of both advanced technology and materialism.Across many of his works, Park perturbed the boundaries between the real and the virtual, to the extent that he revealed how virtual images were informed by the real, and how the virtual and the real could become interconnected spaces within the context of his artworks. According to the scholar Jung E. Choi, Park aimed to reconcile what TV/video signified as a medium (i.e., "technology, illusion, and materiality") and what it could convey (i.e., "nature, perception, and materiality").

Park is best known for his video artworks, yet performance, installation, and photography also marked major veins of his artistic practice. The curator Kim Inhye has observed that—from bringing rocks into a gallery and running nude amidst them to stacking bricks, cutting railroad ties, and erecting planks—Park pursued an array of artistic mediums in highly experimental ways. Nonetheless, as Kim has argued, Park dedicated the breadth of his practice to creating artworks that not only embodied Korean tradition, but also activated the ability of Korean tradition to relate to the human condition and to people from all over the world.

As the art historian Yeon Shim Chung has observed, posthumous retrospective exhibitions on Park Hyun-ki (namely, Park Hyunki: Presence and Reflection in 2008 at the Daegu Arts and Culture Center and Hyun_ki at Gallery Hyundai in 2010) have propelled a fresh wave of recent research on Park's practice. To date, the largest scale of these recent exhibitions was presented in 2015 by the National Museum of Modern and Contemporary Art, Korea; the exhibition included over 1000 artworks and archival ephemera on Park Hyun-ki.

== Biography ==
During the Japanese colonial era, Park's father was drafted and relocated to Japan. Park was born in 1942 in Osaka, Japan to an impoverished family. In 1945, his family relocated to Daegu in US–occupied Korea, with the end of World War II. Park enrolled in Hongik University in 1961; he began his studies as a painting major, but he switched to the architecture department in his third year. His decision to change paths was in part to support himself financially, yet it was also compelled by his exposure to an image of an outdoor performance work of Hans Hollein sitting in a clear vinyl house erected on a grassy field; in seeing this work, Park decided that painting was no longer superior to architecture. Park graduated from Honk University in 1967 and returned to Daegu in 1968.

Back in Daegu, Park sought respite from the uptake of Western art historical canons and consumerism that he experienced during his studies in Seoul. He pursued pastimes such as collecting antiques and traveling to remote areas to collect Suseok. He sought understanding of Korean culture by visiting temples, museums, and rural families (notably by visiting the ancient Silla capital of Gyeongju).

While living in Daegu, Park worked at an interior design firm called Cubic Design, from which he made enough to finance his artistic practice.

In 1974, Park first was compelled to experiment with video after seeing a screening of Nam June Paik's Global Groove at the United States Information Service in Daegu. Having read in Art in America about Paik's arrest following a 1967 performance in New York, Park was, according to the media theorist and historian Yi Wonkon, "awestruck by the idea that TV, which he had always thought of as an 'idiot box,' can be the most avant-garde artistic tool." After seeing Paik's work, Park visited a broadcasting studio in Daegu in order to observe its television equipment. Beginning in 1978, he gained initial access to video technology and created his first video artworks in Daegu (at K Studio, a commercial studio that belonged to the photographer Kwon Joongin) and in Japan (through the Japanese video artist Katsuhiro Yamaguchi). Although Park initially felt discouraged that his lack of technological knowledge prohibited him from achieving the sophistication of Paik's use of television technology, he later took confidence in pursuing video in a decisively low-tech way.

Though based in Daegu for the entirety of his artistic career, Park participated in international art exhibitions like Sao Paulo Biennial (1979) and the Biennale de Paris (1980), as well as in number of exhibitions in Japan in the 1980s. In the 1990s, Park participated alongside younger generation Korean media artists in several exhibitions that explored the theme of Art and Technology, notably the 1993 Daejeon Expo and the Info Art section of the Gwangju Biennale in 1995.

In 1997, Park Hyun-ki's interior design firm went bankrupt amidst the IMF crisis. After being diagnosed with stomach cancer, Park died on January 13, 2000. Not a single work was sold during his lifetime, but he left behind his massive collection of over 20,000 artworks and items that were donated to the National Museum of Modern and Contemporary Art, Korea.

== Notable artworks ==
=== Early experiments and the Daegu Contemporary Art Festival ===
Beginning in the mid-1970s, Park Hyunki joined the artists Lee Kang-so, Hwang Hyeonuk, Choi Byung-so, Kim Youngjin, and others, to play a leading role in establishing the Daegu Contemporary Art Festival. Described by curator Kim Chandong and one of the "most experimental activities" in postwar Korean art that presented an array of performances, installations, process art, and video art, the Daegu Contemporary Art Festival was held five times between 1974 and 1979.

For the 1975 Daegu Contemporary Art Festival, Park presented a work from his Drown series, made from spattering paint on a trowel so as to stencil the trowel's form upon the canvas, then affixing the trowel to the canvas. According to the media theorist and historian Yi Won-kon, this work underscored the relationship between an object and its image.

For the 1977 Festival, Park contributed the work Event, which was staged as part of the Nakdong Riverside Pavilion on May 1, 1977. For Event, Park scattered lime powder in the opposite direction of the shadows cast by poplar trees, so as to create the mirror image of the trees' dark shadow. An ephemeral artwork, it possessed the "sense of life that can easily be wiped off by wind, rain, and people's footsteps," which situated the work as unlike a long-lasting image.

During the late 1970s, Park Hyunki and the artists Lee Kang-so, Kim Young-jin, and Choi Byung-so gained access to video equipment at K Studio in Daegu. The results of their experiments were shown at two of the Daegu Contemporary Art Festivals. In 1978, Park experimented with video recording the light reflected upon the surface of water in a film developing tray at K Studio. The twenty-five minute video shows the light playing upon the water's surface as it was perturbed by a hand and then left to resettle. Together, the four artists showed their experiments in a section titled Video and Film of the 4th Daegu Contemporary Arts Festival, which took place September 24–30, 1978.

In 1978, Park traveled to Japan to study video making techniques. Gaining access to the use video technology through the help of the Japanese video artist Katsuhiro Yamaguchi, he produced works such as TV Fishbowl, for which he placed a monitor showing footage of fish underwater upon a stool. Park presented TV Fishbowl in the 5th Daegu Contemporary Arts Festival in 1979. At the same festival, Park presented a video work that recorded a mirror erected upon Nakdong River. In this work, the water appeared to flow into its own image, reflected in the mirror that was situated perpendicular to the water's surface.

The media theorist Yi Wonkon has observed that Park's video works presented in the 1978 and 1979 Daegu Contemporary Art Festivals used water and video to question binaries such as real/virtual and natural/technological—an interrogative methodology that Park would continue to pursue throughout his career.

=== Untitled (TV Stone Pagoda) series ===
Park's series Untitled (TV Stone Pagoda) are among the works for which he is best known. In these works, Park stacked one or more television monitors that displayed an image of a stone, within a tower of natural stones. Juxtaposing natural materials (stones) with an object of contemporary civilization (a TV monitor), each TV Stone Pagoda, as Yi Won-kon has observed, probes perception as it examines the relationship between material reality and immaterial virtuality. Yi has interpreted the series as bringing together material reality and virtual reality, so that the two become "a continuation of each other." Similarly, Jung E. Choi sees the series as at once harmonizing and opening questions about the relationship between the real and the virtual, the material and immaterial.

Although some have interpreted Park's TV Pagoda series as inspired by or in dialogue with the Japanese art movement Mono-ha, Yi Won-kon has argued that, based on Park Hyun-ki's writings and interviews with his family, the series instead stems from Park's personal experience, background in architecture, and interest in tradition and spirituality in Korea. In particular, Park's choice of stones for this series is evocative of his own experience of evacuation during the Korean War; as he moved with a procession of people, each member picked up a small stone, then placed it carefully atop a pile of stones when they passed it. The mass of stones left Park awestruck as he witnessed people take the time to pick up a stone, place it, and contemplate their hopes and wishes for the future. To Park, the stones appeared to construct a tomb-like efficacious site. Drawing upon this memory, Park chose stones for his TV Stone Pagoda series (as well as myriad other installation works) for the stones' ability to embody memory, desire, and civilization.

At a solo exhibition in Seoul (the exact date is disputed, but was sometime between 1978 and early 1979), Park presented a TV Stone Pagoda for the first time. After seeing this exhibition, the critic Oh Gwangsu recommended Park for the Sao Paulo Biennial, for which Park contributed another TV Pagoda.

Untitled (TV Stone Pagoda) won the Grand Prize at Korea Art Exhibition held at Deoksugung National Museum of Art in 1980. In 1980, Park Hyunki participated in the Biennale de Paris with another TV Stone Pagoda work, which was presented among the first section of video artworks in the exhibition's history. From these initial works, Park continued to incorporate televisions—alongside stones—within his sculptural and installation works of the 1980s and 1990s.

Subsequent iterations of Untitled (TV Stone Pagoda) were exhibited in Korea as part of Media as Translator Performance (a one-day outdoor performance) in Daegu (1982) and at Yoon Gallery (1984) and Soo Gallery(1985). Other works from the series were made for exhibitions abroad such as Korea Contemporary Art in five cities across Japan (1983), and at the Taipei Fine Art Museum (1984) and Art Chicago (1998).

=== Performances ===
Within Park's artistic practice, performance constituted not an isolated genre, but instead intersected with his incorporations of natural materials/objects, such as stones or water, and documentation, via video or photography. Two early examples of Park's performances are Video Inclining Water and Pass Through the City.

While experimenting with video equipment during his 1978 trip to Japan, Park recorded the first version of his Video Inclining Water performance. Documentation of the performance shows Park tilting the video monitor in coordination to the video image of water that is being played, to give an illusion as if his movements coordinate the changing directions of the water level. For the 1979 Sao Paulo Biennial, Park re-staged and re-recorded Video Inclining Water in Sao Paulo, and exhibited ten photographs to document the performance.

For the 1981 performance Pass Through the City, Park fabricated a replica of a stone quarried from Seoul, then drove it through Daegu on top of a truck. On a section of the stone Park had mounted a mirror, which reflected the cityscape passing by; he also situated a video camera on the truck's roof opposite the stone, to record the mirror's reflection. As Yi Wonkon has observed, Passing Through the City is a meditation upon the stone as embodying reflections of civilization and time.

=== Late work ===
In the mid to late 1990s, Park shifted away from using television monitors and toward beam projectors, which enabled him to create more expansive video installations—a technological transition many Korean media artists made during these years. However, Park's works with video projections were limited, in part due to his early death in the year 2000.

For the InfoArt section of the 1995 Gwangju Biennale, Park employed projected video for his work The Blue Dining Table. In this work, recordings of recent disasters, such as the Kobe earthquake and the collapse of the Sampoong Department Store (both in 1995), were projected onto plaster casts of the artist's body parts, placed on various dish ware, evoking how the outcries of these disasters have permeated Park's own body.

Produced between 1996 and 1997, Park's Mandala series interwove myriad clips from pornography with erotic Buddhist and Hindu images and often projected the content from the ceiling onto a dish or vessel. The works transgresses the boundaries between the secular and the sacred to create, in Yi Won-kon's words, "a chaos of life and desire," and, in Jung E. Choi's, a "state of transcendence."

After Park's death, a work from the Presence and Reflection series was first presented at the grand opening of the independent space Art Center Nabi on January 1, 2000. His final work, Individual Code, was realized according to its description in his will and presented at the third Gwangju Biennale. The work consisted of a video of a series of fingerprints with a resident registration number overlaid, appearing and disappearing; in effect, it juxtaposed a symbol of born, corporeal identity with that of the national system of identification.
