= Tina Kim =

Tina Kim may refer to:

- Tina Kim (comedian), Korean-American stand-up comedian
- Tina Kim (art dealer), art dealer and gallery owner
  - Tina Kim Gallery
