= U-ram Choe =

South Korean artist

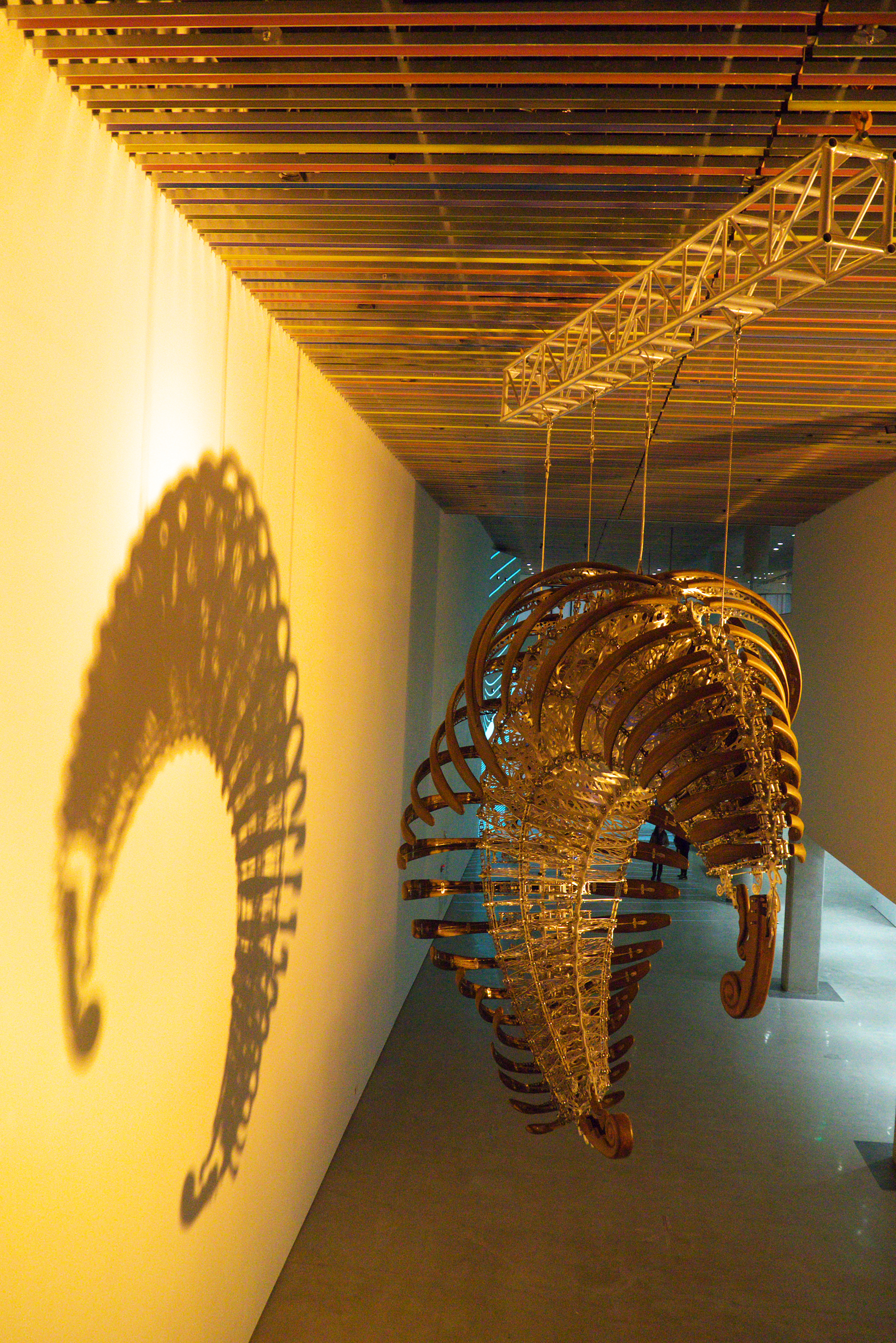
- Opertus Lunula Umbra (Hidden Shadow of the Moon), National Museum of Modern and Contemporary Art opening, Seoul, 2013
- Born: 1970 (age 55–56); Seoul, South Korea
- Education: Chungang University
- Known for: Kinetic Sculpture
- Awards: Kim Sechoong Sculpture Award, POSCO Steel Art Award

- U-ram Choe
- Hangul: 최우람
- RR: Choe Uram
- MR: Ch'oe Uram

U-Ram Choe (born 1970) is an artist based in Seoul, South Korea.

Integrating both mechanical and computerized movements within his sculptures ever since the late 1990s, Choe's works push the genre of moving kinetic art toward its newer-generation iterations, such as robotic art. His sculptures' skeletal systems often expose the mechanisms of its movement by laying bare its machine of motors, gears, and drives, while minimally relying upon a CPU to direct their system. Many of these mechanical elements—bolts, nuts, bearings—are all custom-made; at the same time, the external materials are often hand-crafted with special finishes.

Often referred to as a sculptor who creates mechanical life, Choe models the movement of many of his works after living creatures, but also fantastically combines elements of different lifeforms. Though the focus of Choe's practice has shifted from animal life to human society in recent years, across the arc of his practice the machine has served as a both reflection of human desire and an extension of humankind.

== Biography ==
Choe was born in Seoul, South Korea. His parents were artists. His grandfather was a car engineer who worked on the first car developed in Korea. From a young age, Choe was fascinated with machines and science. Growing up during the Cold War and also watching many science fiction television programs, Choe aspired as a child to build robots that could protect his family. However, he ultimately followed his parents' wishes by attending art school.

Choe attended Chung-ang University in Seoul, where he earned B.F.A. in 1992 and M.F.A. in 1999. In his third year of undergraduate studies, a course taught by the artist Geum Nuri introduced him to kinetic sculpture. Also during his studies at Chung-ang, Choe began to experiment with integrating motorized elements in his sculptures. After graduating, Choe gained work experience in robotics at a commercial company named Microrobot.

== Notable Artworks ==
=== Self Portrait (1977) ===
At the age of seven, Choe created a self portrait with the help of his father; it showed a pair of robots, one of an anthropomorphic form and the other shaped like a fish. Rendered in oil and charcoal, the robots do not have external features; instead their forms' outlines encase systems of machine-like parts. In 2012, Choe revisited this work by creating a sculptural version. It featured a robot form with similarly outstretched arms, surrounded by an array of tools and planning drawings.

=== "Anima-machine" works (c. 2002–present) ===
After an exploratory period creating various sculptures with robotic elements during the late 1990s, in the early 2000s Choe began to apply robotic movement and engineering to fantastical, animal-like forms. Termed "anima-machines," these moving sculptures pursue the relationship between—and coexistence of—nature and machines. Most have Latin-esque titles, reminiscent of binomial nomenclature, the scientific naming of animals, and many were accompanied by allegorical narratives when the sculptures were exhibited.

One example of Choe's anima-machine works is Custos Cavum (2011). First inspired by a documentary on antarctic seals who use their front teeth to gnaw through underwater ice, the work's moving ribs meticulously mimic the breathing movements of mammals. When exhibited, Custos Cavum was accompanied by a mythical narrative; it describes a guardian creature who gnawed holes between two worlds to keep them connected, until it went extinct.

=== Recent works (2012–present) ===
Beginning in 2012, Choe turned his focus from pursuing new levels of technical sophistication to social context as he broadened his scope beyond depicting animal-machines to examining power dynamics in contemporary society. Choe's Ouroboros (2012) was among the sculptures that marked this shift. A snake-like sculpture of a creature eating its own tail, the work alludes to the insatiability of human greed.

Among these recent works, URC-1 (2014) considers machinery's cyclical existence in society, from being produce to discarded, and later to being repurposed. The work amasses over 150 junked car headlights into a spherical, glowing nest. Collected from Hyundai Motors' junkyard, the headlights appear resurrected in Choe's sculpture.

Another example is Pink Hysteria (2018), in which a group of pink flowers stand as a metonymy for collective society. Inspired by Choe’s reflections on North vs. South Korea societies amidst the 2018 Olympics, the work encases group of flowers within four glass walls, which constrains their wave-like movements. In 2022, Choe developed a new body of over 49 works for a solo exhibition at the National Museum of Modern and Contemporary Art, Korea; together, these works probe questions of human destiny. Bearing the exhibition's title, the work Little Ark opened questions where humanity is headed while using recycled and repurposed consumer cardboard for its oars. Works such as One and Red were made of Tyvek—the fibrous material that makes up hazmat suits, notably worn by medical workers during the pandemic, that also looks like Hanji.

== Exhibitions ==
Following his first solo exhibition in 1998, Choe became the first Korean artist to hold a solo exhibition at Tokyo's Mori Art Museum in 2006. He participated in global biennials such as the 2nd Gwangju Biennale, the 2008 Liverpool Biennial at FACT, Foundation for Art and Creative Technology, Liverpool, Asian Art Triennial and the Shanghai Biennial. His works have been presented at institutions such as Leeum, Samsung Museum of Art; the Asia Society Museum; Seoul Museum of Art; and the Busan Museum of Art. Choe has received the POSCO Steel Art Award Grand Prize and Today's Young Artist Award for Fine Arts Sector in 2006, the Kim Se-Choong Sculpture Award for Young Artist in 2009 and was a Signature Art Prize Finalist in 2014. In 2022, he was selected to present the ninth MMCA Hyundai Motor Series exhibition at the National Museum of Modern and Contemporary Art, Korea.
