= Choi Byung-so =

South Korean artist (1943–2025)

- Born: 1943; South Korea
- Died: September 11, 2025 (aged 81–82)
- Education: Chung-Ang University (BFA); Keimyung University (MFA)
- Known for: Painting, Drawing, Mixed media
- Movement: Dansaekhwa, Korean Experimental Art

Choi Byung-so (Korean: 최병소; 1943 – September 11, 2025) was a South Korean contemporary artist. He was primarily associated with the Korean experimental art movement and the Dansaekhwa (Korean monochrome painting) movement of the 1970s. He is known for his process-based works in which he repeatedly covered printed newspapers with ballpoint pen and pencil until the text was completely obliterated.

== Biography ==
Choi was born in South Korea, in 1943. He graduated with a Bachelor of Fine Arts from Chung-Ang University in 1974 and received a Master of Fine Arts from Keimyung University in 1985. In the 1970s, he was a founding member of the Daegu Contemporary Art Festival (1974–1978), which played a significant role in the early development of experimental art in South Korea. He continued his artistic practice, exploring materiality and existence, until his death on September 11, 2025.

== Work ==
Choi's primary artistic method involved taking printed materials, such as newspapers and magazines, and repeatedly drawing lines over them using black ballpoint pens and graphite pencils. Through this continuous, repetitive physical action, the original printed information was erased, and the accumulation of graphite and ink transformed the delicate paper into a solid, metallic-like surface.

Art historians and critics have placed his practice within the contexts of conceptual art and Dansaekhwa. Art publications have described his repetitive erasure of text as an avant-garde practice and an ontological performance that deconstructs existing systems of meaning and reduces the material to its fundamental physical properties. Major South Korean mainstream media have also highlighted that his process of systematically obliterating newspaper articles served as a subtle form of artistic resistance during the military dictatorship in the 1970s.

== Selected exhibitions ==
=== Solo exhibitions ===
- 2026: Untitled, Perrotin, Seoul, South Korea
- 2025: Untitled, Wooson Gallery, Seoul, South Korea
- 2024: Now here, Indang Museum, Daegu Health College, Daegu, South Korea
- 2022: Choi Byung-so, Wooson Gallery, Daegu, South Korea
- 2020: Meaning and Meaninglessness, Arario Gallery, Seoul, South Korea
- 2016: Musée d'art moderne et contemporain (MAMC), Saint-Étienne, France
- 2016: Galerie Maria Lund, Paris, France
- 2015: Derivation, Wooson Gallery, Daegu, South Korea
- 2012: Daegu Art Museum, Daegu, South Korea
- 2005: Gallery IBU, Paris, France
- 1979: Muramatsu Gallery, Tokyo, Japan

=== Group exhibitions ===
- 2024: Only the Young: Experimental Art in Korea, 1960s–1970s, Hammer Museum, Los Angeles, USA
- 2023: Only the Young: Experimental Art in Korea, 1960s–1970s, Solomon R. Guggenheim Museum, New York, USA / National Museum of Modern and Contemporary Art (MMCA), Seoul, South Korea
- 2016: The Moon, Full and Broken, National Museum of Modern and Contemporary Art (MMCA), Gwacheon, South Korea
- 2016: Dansaekhwa, Domaine de Kerguéhennec, Bignan, France
- 2012: Korean Dansaekhwa, National Museum of Modern and Contemporary Art (MMCA), Seoul, South Korea
- 1997: FIAC, Sigong Gallery, Paris, France
- 1996: Korean Drawing Now, Brooklyn Museum, New York, USA
- 1979: 15th São Paulo Biennial, São Paulo, Brazil
- 1977: Aspect of Korean Contemporary Art, National Museum of History, Taipei, Taiwan
- 1974–1978: Daegu Contemporary Art Festival, Daegu, South Korea

== Public collections ==
Choi's works are held in the public collections of several institutions, including:

- National Museum of Modern and Contemporary Art (MMCA), South Korea
- Seoul Museum of Art, South Korea
- Daegu Art Museum, South Korea
- Busan Museum of Art, South Korea
- Daejeon Museum of Art, South Korea
- Eastern Michigan University, United States
