= Chung Chang-sup =

South Korean painter (1927–2011)

Chung Chang-sup (Korean: 정창섭; 1927 – 2011) was a Korean abstract painter and an early member of the post‑war art movement Dansaekhwa (Monochrome Painting). Early in his career, he worked primarily with oil paint, but he later explored Korean materials such as hanji (Korean mulberry paper) and ink. Because of his close connections to government elites, he found success as an oil painter in the state‑sponsored National Painting Project. His lifelong explorations with hanji pulp, called tak, are more well-known and became his trademark. Chung's unique approach to Korean materials was inspired by Eastern philosophies regarding harmony and nature. As one of the leading innovators of Dansaekwa, Chung's works were, and continue to be exhibited internationally in group and solo shows.

== Biography ==
Chung was born in 1927 in Cheongju, North Chungcheong Province, South Korea. He graduated from the Department of Painting at Seoul National University in 1951. He entered the art world with his work Sunset in 1953 at the 2nd Korean Art Exhibition. From 1956 to 1961, he was an art teacher at Seoul Arts High School. In 1961, he was the recommended artist for the 10th National Art Exhibition. From 1957 to 1962, he served on the committee of judges for the Contemporary Art Exhibition. Overlapping that period, from 1965 to 1964 Chung worked on a mural painting for the Seoul National University. In 1965, he also served as a judge for the 1st Korean Art Exhibition. In 1967, he became the Director of the Korean Fine Arts Association. In 1968, he was an advisor for the São Paulo International Exhibition and also finished a mural for the Jeoldusan Catholic Cathedral. In 1969, he was a recommended artist for the 18th Korean National Art Exhibition. In 1970, he finished another mural in Hyeongchungsa and served on a committee of judges for the 19th Korean Art Exhibition. From 1972 to 1988 he was a judge for 16 more Korea-based exhibitions. He became a professor at the Seoul National University College of fine Arts in 1961 and he retired in 1993. He had his first solo exhibition in 1984. From 1992 to 1997 he served as a committee member and judge of the Korean Art competition. From his retirement to 2010 he was an Honorary Professor of Seoul National University.

Chung died in 2011.

== Work ==
Chung's university training made him familiar with Western modernism, and this influence can be seen in his oil paintings, which formalistically emulate Cubism and Art Informel. After graduating from Seoul National University, he made his debut at the 2nd Korean Art Exhibition in 1953. His piece, Sunset, was an oil painting that featured thickly applied paint and bold colors. His early work conveys the tragedy of war following Japanese Occupation/World War II and also his place in the world. In 1955 a painting, Workshop, painted in an academic style featured a scene from his artist studio to highlight his social status as a professional painter. Workshop won a special prize in the 4th National Art Exhibition. His 1958 work, Interrogation, shows the scars of war through the cracked surface of the paint and dark, reddish hues. Like other Dansaekwa painters, Chung was also well-informed about American Abstract Expressionism, Art Informel, and Color Field Painting. His oil paintings more closely resemble the style of Art Informel due to their textured, rough application of paint and the gestural marks that evoke the lines of a sketch drawing. In the late 1960s Chung created his Circle Series and Sympathy Series, which featured shapes and represented the idea of spiritual balance. He was still using oil paints at this time and a vibrant color palette which included blue, yellow, and red. These colors were referencing traditional Korean folk colors and the circular shapes represented the shape of Buddha's halo.

During the late 1960s and mid-1970s, Chung participated in a state-sponsored artistic initiative known as Minjok Girokhwa (“National Record Painting”), which aimed to depict Korea's historical events, cultural identity, and modernization efforts through large-scale realist compositions. These works were commissioned under the authoritarian regime of President Park Chung Hee. Chung's painting Battle of Mount Taebaek (Taebaeksan Jeontu, 1975) portrays an armed conflict between Korean civilian resistance fighters and Japanese forces in the aftermath of the 1905 Japan–Korea Treaty. Another work from the same year, Incheon Port Dock (1975), reflects the Park administration's emphasis on modernizing infrastructure in port cities to facilitate international trade.

In the 1970s he created his Return Series paintings which expanded his exploration of infinity, emptiness, and Korean materials. This series was characterized by black ink splotches or bleeds that brought attention to the edges of hanji paper. He studied the techniques and materials of ink painting and applied it to his approach to abstraction. For example, he would use ink to make abstract marks on hanji. The placement of these marking would be atypical such as in Return (1979) where ink is only sparsely dotted along the outer rim of the paper. Chung and his other contemporaries, such as Lee Ufan, created a minimalist and meditative aesthetic in their pieces which were inspired by the demure white porcelain forms made during the Joseon Era (1932–1910) and inspired by Confucian ideals. This connection is most pronounced in Chung's titles such as “White Porcelain.” The “meditative” aspects of his work were also attributed to his monochromatic palettes that usually featured white, black, and beige.

In 1980s, Chung's Tak Series (named after the name of mulberry tree used to make hanji) solidified his trademark use and manipulation of hanji and wet tak paper on canvas. Tak was a paper material used in architecture such as for screen doors and windows. Chung had a childhood encounter with sunlight shining through a tak paper window which later inspired him to highlight the permeable nature of tak on a physical and conceptual level.

In the 1990s his dedication to tak was furthered in his Meditation Series. After spreading the wet pulp on canvas, he would impress shapes and lines onto the surface to create a smooth areas amidst the bumpy mixture. Sometimes he would color the pulp with natural pigments such as tobacco leaves and charcoal to achieve a darker hue. The effect was more controlled than his earlier Tak Series, and evoked an “opening” that meditation can bring to one's chaotic mind. The impressions of the quadrilateral shapes highlight the rough edges and limits of the canvas plane. The rough edges allude to the tenuous bordes between all substances in reality that are transcended during meditation. His process is controlled and yet there is always an element of happenstance and chance since the pulp settles and dries on the canvas in unique ways. In the artist's words the works are, “paintings that hanji paints by itself.”

Korean art critic Yoon Jin-sup remarks that Chung's, “creations are placed within an ecological, cosmological, and terrestrial perspective which is diametrically opposed to the formalist vision of Westerners.” Critic Lee Yil described Dansaekhwa artists to work in a, “post-minimal abstraction that is both post-formalist and post-materialist.” While that may be the critics’ takes, formal elements of Chung's work were certainly guided by Eastern philosophy such as Dao (The Way) and Western elements of minimalist abstraction.

=== National Documentary Paintings Project ===
Chung was the childhood friend of Kim Jong-pil, Park Chung-hee's right-hand man and chair of the Democratic Republican Party. In 1966, the National Documentary Paintings Production Office was created to commission paintings depicting famous historical moments. With generous state-backed funds, artists such as Chung Chang-sup were hired and their works were bought by the state. Chung was well connected to the Yushin elite.

== Awards ==
Chung received numerous awards including The 2nd Korean National Art Exhibition Special Prize (1953 and 1955), Bronze Prize at The 1st Saigon International Biennale (1962), 13th Joong Ang Cultural Grand Prize (1987) and the Order of Korean National Art Merit (1993).

== Exhibitions ==
Chung had had major solo exhibitions at LA Art Core Center (1984), Ueda Gallery (1985), Tokyo Gallery (1994), Mark Moore Galery (1995), Hyundai Gallery (1996), and a major retrospective at the Korean National Museum of Modern and Contemporary Art (2010).

He also participated in several group exhibitions including the 2nd Paris Youth Biennale (1961), São Paulo Art Biennial (1965), Modernism in Korean Contemporary Art Scene: 1970- 1979 at the Hyundai Department Store Gallery (1988), Working with Nature: Traditional Thought in Contemporary Art from Korea at Tate Liverpool (1992), Age of Philosophy and Aesthetics at the National Museum of Contemporary Art (2002), Monochrome Painting of Korea, Past and Present at the Seoul Museum of Art (2004), Masters of Korean Contemporary Art at Leehwaik Gallery (2006), Dansaekhwa: Korean Monochrome Painting at the Korean National Museum of Contemporary Art (2012), and the 12th Sharjah Biennial (2015), When Process Becomes Form: Dansaekhwa and Korean Abstraction at the Boghossian Foundation.

== Public collections ==
Museum of Modern Art, New York, M+ Museum, Hong Kong, National Museum of Contemporary Art, Gwacheon; Seoul Museum of Art, Seoul; Busan Museum of Modern Art, Busan; Daejeon Museum of Art, Daejeon; Samsung Museum of Art, Seoul; Walkerhill Art Center, Seoul; Sonje Museum of Contemporary Art, Gyeongju; Youngeun Museum, Gwangju; HanLim Museum, Daejeon; Seoul National University Museum, Seoul; Korea University Museum, Seoul; Ewha Womans University Museum, Seoul; 63 Museum, Seoul; Royal Nepal Museum, Nepal; Tokyo Metropolitan Art Museum, Tokyo; Mie Prefectural Art Museum, Mie, Japan; Shimonoseki City Art Museum, Shimonoseki; Hiroshima City Museum of Contemporary Art, Hiroshima, Japan.
