= Yun Hyong-keun =

Korean artist

- 윤형근
- Born: April 12, 1928; Cheongwon-gun, North Chungcheong Province, Korea
- Died: December 28, 2007 (aged 79)
- Education: Hongik University
- Occupation: Painter
- Website: https://www.yunhyongkeun.org

Yun Hyong-keun (Korean: 윤형근, 12 April 1928 – 28 December 2007) was a South Korean artist. After graduating from the Hongik University, Yun became associated with the Dansaekhwa movement. Yun is well known for the smearing effects of burnt umber and ultramarine blue paints on raw canvas or linen, which reveals a Korean sensibility of reflection and meditation.

== Early life ==
Yun Hyong-keun was born in Cheongwon-gun (present day Cheongju), North Chungcheong Province, near the city of Daejeon in the central-western part of what is today the Republic of Korea. Even at the height of Japanese colonial rule, Yun had the chance to receive art instruction under direction of Oh Dong-myeong and Ahn Seung-gak at Cheongju Commercial School, from which he graduated in 1945.

Influenced by Ahn, Yun enrolled in a short-term course at Cheongju Teachers' College to study drawing for half a year in 1946. Subsequently, in the following year, although his family was against his studying art, Yun attended the College of Fine Arts at the newly founded Seoul National University. It was at the university that Yun and Kim Whanki, who was the professor supervising the university's entrance exam, first met. From then on, Yun began his art career under the tutelage of Kim, who even became Yun's father-in-law in 1960.

However, shortly after entering SNU, Yun's period of hardship began. In 1948 and 1949, he was arrested, tortured, wounded and expelled from school for joining campus-wide protests. But his most difficult times came in 1950 when the Korean War broke out. Because of his prior arrest, Yun was detained, and had been condemned to be executed by a firing squad before he miraculously escaped at the last moment. In 1956, Yun was again imprisoned for six months in Seodaemun Prison, not only for having taken part in the student movement while attending Seoul National University, but also for drawing portraits for the North Korean army while Seoul was occupied.

After his release, Yun transferred to Hongik University, where Kim was leading the art department, and graduated in 1957. In the following year, he started teaching art in high schools and submitted his works to the second and third “Engagement” exhibitions (1962, 1963, at the Central Public Information Center, Seoul). He held his first solo exhibition in 1966 at the Press Center Gallery, also located in Seoul, and in 1969 he presented his works at the 10th São Paulo Art Biennial. Yun's early works during the 1960s generally consist of lyrical and fantastical abstract paintings with blue backgrounds. Only a few of his works from the 60s survive, but from their simple forms, brilliant use of colors, and subtle texture, one can clearly see Kim Whanki's influence.

In the 1970s, Yun once again found himself in deep trouble. When Yun was teaching at Sookmyung Girls' High School in October 1972, he was unfairly charged with violating "anti-communist laws" for disclosing corruption at the school. As a result, Yun was taken to the Korean Central Intelligence Agency, and was detained in Seodaemun Prison for about a month. Even after his release, he was blacklisted until 1980, meaning that he could not find a proper job and had to be under police surveillance.

== Artistic Style ==
It was not until 1973, the year Yun was released from prison, that he began dedicating himself fully to painting. Notably, it was during this period that he began to produce works in his own distinctive style which were shown during his solo exhibitions at Myongdong Gallery(1973, 1974) and Munheon Gallery(1975, 1976), Seoul, as well as in Tokyo at Muramatsu Gallery(1976) and Tokyo Gallery(1978). His works created from late 1974 until the mid-1980s are mostly made up of a rectangular canvas featuring a large portion of unmarked space flanked by two, occasionally three, columnar dark sections running up and down the entire height of the canvas. Placing a thick cotton or hemp canvas on the floor, Yun drew broad lines from top to bottom, adding his oil colors layer upon layer until the outer edges of the canvas glowed with deep near-black. In these early years, Yun explained the thesis of his paintings as “the gate of heaven and earth.” To Yun, who used only two alternating colors, blue and umber, “blue [was] the color of heaven, while umber [was] the color of earth. Thus, [Yun called] them ‘heaven and earth,’ with the gate serving as the composition.” As Sid Sachs remarked, “what seems casual initially: non-relational, non-compositional, turns out to be a discrete sensibility, fully conscious, wholly formed.” With only minor variations, Yun continued with this artistic practice for about 40 years.

Although Yun was a senior member of the Dansaekhwa group, his preference was not to categorize himself merely as a so-called ‘Dansaekhwa Artist.’ Undergoing such turbulence throughout his early life, Yun attached more importance to human beings, society and nature than art itself. Corresponding to his own words, “you can’t make art from theory. I truly believe that eternal and fragrant art can only come from a pure and innocent person,” Yun remained thoroughly faithful to a mode of living uniquely suited to his personal idiosyncrasies. Therefore, it is commonly said that one can sense a strong self-imposed discipline oozing out from his works. Every additional stroke and repetitive process by Yun is not really meant to be an endeavor towards a certain goal, nor to be better. It is rather a continuous routine and repetition, as in living a life. As Yun described, “[his] paintings are like a diary that [he used] to record each day.” The outcome of Yun’s weighty brushstrokes of a trained body and mind results in a peculiar presence built out of real energy fields on the physical material surface of a canvas; invisible to the eye but present.

Somehow, Yun's works from later years became even simpler and more stringent in terms of their forms, colors, and process. The subtle differences among the hues disappeared, and the colors were almost purely black. Also, the surfaces became drier resulting from the reduction in the use of oil. Most of Yun's late works were painted in a more concrete form: he drew rectangles on canvas with a ruler and a pencil, covered the edges of the rectangles with tapes, and then removed the tape after painting within the taped area. But these seemingly simple works have a hidden depth just as all Yun’s works do- gazing into the large black void is like plunging into a deep abyss.

This kind of 'being' began to gain recognition in the west, followed by several remarkable solo exhibitions at Galerie Humanite, Nagoya (1990, 1991); Inkong Gallery, Seoul (1991); and Gallery Yamaguchi, Osaka (1989, 1992). In Europe, starting from "Working with Nature" in 1992, at the Tate Gallery Liverpool, Yun took part in the inaugural exhibition of the Korean pavilion at the Venice Biennale in 1995. Hyundai Gallery in Seoul organized a solo show at the Basel Art Fair in 1997, and in 1998, Manfred Wandel brought together 70 of Yun's works at the Stiftung für Konkrete Kunst, in Reutlingen, Germany. During Yun's stay in Paris, Galerie Jean Brolly showed works at a couple of exhibitions in the early 2000s. On the other side of the ocean, in the US, Donald Judd, greatly impressed by Yun's work at first sight, invited him to exhibit at the Donald Judd Foundation in New York(1993), and at the Chinati Foundation in Marfa(1994, 1996).

== Recent exhibitions ==
In recent exhibitions, after Yun's death, his works still have a strong tendency to be understood together with Dansaekhwa, viewing him as the main figure who had led the movement. Yun's works were shown in various group exhibitions along with his contemporary Dansaekhwa artists: "Korean Abstract Painting: 10 Perspectives", Seoul Museum of Art, Seoul(2011), "Dansaekhwa: Korean Monochrome Painting", National Museum of Modern and Contemporary Art, Seoul, and Jeonbuk Museum of Art, Wanju (2012); "The Art of Dansaekhwa", Kukje Gallery, Seoul(2014); "Seoul Paris Seoul", Musée Cernuschi, Paris (2016); "Rhythm in Monochrome Korean Abstract Painting", Tokyo Opera City Art Gallery, Tokyo (2017); and "The Ascetic Path: Korean DANSAEKHWA", Erarta Museum of Contemporary Art, Saint Petersburg (2017).

In the meantime, there have been various essential exhibitions re-framing and redefining Yun's distinctive style, especially the solo exhibitions in the late 2010s held by PKM Gallery as the representative of his estate. Yun's works have been exhibited in other prominent galleries such as Blum and Poe, Axel Vervoordt Gallery, Simon Lee Gallery and David Zwirner. Above all, it was Yun's first posthumous major retrospective held at National Museum of Modern and Contemporary Art, Seoul in 2018, which provided a comprehensive understanding of Yun's life and his artistic style. The exhibition attracted roughly 100,000 visitors in four months and, the duration of the exhibition was extended for an additional two months. Thereafter, the retrospective traveled to the Palazzo Fortuny in Venice and coincided with the 58th Venice Biennale. The Palazzo Fortuny exhibition was described as one of the best off-site and collateral exhibition during the Biennale period.

== Collections ==
Public collections that hold Yun's works include: National Museum of Modern and Contemporary Art, Korea; Leeum, Samsung Museum of Art, Seoul, Korea; Seoul Museum of Art, Seoul, Korea; Gwangju Museum of Art, Gwangju, Korea; Daegu Art Museum, Daegu, Korea; Seoul National University Museum of Art, Seoul, Korea; Hongik Museum of Art, Seoul, Korea; Gachon University, Seongnam, Korea; Tokyo Metropolitan Art Museum, Tokyo, Japan; Fukuoka Art Museum, Fukuoka, Japan; Hiroshima City Museum of Contemporary Art, Hiroshima, Japan; Mie Prefectural Art Museum, Mie, Japan; M+ Museum, Hong Kong, Hong Kong; The Chinati Foundation, Marfa, Texas, USA; Art Institute of Chicago, Chicago, IL, USA; Glenstone Museum, Potomac, MD, USA; Tate Modern, London, United Kingdom; Stiftung für Konkrete Kunst, Reutlingen, Germany; and The George Economou Collection, Athens, Greece.
