= Chung Sanghwa =

South Korean painter (1932–2026)

Chung Sanghwa (Korean: 정상화; Hanja: 鄭相和; April 13, 1932 – January 28, 2026) was a South Korean minimalist and Dansaekhwa artist. After receiving his BFA from the College of Fine Arts in Seoul National University in 1956, Chung developed his unique grid-like painting style in Japan and France in the late 1970s and early 1980s. Coming from a generation of post-war South Korean artists, Chung's reductive process of painting consists of repetitive application and removal of the paint on canvas.

== Early life and career ==
Chung Sanghwa was born in April 1932 in Yeongdeok County (영덕; 盈德), North Gyeongsang Province, Japanese-occupied Korea. He received his undergraduate degree in painting in Seoul National University College of Fine Arts in 1956. In university, he focused on painting figurative and representational images, but slowly moved on to "experimenting with atypical informel-style painting." In the Korean art scene of the 1950s, Chung Sanghwa developed fascination with the materiality of canvas and paint and approached painting as if he were sculpting a three-dimensional work amidst the "whirlwind of the Informel movement."

He participated in the 1958 group exhibition for the Contemporary Artists Association (현대미술가협회), the 1962 Actuel Group (악튀엘) exhibition, and the 1963 exhibition for the Congress for Cultural Freedom (CCF, 세계문화자유회의) and gradually engaged with monochrome, minimalism, and art informel. After graduating, he trained in Paris for a year in 1967, painted in Kobe, Japan from 1969 to 1976, and then again in Paris from 1977 to 1992. He participated in the 4th Paris Biennale in 1965 and the 10th and 12th São Paulo Biennial in 1967 and 1973.

Chung lived through the Korean War (1950–1953) and formed part of the post-war generation of South Korean artists. In expressing shared contemporary emotions of loss, anxiety, and fear from the ideological conflicts and formidable violence experienced from the war, Chung initially used bold colours and course material, but slowly shifted toward monochrome work during his time at Kobe in the 1970s, later developing his famous grid structures in the late 70s and early 1980s. While his works of the 1960s were created by drawing grids and filling in the squares with colour, works from the 1970s employed the new method of "removal" and "filling in" space.

After working in Paris for a year in 1967, Chung moved to Kobe where he was closer to home after his wife fell ill. There, he experimented with diverse techniques and media including paper, print-making, décollage, and frottage, creating his own visual vocabulary in the process. Interacting with Gutai artists, Chung Sanghwa continued to build and refine his style throughout the 1970s. With his mother-in-law's encouragement, Chung continued to paint in Paris even after his wife's death until 1992, after which he returned to South Korea and set up his studio at Yeoju, Gyeonggi Province.

== Method ==
The identity of Chung Sanghwa's works is most evident in his methodology. The pattern of the "endless process of adding and subtracting on top of the demarcated surface" is a system that forms a saturated plane and depth onto the space of the canvas. Chung's gridworks have been described as an intermediary plane that connects internal and external space; rather than a physical and solid barrier that separates the two spaces, Chung's method of "emptying and filling in" is a way of viewing them as coexistent and interactive realm of consciousness. The technique is closer to sculpting or throwing pottery than 'painting' and is comparable to the sanggam inlay technique (상감기법) in ceramics in which layers of clay are sliced off and in their absence, a white slip is inserted to form patterns.

The technical components of Chung Sanghwa's artistic practice were laborious and are interpreted as a "record of his encounter with material." He began by forming 1.5–5.0 mm layers of pictorial surface composed of a mixture of kaolin and wood glue, onto which he carved in 'fractures' by repeatedly folding the loosened canvas. After this, he reattached the canvas onto the wooden frame and modularized the surface by cutting out individual squares and refilling them with multiple layers of paint until he achieved the desired texture and depth. Chung Sanghwa stated that the manual labour formed an integral part of his methodology; he did not hire apprentices or assistants and as most of his works are large, many of his works took over a year to complete. He explained that his works were never spontaneous; rather, they were deliberate accumulations and careful coordinations of temporal sensations, instinctive thoughts, and psychological labour that came together in the form of countless pixels.

As his works came to bear the form of complete abstraction in Kobe from 1973, he replaced vivid colours with monochromes. Chung Sanghwa's monochrome, however, consists of numerous variants of the same colour. Most of his works are in delicate shades of white or blue. According to the artist, blue is refreshing and can express subtle and mysterious changes of shades, while white has a strong presence and is effective and transparent in displaying the content or the process of his works. No two works are of the identical colour and Chung demonstrates strict control of his layering of acrylic paint that seep through individual surfaces of the pixelated canvas and varying depths of kaolin to form unique arrays of colours.

== Later career ==
Chung Sanghwa's grid-structures had more or less been perfected by his second residence in Paris in the late 1970s and his methodology of "peeling off and filling in" had matured into sophistication. He maintained his artistic practices and stylistic characteristics he had formulated in Paris throughout the majority of his career and even after he returned to South Korea.

He held national and international exhibitions, including From All Sides: Tansaekhwa on Abstraction (2015) at Blum & Poe Gallery in Los Angeles. In 2015, Chung Sanghwa's paintings were included in Frieze New York Art Fair. Gallery Hyundai (갤러리현대, Seoul, Korea) organized more than 25 of Chung's exhibitions, including 9 solo shows from 1983 onwards. Beginning in 1996, Chung continued to work in his recluded studio in Yeoju. Chung's works are in permanent collections of many prestigious art institutions including the Samsung Leeum Museum of Art, the Seoul Museum of Art, the National Museum of Modern Art in Tokyo, the Shizuoka Prefectural Museum of Art and the Fukuoka Asian Art Museum. Like many other Dansaekhwa artists, Chung Sanghwa achieved significant commercial success, particularly from the 2010s, and his works have often been sold or auctioned off at record prices.

== Death ==
Chung died on January 28, 2026, at the age of 93.

== See also ==
- Dansaekhwa
- Monochrome painting
- Abstract expressionism
- Mono-ha
- Lee U-Fan
