= Gallery Hyundai =

South Korean contemporary art gallery

Coordinates: 37.5772°N 126.9799°E

Gallery Hyundai (Korean: 갤러리현대) is a contemporary art gallery in Seoul, South Korea. It was founded in 1970, initially in Insadong. It moved to Samcheong-ro, Sagan-dong in 1975.

The founder and president of the gallery, Park Myung-ja introduced modern and contemporary art to the Korean public. Many exhibitions were held throughout the past four decades, including paintings by Philippe Pasqua, Lee Ufan, Kim Tschangyeul, Kim Whanki, Lee Joongseob, Chung Sanghwa and Park Su-geun. Also video artist, Paik Nam June held multiple solo exhibitions at Gallery Hyundai, and in 1990, Paik performed a shamanic ritual called A pas de Loup de Séoul à Budapest in the back courtyard of Gallery Hyundai to commemorate Joseph Beuys' death. Starting from 1987, Gallery Hyundai started to participate in international art fairs such as Art Chicago (1987–1992, 1996), FIAC (1995, 1996, 1999), Art Basel (1997–2002, 2004), Frieze Masters London (2014) and Frieze New York(2012–2015). 2015 marks Gallery Hyundai's 45th anniversary since its opening.

== History ==
Gallery Hyundai was founded on April 4, 1970. It is the longest running contemporary art gallery in Korea and has hit its 50th year anniversary in 2020. It was founded with the name of Hyundai Hwarang and the first place of activity was in Insadong, a famous and important area of Seoul for antiques and art market. Gallery Hyundai focused on the scene of contemporary Korean art of that time, opening exhibitions for artists and stimulating the production of new works of art, working as a bridge for artists and art dealers. Gallery Hyundai was the first commercial gallery in Korea specializing in contemporary expressions of art. It played a relevant role in the development of Korea's contemporary art infrastructure. Hyundai Hwarang relocated its gallery in Sagan-dong in 1975 and from this time started to actively communicate with the international art sphere and hosting exhibitions of Korean artists famous abroad. In 1987 changed its name to Gallery Hyundai and in the same year participated to the very first international art fair in Korea, the Chicago Art Fair, to expand its interest abroad. During this period, the Gallery focused on supporting economically the artists, also thank to the important economic growth that South Korea was encountering in those years. Among the artists they supported, there is names such as Nam June Paik, Chang Yeol Kim and U Fan Lee. In 2002 Gallery Hyundai opened two parallel galleries called respectively Doo Art Gallery and Doo Gaheon Gallery, in order to give opportunities of recognition to young artists. In May 2006, Park Myung Ja's second son Do Hyeong Tae has succeeded her in the role of representative.

Its founder is Park Myung Ja, that is considered the first modern gallerist of Korea. The goal of Park Myung Ja was to mend the ruptures between Korea's modern and contemporary art worlds and to boost the careers of major artists. She enjoyed painting in her youth and graduated Sookmyung Girls' High School. She started working at Bando Hwarang in the 1960s. After nine years of working as a gallery clerk, she opened her own gallery Hyundai Hwarang in 1970. She has affirmed that teachers and artists such as Do Sang Bong, Cheon Gyeong Ja and Kim Ki Chang encouraged her to open the gallery. In the 1980s, she encouraged the internationally renowned artist Nam June Paik to work with Samsung Electronics, thus recognizing his Korean identity in his multimedia art.

== Exhibitions ==
Hyundai Hwarang opened with the exhibition 'Kim Ki Chang, Park Soo Geum' in 1970. Then followed the exhibitions 'Lee Jung Seop' in 1972 and Gyeong Ja Cheon's 'Flowers and Women' in 1973. After the success of these exhibitions and the several feedbacks about the exhibition space in Insadong being too small, curator and founder Park Myung Ja decided to move the gallery in Samcheong-dong in 1975. Among the artists who have exhibited their art in Gallery Hyundai there is important names such as Kim Hwan Ki, Cheon Kyung Ja, Lee Jung Seop and Park Soo Geun. There are also artists related to the Dansaekhwa movement such as Hyung Geun Yoon, U Hwan Lee, Park Seo Bo, Chang Yeol Kim and Sang Hwa Jeong. At Gallery Hyundai, Kim Hwan Ki's work <Universe> was sold for 13.2 billion won, the highest price among Korean works of art.

Other artists include Kwak In Sik, Kwon Young Woo, Kwon Ok Yeon, Kim Ki Rin, Kim Ki Chang, Kim Sang Yu, Nam Kwan, Do Sang Bong, Ryu Gyeong Chae, Moon Shin, Munhak-jin, Park Go Seok, Byeon Gwan Sik, Byun Jong Ha, Seo Se Ok, Sung Jae Hye, Shin Sung Hee, Oh Ji Ho, Yoo Young Guk, Yoon Jung Sik, Lee Dae Won, Lee Sang Beom, Lee Seong Ja, Lee Seung Jo, Lee Eung No, Im Jik Soon, Jang Woo Sung, Jang Uk Jin, Jonbae, Choi Young Rim, Han Mook, and many others participated in exhibitions at Gallery Hyundai through the years.

Nam June Paik, who received the Golden Lion Award at the 1993 Venice Biennale for his work <Marco Polo>, has had a deep connection with Gallery Hyundai. On July 20, 1990, Nam June Paik performed his work A Pas de Loup (With the Steps of the Wolf) in the format of a shamanic ritual. Joseph Beuys and Nam June Paik promised to have a grand gut performance in Korea. Four years after Joseph Beuys died, Paik delivered a performance in the format of a shamanic ritual to commemorate Beuys in Seoul, and the promise was fulfilled. Paik became a shaman and by the use of a broken piano and slit-cut fedora hats in the place of Beuys, these two artists' artistic ideals mingled in a joyful shamanistic performance. The traditional ritual setting was in the backyard of the gallery and the space in front was only for Paik; the ritual space contained 16 empty TV sets and a broken piano revealing its insides. This performance was recorded as a video for broadcast by CANAL Plus in France and KBS in Korea and was soon aired in all of Europe and Korea.

Gallery Hyundai also hosted important exhibitions from international artists throughout the years, as for example Jesùs Raphael Soto, François Morellet, Kawara, Michael Craig-Martin and the "Spider Artist" Tomàs Saraceno.

For the Gallery 50th anniversary in 2020, a major exhibition was organized. This exhibition redrew the history of Gallery Hyundai and gathered works of art from the most important and influential artists that Gallery Hyundai has hosted through the years.
