= Joan Kee =

American art historian

- Known for: Scholarship on Dansaekhwa; art and law

Academic background
- Education: Yale College (BA); Harvard Law School (JD); Institute of Fine Arts, New York University (PhD)

Academic work
- Discipline: Art history
- Sub-discipline: Modern and contemporary art
- Institutions: University of Michigan; Institute of Fine Arts, New York University
- Notable works: Contemporary Korean Art: Tansaekhwa and the Urgency of Method (2013); Models of Integrity: Art and Law in Post-Sixties America (2019)

Joan Kee is an American art historian specializing in modern and contemporary art who serves as Judy and Michael Steinhard Director of New York University's Institute of Fine Arts. She has previously served as Professor in the History of Art at the University of Michigan.

== Academic career ==
Kee earned her PhD at New York University Institute of Fine Arts. Her supervisor was Shitao scholar Jonathan Hay. Research for her dissertation was supported by an Andrew W. Mellon Foundation Fellowship from the Center for Advanced Study in the Visual Arts, National Gallery of Art, Washington DC. Kee also obtained a JD from Harvard Law School and a BA from Yale College, where she graduated magna cum laude.

Her first book, Contemporary Korean Art: Tansaekhwa and the Urgency of Method, published by University of Minnesota Press in 2013, is credited with sparking global interest in Dansaekhwa, a major constellation of abstract paintings produced in South Korea from the 1960s. In 2014, she curated From All Sides: Tansaekhwa and the Urgency of Method, a group show of representative Tansaekhwa artists that was widely acclaimed. She has been cited as Tansaekhwa's most prominent Anglophone scholar.

Kee's latest book – The Geometries of Afro Asia: Art beyond Solidarity, published April 2023 – presents a framework for understanding the rich and surprisingly understudied relationship between Black and Asian artists and the worlds they initiate through their work. Her previous book, Models of Integrity Art and Law in Post-Sixties America, includes discussion of the following artists, among others; Christo and Jeanne-Claude, Gordon Matta-Clark, Tehching Hsieh, Felix Gonzalez-Torres and Sally Mann. Kee is a contributing editor to Artforum, advisory editor to the Oxford Art Journal, editor at large for the Brooklyn Rail, and also sits on the international advisory board of Art History. She has been cited in reference to artists like Zao Wou-ki, Gordon Matta-Clark, and to Park Seobo.

=== Selected publications ===
- Contemporary Southeast Asian Art: The Right Kind of Trouble, Third Text, vol. 30, 2011
- Contemporary Korean Art: Tansaekhwa and the Urgency of Method, University of Minnesota Press, Minnesota, 2013
- Contemporary Art in Early Colonial Korea: The Self Portraits of Ko Hui-dong, Art History 36:2, p392-417, April 2013
- Towards Law as an Artistic Medium: William E. Jones' Tearoom, Law, Culture and the Humanities, May 27, 2014
- What Scale Affords Us: Sizing Up the World Through Scale, Art Margins 3:2, p3-30, June 2014
- To Scale, co-editor with Emanuele Lugli, Malden: Wiley-Blackwell, 2015
- From All Sides: Tansaekhwa on Abstraction, Blum & Poe, Los Angeles, 2015
- The Measure of the World: Scenes From a Journey to Kaesŏng, Art History 38:2, p364-385, April 2015
- Why Performance in Authoritarian Korea, Tate Papers 23, May 2015
- Orders of Law in the One Year Performances of Tehching Hsieh, American Art (journal), 30, no. 1, Spring 2016
- Art Chasing Law: The Case of Yoko Ono's Rape, Law and Literature (journal), June 2016
- How Art and Law Can Work Together Beyond the Marketplace, with Sonia K. Katyal, Hyperallergic, January 12, 2017
- Modern Art in Late Colonial Korea, a Research Experiment, Modernism/modernity, vol. 25, no. 2, April 2018
- Models of Integrity: Art and Law in Post-Sixties America, University of California Press, February 2019
- The Geometries of Afro Asia: Art beyond Solidarity, University of California Press, April 2023

=== Selected appearances ===
- In 2018, she appeared in Kader Attia's video installation Shifting Borders, commissioned for the Gwangju Biennale.

=== Fellowships and awards ===
- Erwin Panofsky Fellowship, Institute of Fine Arts, New York University, 2003-2008
- Andrew W. Mellon Predoctoral Fellow, Center for Advanced Study in the Visual Arts, National Gallery of Art, 2007
