= Sagan-dong =

- Interactive map of Sagan-dong
- Country: South Korea

Area
  - Total: 0.03 km^{2} (0.012 sq mi)

Korean name
- Hangul: 사간동
- Hanja: 司諫洞
- RR: Sagan-dong
- MR: Sagan-dong

The Central Council of the Taego Order of Korean Buddhism in the Sagan-dong

Sagan-dong (Korean: 사간동) is a dong (neighbourhood) of Jongno District, Seoul, South Korea. It is a legal dong (법정동) administered under its administrative dong (행정동), Samcheong-dong.

== See also ==
- Administrative divisions of South Korea
