= Tina Kim (art dealer) =

Tina Kim is an art dealer and gallery owner based in New York. She is the founder of the Tina Kim Gallery in Chelsea, Manhattan widely recognized along with its affiliate Kukje Gallery in Seoul, South Korea as a leading gallery for modern and contemporary art. Tina Kim and her mother Hyun-Sook Lee, CEO of Kukje Gallery, have jointly been in the art business for more than 40 years.

After graduating from Pepperdine University, Kim moved to New York City to attend New York University, where she earned a master's degree in arts administration and later worked at Sotheby's, Paula Cooper Gallery, and the Whitney Museum of American Art. In 2002 Kim established the Tina Kim Gallery with the goal of broadening the audience for Korean artists in the West. Since then, Kim has hosted exhibitions by artists such as Yeondoo Jung, Eemyun Kang, Marc Andre Robinson, Joanna M. Wezyk, and Kibong Rhee. Kim has also collaborated with Kukje Gallery to exhibit master and emerging designers such as Jean Prouvé, Charlotte Perriand and Joris Laarman, among others.
