= Lee Dong-youb =

South Korean painter

- Hangul: 이동엽
- Hanja: 李東熀
- RR: I Dongyeop
- MR: I Tongyŏp

Lee Dong-youb (Korean: 이동엽; born 1946) is a contemporary art painter in South Korea. As one of artists leading Korean Abstract Painting, he has developed his own philosophy about what contemporary art can propose after Post-modernism. The main subjects of his work are mutual relationship, cycling resonance and dynamic condition between original being and the environment.

== Life ==
Born in 1946, Lee Dong Youb graduated from Hong-Ik University and the graduate school. He got married with Lee Hye-Ran, the founder of Seoul Gallery where he held the first solo exhibition, in 1977. He has had solo exhibitions more than ten times such as in Seoul and Tokyo. He has participated in many group exhibitions in Japan, Seoul, New York, and Paris including the first `Independent' exhibition which sponsored by Korean Fine Arts Association. He lives in Seoul with his family.

== Awards ==
- 1980 Grand Prize at the 7th Korean Fine Art Grand Prize Exhibition, Hankuk Ilbo, Seoul
- 1978 Special Selection at the 1st Grand Exhibition, Joongang Ilbo, Seoul
- 1978 Excellent Frontier Prize at the 5th Grand Exhibition of Korean Fine Arts, Hankuk Ilbo, Seoul
- 1974 Prize at the 6th Cagness International Painting Festival, Cagness, France
- 1972 Grand Prize at the 1st Independents, Korean Fine Arts Association, Seoul

== See also ==
- Ontology
- cycle
- Void
- White space
- Zen
- Taoism
- Minimalism
- Monochrome painting
- Abstract expressionism
- Monoha
- Lee U-Fan
