= Tina Kim Gallery =

Art gallery

Tina Kim Gallery is a New York City-based contemporary art gallery and exhibition space. The gallery was established in 2001 by Tina Kim and is located in the Chelsea.

== Details ==
An affiliate of the Kukje Gallery in Seoul, Korea, the Tina Kim Gallery features contemporary art by emerging and established artists. The gallery represents South Korean artist Yeondoo Jung, named as one of Art+Auction's 50 Next Most Collectible Artists. Tina Kim Gallery also offers secondary market works by 20th Century masters and present-day artists, and works closely with Vintage 20, a Manhattan-based dealer specializing in European mid-century furniture and decorative art. Founded in 2001 by second-generation gallerist, Tina Kim, it is noted for working closely with museums and institutions to expand the audience of its global roster of artists.
