= Daejeon Museum of Art =

Museum in Daejeon, South Korea

Coordinates: 36.3668°N 127.3858°E

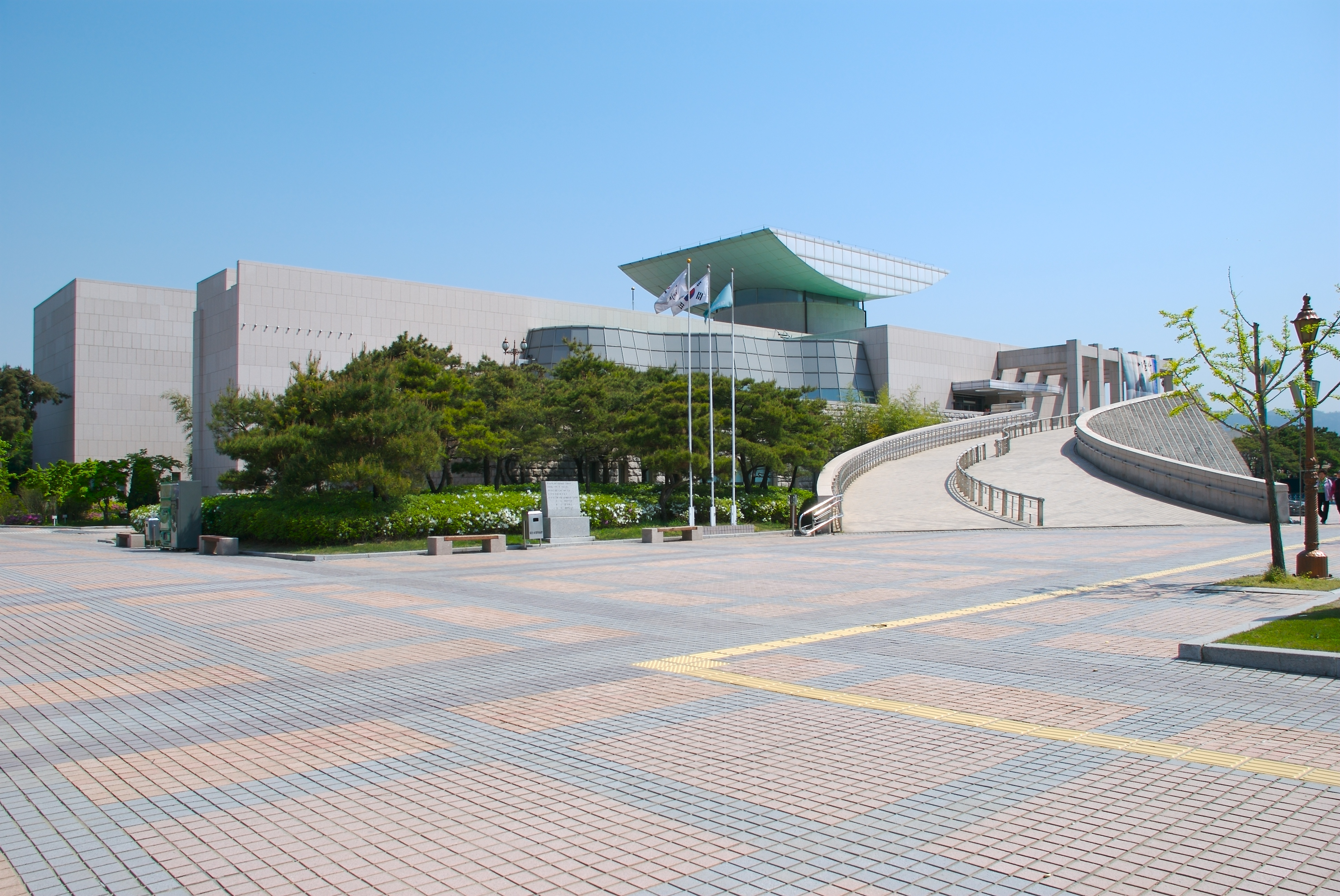

Korean name
- Hangul: 대전시립미술관
- Hanja: 大田市立美術館
- RR: Daejeon sirip misulgwan
- MR: Taejŏn sirip misulgwan

The Daejeon Museum of Art (Korean: 대전시립미술관; or Daejeon Metropolitan Museum of Arts) is located at 396 Mannyeon-dong, Seo-gu, across the river from the Expo Science Park, in Daejeon, South Korea. It opened on April 15, 1998.

It has featured modern art from both domestic and foreign artists. Shows have included "The Horizen [sic] of Daejeon Art" (local art, featuring Cho Pyung-hwi and An Chi-in) and The Exhibition of Park Seung-moo. The facility has a floor space of just over 8,400 m^{2}. It also includes an outdoor sculpture park.

== Transition ==
The Daejeon Museum of Art is a public art museum that explores trends in Korean contemporary art in general and seeks to spread the arts and culture in civil society through exhibition and educational policies. In 2008, Daejeon City Museum of Art Creation Center was opened. Daejeon Museum of Art serves as a major public art museum contributing to the spread of art culture.

The museum's facilities includes an exhibition room, bookstore, auditorium, seminar room, resource room, training room, fountain park, and lawn park, and has a collection of 1,100 items.

== See also ==
- National Science Museum
