= Busan Museum of Art =

Museum in Busan, South Korea

Coordinates: 35.16674°N 129.13708°E

Museum exterior (2018)

The Busan Museum of Art (Korean: 부산시립미술관; Hanja: 釜山市立美術館) is an art museum in Haeundae, Busan, South Korea. Opened in 1998, it houses collections of modern and contemporary art, with a focus on Korean artists. The museum also operates the Space Lee Ufan annex, dedicated to the works and artistic philosophy of Korean artist Lee Ufan, and hosts exhibitions, educational programmes and cultural events.

Its facilities include an exhibition hall, archives, a children's art gallery, research spaces and an outdoor sculpture park. The museum's collections encompass sculpture, painting, ceramics and photography, and it hosts the Busan Biennale, held in even-numbered years.

== History ==
The museum opened to the public in 1998 and has three floors, two of them underground. It houses an exhibition hall, archives, a children's art gallery, a research facility and an outdoor sculpture park, and it collects sculpture, painting, ceramics and photography. It is run by Busan City and takes part in international art exchanges. The museum is reached from Busan Metro Line 2 (Busan Museum of Art Station), and admission is free. Space Lee Ufan is a separate gallery next to the museum's main building that holds a permanent exhibition of work by the artist Lee Ufan. The space marked its tenth anniversary in 2025, when the museum held a commemorative concert, and a new commission was planned for its reopening.

The museum added 27 new media works to its collection and continued building an archive by digitising art materials such as institutional and architectural records.The museum began renovations in December 2024 to improve its ageing facilities and become a 21st-century museum. After reopening, it presented the exhibition "Dear All the Yesterdays", which traces the museum's own institutional and architectural history. Seo Jinseok, the museum's director, described its aim as becoming a museum of publicness and sharing.

Its building has five floors with exhibition halls, archives, education rooms and an outdoor sculpture park. After opening, the museum expanded from exhibitions examining Busan artists and regional art history to Korean and international contemporary art, moving images, installations, archival exhibitions, education, research and cultural programs. It runs various educational programs alongside exhibitions in many genres, and one of its main events is the Busan Biennale, held in even-numbered years.
