= Leeum Museum of Art =

Art museum in Seoul, South Korea

Coordinates: 37.537969°N 126.99949°E

- 리움미술관

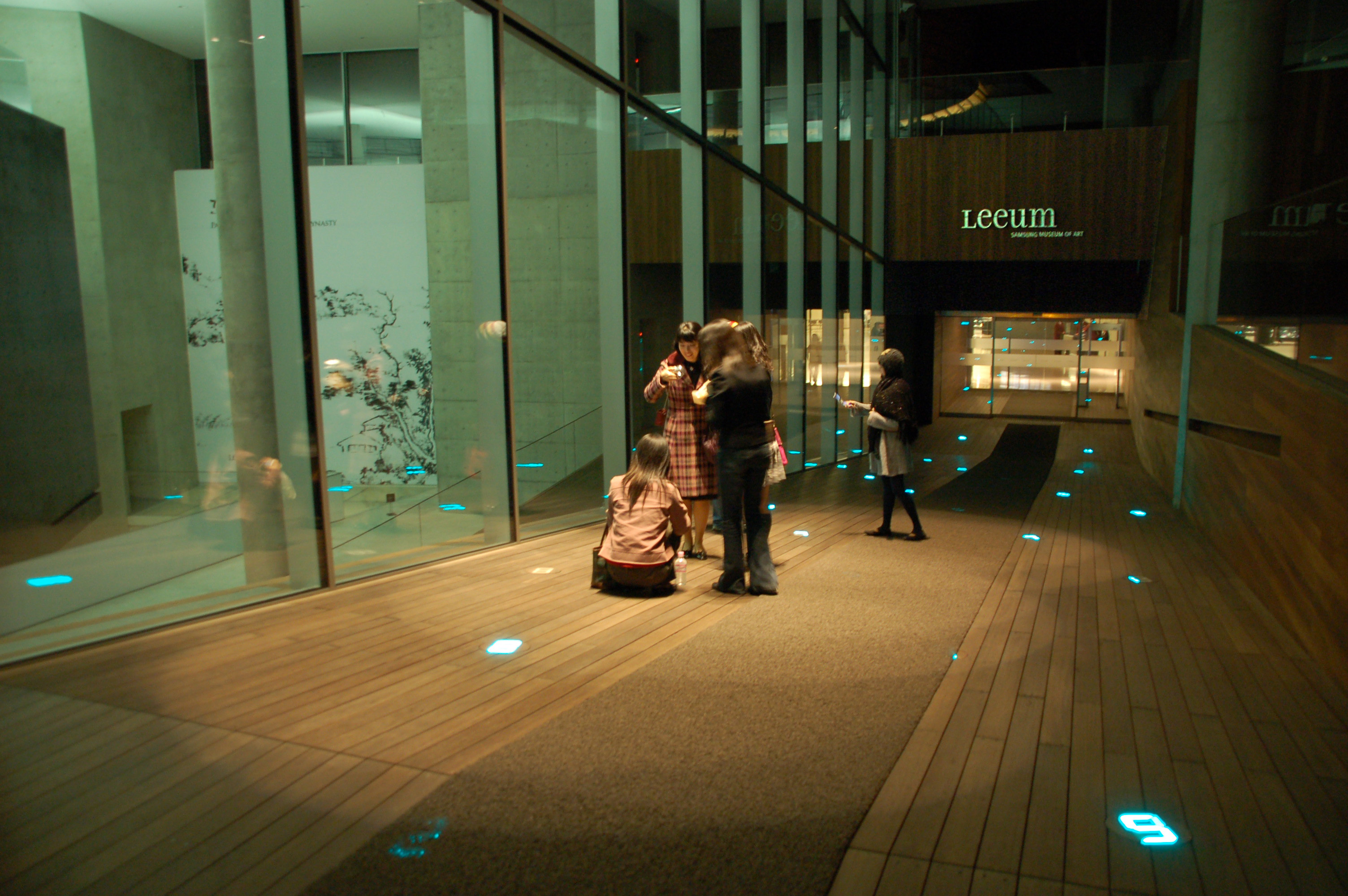
- Interactive map of the Leeum Museum of Art area

General information
- Type: Art Museum
- Location: 747-18 Hannam 2-dong, Yongsan-gu, Seoul, South Korea
- Completed: 2004
- Client: Samsung Cultural Foundation

Design and construction
- Architects: Mario Botta, Jean Nouvel, Rem Koolhaas
- Architecture firm: Mario Botta Architetto, Ateliers Jean Nouvel, Office for Metropolitan Architecture, Samoo Architects & Engineers
- Structural engineer: Chunglym Engineers
- Other designers: Landscape: Petra Blaisse
- Awards: 2005 Excellence in Design for Civic Architecture Seoul Metropolitan Government

Other information
- Public transit: Subway Line 6, Hangangjin Station, Exit 1

Website
- www.leeumhoam.org/leeum

The Leeum Museum of Art (Korean: 리움미술관) is a museum in Hannam-dong, Yongsan District, Seoul, South Korea. It is run by the Samsung Foundation of Culture. It is considered one of South Korea's top three private art museums.

The museum consists of two parts, one of which houses traditional Korean art, the other contemporary art. The first part of the museum was designed by Swiss architect Mario Botta and the second part of the museum by French architect Jean Nouvel and Dutch architect Rem Koolhaas.

== Collection ==
Rotunda of Museum 1

Museum 1 (M1) houses a collection of traditional Korean art.

Museum 2 (M2) houses modern and contemporary art from Korean and foreign artists including Damien Hirst, Andy Warhol, Mark Rothko, Yves Klein, and Donald Judd have permanent exhibition spaces.

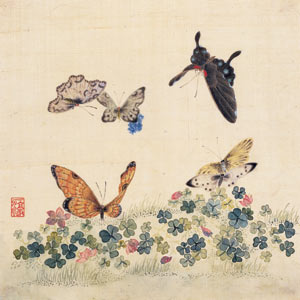
A painting on the display of flowers and butterflies painted by the 19th-century Korean painter Nam Gyewoo

== See also ==
- Ho-Am Art Museum
- List of museums in South Korea
