= National Museum of Modern and Contemporary Art =

National museum of South Korea

National Museum of Modern and Contemporary Art (MMCA)
- 국립현대미술관

- Gwacheon branch
- Established: 1969
- Location: 313 Gwangmyeong-ro, Gwacheon-si, Gyeonggi-do, South Korea
- Coordinates: 37.5785°N 126.9800°E
- Visitors: 1,171,780 (2016)
- Website: www.mmca.go.kr/eng

Korean name
- Hangul: 국립현대미술관
- Hanja: 國立現代美術館
- RR: Gungnip hyeondae misulgwan
- MR: Kungnip hyŏndae misulgwan

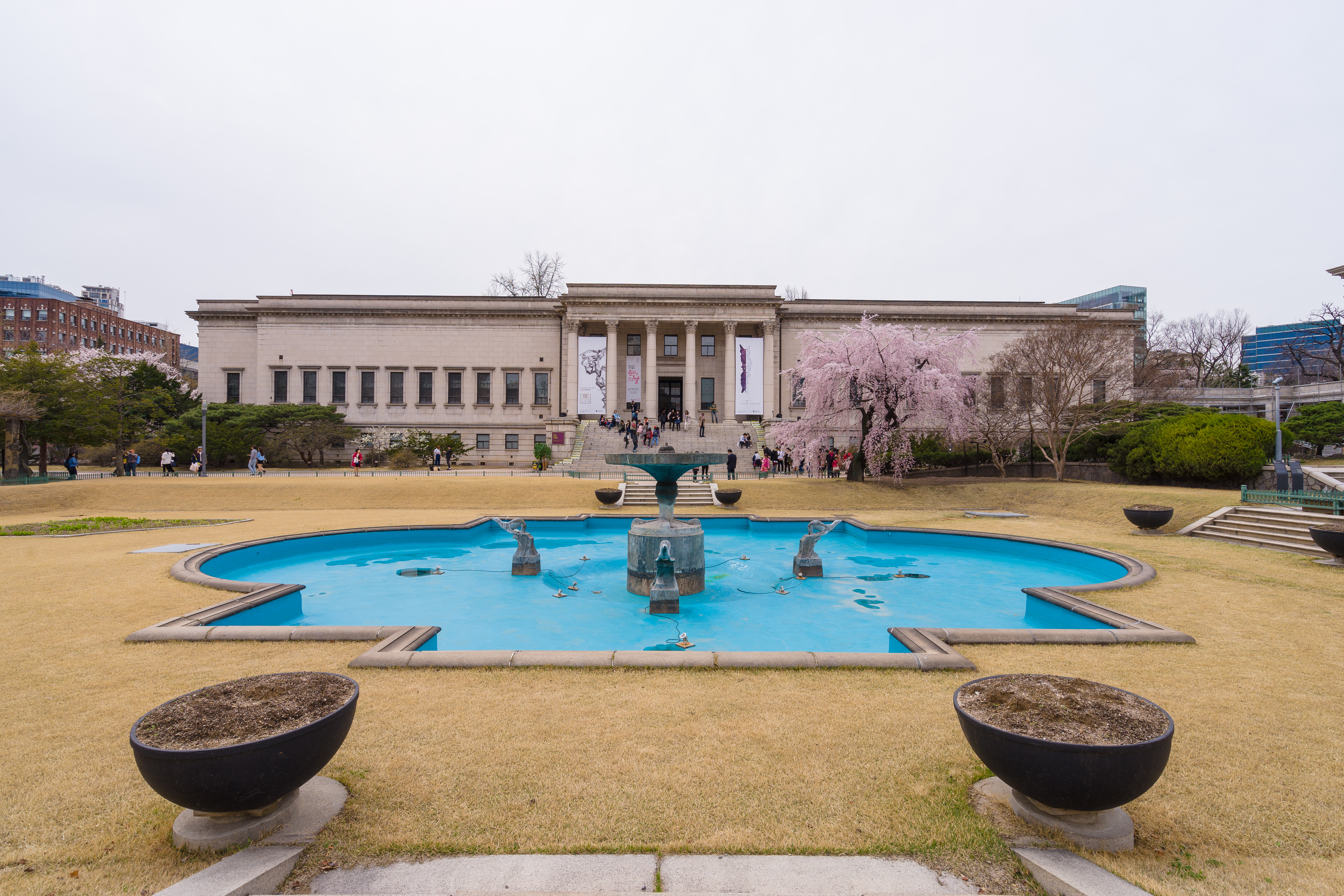
Deoksugung branch

The National Museum of Modern and Contemporary Art, Korea (MMCA; Korean: 국립현대미술관; Hanja: 國立現代美術館) is a contemporary art museum with four branches in Gwacheon, Deoksugung, Seoul and Cheongju. The museum was established in 1969 as the country's only national art museum dedicated to Korean modern and contemporary art, while also presenting international art.

== History and architectural style ==
=== Gwacheon ===
The museum was initially established in Gyeongbokgung on October 20, 1969, but was moved to Deoksugung in 1973. It was moved to Seoul Grand Park complex (Makgye-dong, Gwacheon, Gyeonggi Province, South Korea) in 1986. It is also known as Gwacheon Contemporary Art Museum (Korean: 과천현대미술관; Hanja: 果川現代美術館; RR: Gwacheonhyeondaemisulgwan). Founded to contribute to the development of Korean contemporary art by systematically conserving and exhibiting artworks created since 1910, the museum's area of 73,360 m^{2} spreads over three floors, and has an outdoor sculpture park occupying 33,000 m^{2}. The motif of the architecture is that of a traditional Korean fortress and beacon mound, and the building has a unique spiral-shaped interior where Dadaigseon, one of the most famous video artworks by Nam June Paik, is located. In recent years, MMCA has undergone changes to become more family-friendly. MMCA Gwacheon focuses on art research and family activities, covering fields including architecture, crafts, prints, and design, and also offers children's programs. The Children's Museum at MMCA Gwacheon offers hands-on programs for children and families, along with outdoor activities combining art, nature, and play.

=== Deoksugung ===
The first branch of the MMCA was established in 1998 in Seokjo-jeon of Deoksugung (Jeong-dong, Jung-gu, Seoul, South Korea), in order to further increase the museum's accessibility for people living in the northern part of Seoul. The museum has four exhibition halls, rest zones and art shops, and the total area is approximately 3,428 m^{2} (36,900 sq ft). It is located at 99 Sejong-daero, Jung-gu in Seoul. MMCA Deoksugung focuses on early modern Korean art, with its scope extending to calligraphy and literature.

=== Seoul ===
The Seoul branch of the museum opened on November 13, 2013, next to Gyeongbokgung. Built on and next to the former Military Defense Security Command building, the architectural design adopted the madang (yard) concept, which successfully integrated the exterior and interior of the building to the surrounding environment. The madang also serves as a public leisure space as well as a space to hold outdoor artistic events and programs. It is located at 30 Samcheong-ro, Sogyeok-dong, Jongno-gu in Seoul. MMCA Seoul presents Korean modern art alongside an integrated program of contemporary art.

=== Cheongju ===
The MMCA Cheongju, a storage and conservation center, opened on December 27, 2018, according to the museum's opening announcement. The museum's institutional chronology separately records December 31, 2018, as the date of its opening and organizational restructuring. It is located at 314 Sangdang-ro, Cheongwon-gu, Cheongju. MMCA Cheongju specializes in collection storage and conservation and operates an integrated system for storage, research, conservation, and exhibition. MMCA Cheongju features open storage areas on the first and third floors, where artworks are displayed in a storage-style setting rather than a conventional exhibition arrangement. The museum also provides visible storage spaces on the second and fourth floors, allowing visitors to observe collections through glass partitions. A visible conservation science laboratory introduces visitors to the processes involved in preserving artworks.

== Collections and exhibitions ==
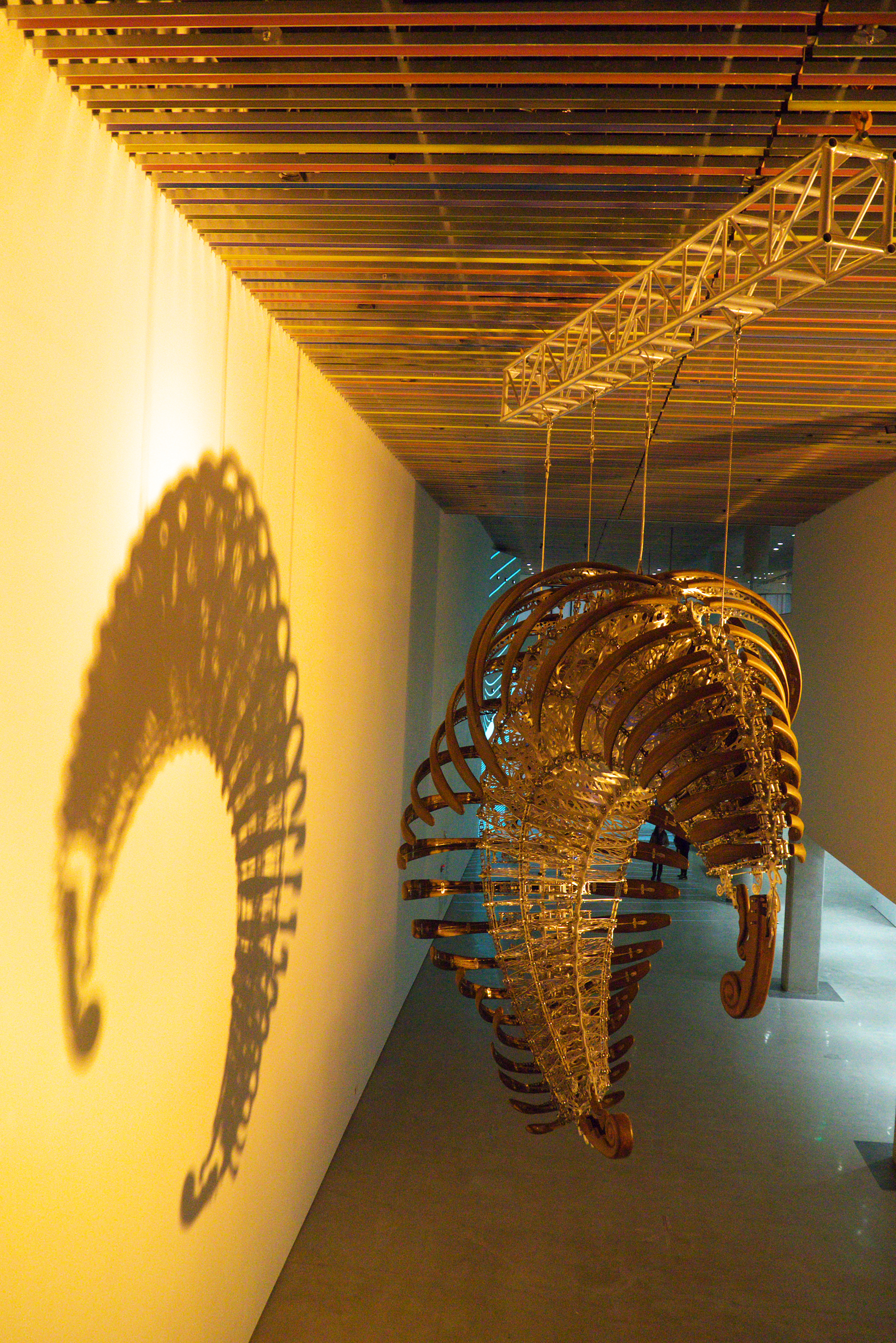
Opertus Lunula Umbra (Hidden Shadow of the Moon) by U-ram Choe at Seoul branch opening, 2013

The museum's collection includes more than 11,800 works, including works by contemporary Korean artists such as Go Hui-dong, Ku Bon-ung, Park Su-geun, and Kim Whan-ki. The museum has also gathered a substantial internationally recognized collection including artworks by Joseph Beuys, Andy Warhol, Georg Baselitz, Jörg Immendorff, Marcus Lüpertz, Nam June Paik, Nikki de Saint-Phalle, Jonathan Borofsky, and Michelangelo Pistoletto.

Past exhibitions include the installation of Sinseon Play - Moon Ji Bang as a part of the Young Architects Program at MoMA and MoMA PS1 in 2014. In 2011, the MMCA hosted the exhibition The American Art, which was "the first occasion to exhibit the Collection of Whitney Museum, in Asia," featuring artists such as Jeff Koons, Andy Warhol, and Jasper Johns. Likewise in 2010, the museum hosted the exhibition Picasso and Modern Art, which was the first exhibition of collections from the Albertina Museum (Vienna, Austria) in an East Asian country. In addition to loan exhibitions, the MMCA has mounted special exhibitions of Korean art, such as Acquisitions in Korean Art 1960–1980, and Masterpieces of Korean Modern Art: Exploration of Modern History in 2008. Since 2012, the Museum of Modern and Contemporary Art (MMCA) and SBS Cultural Foundation have co-sponsored the annual Korea Artist Prize, which recognizes and supports innovative Korean visual artists. The four artists shortlisted for the Korea Artist Prize 2021 are Bang Jeong-a, Kim Sang-jin, Oh Min and Choi Chan-sook.

In 2021, the National Museum of Modern and Contemporary Art received close to 1,500 works of art as a donation from the estate of the late Lee Kun-hee. The collection of paintings, drawings and sculptures represented the single largest contribution received by the museum "in terms of both value and scale". More than 90% of the pieces are made by contemporary Korean artists, including over 100 works by painter Lee Jung-seob and almost 70 works by craftsman Yoo Kangyul. Other notable western artists in the donation include Paul Gauguin, Pierre-Auguste Renoir, Camille Pissarro, Marc Chagall, Salvador Dalí and Joan Miró.

To marhh the opening of its Cheongju branch, the MMCA presented A Day for Counting Stars: The Story of You and Me from December 27, 2018, to August 25, 2019. The exhibition featured 23 works by 15 artists, selected from approximately 8,100 works in the museum's collection at the time. Through painting, photography, sculpture, video, and installation, the exhibition explored and installation, the exhibition explored

== Performing Arts ==
=== MMCA Performing Arts 2022: Museum-Carbon Project ===
As the global issue of climate change brought on by greenhouse gases is getting worse, a series of multidisciplinary events under MMCA Performing Arts 2022: Museum-Carbon-Project focuses on how we should adapt to climate change through discussions, exhibition waste disposal, materials and artwork manufacture, artwork packaging, and shipping process.

=== MMCA Performing Arts 2026: Deep Time ===
MMCA Performing Arts 2026: Deep Time runs from April 1 to December 6, 2026, at MMCA Seoul. The program explores "deep and slow" time as a dimension of human experience, contrasting it with the speed and goal-oriented processes of artificial intelligence.

== Departments ==
=== Education ===
The MMCA has various art education programs including professional education programs for curators, employees of museums, art teachers, and college students. The Children's Museum is located in Gwacheon main museum, where programs for elementary students, disabled students and students from poor neighborhoods are held. There is also a special support program for young artists, called 'Residency,' in which the museum provides studios for selected young artists and holds art conversations among artists and art professionals.

=== Research and conservation ===
The conservation center of the museum was first established in 1980. The center has been working to develop its modern techniques for conservation by holding exchange programs with overseas conservation centers. Currently, the center is divided into four professional departments: oil paintings, Korean traditional artworks, contemporary sculptures, and medium of artworks. Furthermore, the museum opened its 'Art Research Center' in 2013, which focuses on the research of East Asian contemporary art.

- What Do Museums Connect?: Museums in a Post-Pandemic World (2021) discusses how to define the new responsibilities that museums must play in light of contemporary cultural, social, and technical contexts.
- Research Forum: Re-inventing Archive: Design, Architecture, Visual Culture (2019) aims to create a venue for gathering, analyzing, and examining the design, architectural, and visual cultural legacies, as well as examining how to connect them to the present.
- Project Talk: The Creative Synthesis of Museum and University discusses the future of "Museum-University" which aims to connect museums with institutions.
- Worlds at Stake: Contemporary Art, Visual Culture, and Political Ecology go over the most recent findings on the end of the world and what follows next.
- What Do Museums Change? — Art and Democracy addresses specific action plans to make modern museums and support movements outside of institutions for quick advancement and community transformation.
- “What Do Museums Collect?” explores the functions of museums through a number of crucial verbs, including "study" and "collect," which are issues that are particularly important right now because of the flux in the policies and curatorial trajectories surrounding art and artwork.

=== Art Bank ===
The MMCA operates an Art Bank program established in February 2005 to support artists and broaden public access to art. The program purchases artworks and makes them available for rental or exhibition at public ons, private offices, and cultural organizations. Selected works are also displayed at Korean diplomatic missions overseas, extending the reach of Korean modern and contemporary art.

- Government Art Bank

A separate Government Art Bank was established in October 2012 to improve the acquisition and management of artworks used by government institutions. Under an annual purchasing program, selected artworks are acquired for display in government offices and at major national events. The initiative is intended to make artworks more accessible in everyday public spaces.

=== Publications ===
- MMCA Artist Studies 1 IM Heung-soon: Toward a Poetics of Opacity and Hauntology (2018)

IM Heung-soon’s work from the late 1990s to the present is studied in MMCA Artist Studies. IM has experienced trauma related to the Vietnam War, the women's labour movement, and the Jeju Uprising, which lead him to transform his past experience into contemporary art. This book's title in Korean is "Red, Blue, and Yellow” and was changed to "IM Heung-soon: Towards the Poetics of Opacity and Hauntology".

- What Museums Do 2 〈What Do Museums Collect?〉(2019)

This book discusses a wide range of topics, including the practice of inclusion and the function of modern museums in relation to cultural diversity.

- MMCA Artist Studies 2 Park Chan-kyong: Red Asia Complex (2019)

The idea behind the book's title, Red Asia Complex, has long been present in both Park's writing and art. The "Asia complex" proposes the postcolonial perspective if the "Red complex" is the motivating factor behind the mental geography that Park has investigated in relation to Korea's Cold War division culture.

- MMCA Studies 13: Exhibition Histories (2021)

This publication is focusing on the theme of exhibition history which includes the approach to studying art history, the role of exhibition design, and analysis of the examination of Young Korean Artists in 1981.

== Directors ==
- KIM Yim-ryong (1969-1970)
- CHO Seong-gil (1970-1971)
- PARK Sang-ryeong (1971-1972)
- JANG Sang-gyu (1972-1973)
- PARK Ho-joon (1973)
- SON Seok-joo (1973-1977)
- YUN Chi-oh (1977-1980)
- YUN Tak (1980-1981)
- LEE Kyungsung (1981-1983, 1986-1992)
- KIM Se-joong (1983-1986)
- LIM Young-bang (1992-1997)
- CHOI Man-lin (1997-1999)
- OH Kwangsoo (1999-2003)
- KIM Yoon-soo (2008-2009)
- SIM Dong-sup (2008-2009, acting director)
- BAE Soon-hoon (2009-2011)
- YOON Nam-soon (2011-2012, 2014-2015, acting director)
- CHUNG Hyung-min (2012-2015)
- Bartomeu Marí (2015-2018)
- PARK Wui-bin (2018-2019, acting director)
- YOUN Bum-mo (2019-2023)
- KIM Sung-hee (2023-)

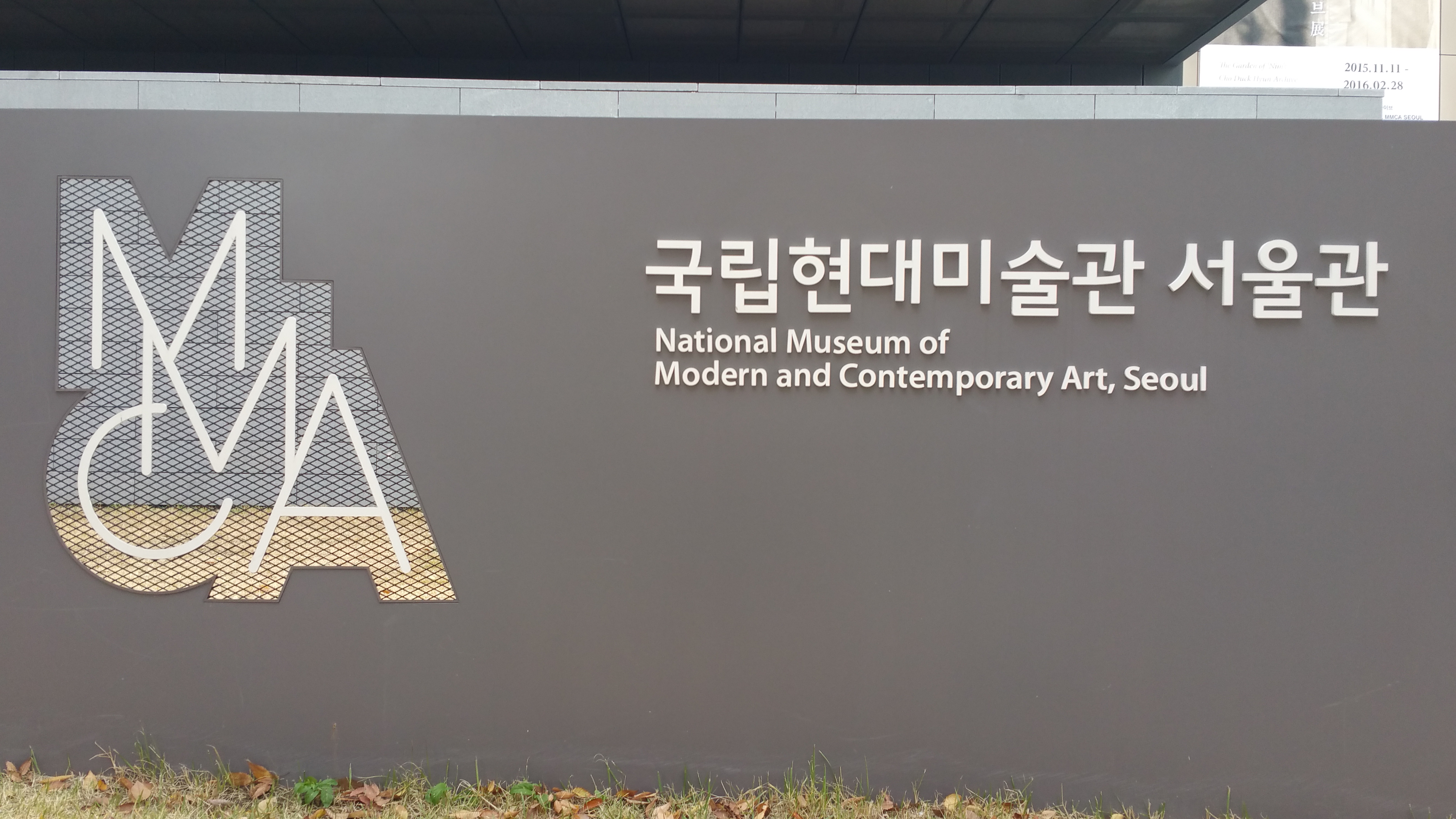
Seoul branch

== Controversies ==
Shortly after its opening, members of the Korean Fine Arts Association and other artist organizations protested over the selection of art for inclusion, charging the Director, a graduate of Seoul National University, with a bias toward graduates of that school, noting that 32 of the 39 artists represented in the exhibition Zeitgeist Korea are from his alma mater.

== See also ==
- List of museums in South Korea
- List of Korean painters
- List of largest art museums
- Korean painting
