= The Union Exhibition of Korean Young Artists =

The Union Exhibition of Korean Young Artists, sometimes called The Korean Young Artists Association Exhibition or Young Artists Coalition Exhibition, was an art show put by three Korean collectives: Zero Group (제로그룹/무동인 Jerogeurup/Mudongin), Origin (오리진 Orijin), and New Exhibition Group (신전동인 Sinjeondongin). Held from December 11–16, 1967 at the Central Public Information Hall, artists protested the stagnancy of traditional art institutions and they debuted Korea's first ever performance art.

This exhibition represented young artists' deep interest in new, contemporary art forms other than traditional painting and sculpture. While the public protests held during the show were eventually stopped by the police for questioning, the legacy of the show continued through the participant's continued staging of performances and the formation of the group Avant-Garde Association (AG): a group dedicated to advancing contemporary avant-garde activities and scholarship in Korea.

== Background ==
The artists involved in the Union Exhibition were young artists in their twenties, many of them recent graduates of leading art schools like Hongik University and Seoul National University. This generation of young artists were disappointed by the lack of innovation in the institutionalized Informel style of painting. Zero, Origin, and New Exhibition Group in their own unique ways addressed the rigidity of the established, government-sponsored art world and wanted to showcase innovative, contemporary art forms from the West that addressed socio-political issues. These groups were not sponsored by the government and therefore had the freedom to not abide by the tastes of the Korean elite, which were greatly influenced by the standards instituted by the colonial Japanese government. Zero, Origin, and New Exhibition Group felt that the Informel style was particularly self-indulgent and overly focused on the vacuous internal state of the artist rather than the issues of the industrial society being materialized around them.

Zero Group was founded in 1962 and focused on making object art assembled with ready-mades. They were influenced by anti-art practices and “environmental arts.” Members included Kim Youngnam, Kim Young-ja, Moon Bokcheol, Lee Taehyun, Choi Boonghyun, Hwang Ilji, Lee Dongbok, Seol Yeongjo, and Kim Sangyeound. These artists were also inspired by Neo Dada and Nouveau Realisme.

Origin, founded in 1963, was influenced by happenings in the West and Japan. Choi Myoung-young, Suh Seung-won, Suh Seung-won, and Lee Seung-jio are some of the notable artists who were members of the group. As opposed to Art Informel and Abstract Expressionism, Origin utilized geometric abstraction inspired in part by Dansaekhwa painters. This group claimed to be anti-informel and anti-Abstract Expressionism, and in their art they emphasized the flatness of the painting as a pure surface for geometric abstraction. Thus, their group name references their conception of the principal elements of painting, namely, the flat pictorial surface and geometric structures. Order, rules, anti-emotionality, and constraint starkly constrasted the expressive, unstructured features of Informel or Abstract Expressionism. The artists’ industrious use of the pictorial plane mirrored the proliferation of industrial infrastructure in urban life. Unlike the other two groups involved in the Union Exhibition, whom were invested in exploring non-traditional mediums, Origin was chiefly concerned with painting and abstraction.

New Exhibition Group was founded in 1967 and their chief interest was in exploring performance art. Similarly to Zero Group, New Exhibition group was interested in anti-painting, anti-abstraction, anti-art, and anti-flatness. They championed post-painting and post-materialist installations and performances.

== The Union Exhibition ==
The Union Exhibition was held at the Central Public Information Hall from December 11–16, 1967 with the intent to address social issues through various, so-called-by-the-established-art-community “experimental,” artistic media that was not yet accepted in the institutionalized art world, such as object art and performance art. Paintings were presented that escaped the trend of abstraction, with the exception of some sculptured by Origin which utilized geometric abstraction. In essence the exhibition was meant to be a convergence of art forms that opened the limits of expression and initiated a new beginning post-Informel. In a joint statement, the groups expressed that, “The Informel of the past 10 years has already given us nothing. “We are painters of action, and we aim for post-abstract works, works in daily life, and contemporary art that can be familiar to the public, “The Informel of the past 10 years has already given us nothing…We are painters of action, and we aim for post-abstract works, works in daily life, and contemporary art that can be familiar to the public.”

=== Artwork ===
On the opening day, Kang Kuk-jin presented the performance/installation entitled Colorful Plastic Bag wherein plastic tubes hanging from the ceiling dripped colored water that blended into each other mid-air. Kang Kuk-jin initiated the performance by swaying the tubes into motion, but he made it a point to show the uncontrollable, unstoppable nature of the tubes following his action. The limits of the human agent in this presentation makes an interesting commentary on the uncontrollable, erratic nature of creativity and expression. Due to the nature of paint mixing mid-air on the x, y, and z axes art historian Kim Mi-kyeong aptly described the piece as a “3-dimensional painting.”

On December 14, the third day of the exhibition, 10 artists from Zero and New Exhibition Group performed the piece Happening with a Vinyl Umbrella and Candle. Kim Yeong-ja sat in a chair and held a clear plastic umbrella above her head while the other 9 performers circled around her, walking carefully over Choi Bung-hyun's piece,Yeontong, which was situated nearby. As the performers circumnambulated they sang “Bird, Bird, Bluebird,” a song of mourning for the Donghak Revolution leader, Jeon Bong-joon, who was beheaded by the Japanese puppet government in Korea. Then participants used candles to melt holes in the umbrella as a metaphor for “pure consciousness” and human spirit to burn through the veil of “modern” civilization and technological advances such as the nuclear bomb. The umbrella was then tied to the chair Kim Yeong-ja was initially sitting on and the participants blew out the candles. The finale ended with the plastic getting torn off of the umbrella and someone screaming as the rest of the umbrella's structure was trampled. While the performance followed inspiration taken from a piece of writing by art critic Oh Kwang-su, it was also governed by Dada-ist notions of chance and unpredictability. The umbrella referenced the deathly cloud of a nuclear bomb while the Donghak song symbolized the enduring human spirit.

12 artists from Zero and New Exhibition Group took to the streets of Seoul in protest of academic art, the National Exhibition, and Informel art. They called themselves “acting” painters and artists, since they were free agents of creativity, not artists who blindly followed the status quo of what was deemed acceptable. The artists held picket signs with various statements such as:

“Joint statement by young artists on behalf of the Korean art community”

“Stagnant National Art Exhibition”

“Korea blind to contemporary art”

“Works after abstract art”

“Contemporary art is friends with the public”

“Free admission to our show”

“National Development begins with the active promotion of the arts”

“Artists who act”

First, the artists congregated in front of Seoul City Hall and then traveled to Sejong-ro, Chong-no 2-ga, Samil-ro, and Sogong-ro (all major areas of downtown Seoul) in order to get as much of the city public to see their action. Police eventually stopped the protest for questioning. While this was a legitimate protest, it was considered a performance piece by the participants and thus was named Street Protest.

=== Effects ===
The Union Exhibition was the first art show in Korea to call for the deconstruction of genre boundaries and for the acceptance of contemporary art. This collaboration amongst Zero, Origin and New Exhibition led to the formation of other collectives immediately following the show and stood as the initiation of performance art in Korea.

==== Young Artists Coalition ====
Zero and New Exhibition Group formed Korean Young Artists Coalition due to their similar interests in object art, installations, and happenings. Together they held academic events and lectures across the country that focused on the promotion of new art trends. The first seminar was held on November 15, 1967 and they started a lecture tour series on February 10, 1968. On May 2, 1968 the coalition organized an event called “Night of Contemporary Art and Happening.”

==== Korean Avant-Garde Association (AG) ====
In 1969, two years after the Union Exhibition, AG emerged to introduce avant-garde arts about Korea and abroad through magazine publications. AG's engagement with contemporary art was less radical than the Union Exhibition in that AG's publications focused on emerging trends in formalistic modernism (such as Nuveau Realism and Pop Art) rather than social criticism. The tie between AG and the Union Exhibition lies in the continuation of collaborations between the artists and the goa of building Korean acceptance of Western art. Kim Ku-lim was one of the leaders of the group that encouraged collaboration and experimentation amond the artists. While AG lasted until 1975, Kim Ku-lim formed The Fourth Group with Bang Tae-soo, Jung Kang-ja, Chung Chan-seung, and others to explore more radical performance engagements.

==== Experimental Art in Korea ====
The Union Exhibition debuted Korea's first experimental art exhibition to jump into reality and go beyond the canvas. Their rejection of the state-funded styles and modes of artistic presentation positioned art as an agent of social change. This show sent ripples through the subsequent groups that formed or presented performances, installations, and assemblages. New Exhibition Group, The Fourth Group, Space and Time (ST), Hyuck Collective, Daegu Contemporary and Arts Festival, are some of the manifestations of experimental art that emerged in the 1970s following the Union Exhibition.
