= Chung Chan-seung =

South Korean artist

- Hangul: 정찬승
- Hanja: 鄭燦勝
- RR: Jeong Chanseung
- MR: Chŏng Ch'ansŭng

Chung Chan-seung (Korean: 정찬승; Hanja: 鄭燦勝; 1942–1994), was a South Korean visual artist. He was also known as Chan S. Chung during his time in New York City.

== Early life and education ==
Chung was born in Seoul, Korea. He studied art in Hongik University's Department of Western Painting. In 1964, while he was still a student, Chung and some of his classmates formed the artist collective Non Col (논꼴, also romanized as Nonggol). Its members included Kang Kuk-jin (강국진, 1939–1992), Kim In-hwan (김인환, 1937–2011), Nam Young Hie (남영희, 1943–), Han Young Sup (한영섭, 1941–), Yang Cheolmo (양철모, 1943–), and Choi Taeshin (최태신, 1942–).

== Career ==
=== In Seoul, Korea: 1965–1980 ===
==== Non Col and The New Exhibition Group ====
Upon graduating from Hongik University in 1965, Chung and other Non Col members began presenting their work in annual group shows and publishing its own publication, Non Col Art (논꼴 아트). Due to changing interests between members, however, the collective disbanded just after its third annual group show in 1967. Chung and some other Non Col members, who became interested in going beyond the Korean Informel movement and its primary mode of painting, formed another collective the following year: the New Exhibition Group.

The New Exhibition Group or the Sinjeon Group (신전동인, Sinjeon Dongin), was established and run by artists including Chung, Kang Kuk-jin, Kim In-hwan, Shim Sunhee (심선희) and Yang Deoksu (양덕수). Along with the Zero Group and the Origin Fine Arts Association, the New Exhibition Group came to represent a new wave of young artists experimenting with non-traditional genres of art, especially through the Union Exhibition of Korean Young Artists they organized together in 1967. Celebrating the opening of the Union Exhibition, Chung and 16 other artists held a street demonstration as an open critique of the Korean art industry. The police arrested Chung during the protest, which marks the first of 40-some arrests to come while working in Korea.

==== Happenings ====
It has also been noted that Chung had participated in the performance Happening with Vinyl Umbrella and Candle, which took place during the Union Exhibition. Having taken place on December 14, 1967, the work is understood as the first "happening" to have taken place in Korea, a term popularized by artists to describe "spontaneously occurring incidents," "struggles to leave the world of art for the society around it," or "scenarios taking place within a designated place in real time." Understanding the potential of this type of performance as a public-friendly form of art that could engage in social commentary, Chung began to organize and produce his own happenings soon after.

Transparent Balloons and Nude was Chung's first happening organized with artists Kang Kuk-jin and Jung Kang-ja (정강자, 1942–2017), which took place on May 30, 1968, in the famed C'est Si Bon Music Hall in Myeong-dong, Seoul. The work presented Jung Kang-ja on the stage in the nude for over one hour and a half, during which the audience was invited to blow transparent balloons, attach them to Jung's body, then pop them. John Cage's music played during the event. Although Jung was not completely naked, Transparent Balloons and Nude has been considered Korea's first nude performance. Scholars have noted the work's significance for its strong feminist viewpoint and attempt to use a performer's body to challenge Korea's male-centric society and its gaze put upon a woman's body. The happening, based on Jung's memory and archived photographs, was reenacted and recorded to be spotlighted at the 2016 Busan Biennale.

Murder at the Han Riverside was the second collaborative performance organized by the same trio of artists. On October 17, 4 pm, Chung, Kang, and Jung gathered under the 2nd Han River Bridge (now Yanghwa Bridge), where they were buried in the ground and dumped with water. The three artists then climbed out of the ground and put on vinyl tunics, on which they wrote "cultural swindler (pseudo-artist) [문화 사기꾼 (사이비 작가)]," "culturally blind (culture phobic) [문화 실명자 (문화 공포증자)]," "culture shirker (idealist) [문화 기피자 (관념론자)]," "cultural fortune maker (pretend great master) [문화 부정축재자 (사이비 대가)]," "culture peddler (political artist) [문화 보따리장수 (정치 작가)]," and "cultural acrobat (artists jumping on the bandwagon) [문화 곡예사 (시대 편승자)]." The tunics were burned after the phrases were read out loud. The act was offered as a blunt and straightforward criticism of Korea's outmoded and conservative cultural establishments.

During this time, Chung also performed in the pioneering and experimental film work by artist Kim Kulim, The Meaning of 1/24 Second (1969). Among the fragmented and quickly changing images of Seoul's transforming and modernizing landscape, Chung is featured as a lone urban man, expressing his ennui while walking, yawning, and smoking. Such works led Chung, as well as Kang and Jung, to consolidate efforts with the artist Kim Ku-lim and others in forming the Korean avant-garde art collective, The Fourth Group (제4집단, Je Sa Jib-Dan). Although the collective lasted only a few months, their efforts significantly impacted Korean art by spearheading social and institutional critique through joint, body-oriented performances.

Chung became particularly well known for his individual fashion style and long hair during this time, a self-expression that he openly said to be everyday happenings that challenged strict and conservative notions imposed by society. During the 1970s, the authoritarian regime of Park Chung Hee imposed a law that allowed police scrutiny and punishment on men whose hair was longer than the allowed maximum length and women whose skirts were shorter than a certain minimum length. Chung performed two happenings in which he shaved off his own hair, once in 1970 and again in 1978. During the latter performance, Chung read a script he wrote celebrating the aesthetics of long hair, comparing it to one's own life that continued on, no matter how many times it would be cut. Such happenings thus served as an assertion of his own freedom and agency over his body and life.

Chung's focus on performance and using his own body as a medium for art also impacted his conceptual-based works, highlighted in Chung's Wood (목木, 1974~) series and his untitled woodblock print series (1978~). Wood was an installation work consisting of a row of birch wood panels leaning against the wall, which the artist shared its purpose lay in the artist's simple and repetitive labor in painting the panels with shoe polish. Chung's print series were made using small woodblocks, arranged in geometric compositions. The repetitive act of printing, especially with the woodblocks bearing the artist's knife marks, again highlighted Chung's interest in the work's making and relationship to his own body.

=== In Brooklyn, New York: 1982–1992 ===
In 1978, Chung was severely tortured by the Korean police and detained in a psychiatric hospital after being arrested for the usage of marijuana. This experience led Chung to seek to leave Korea. In 1980, Chung lived in Paris, France, following his participation in the 11th Paris Biennale. The following year, Chung was invited to participate in an exhibition that allowed him to travel to the US and settle in New York City. By 1983, Chung found his studio space in Greenpoint, Brooklyn with the help of artist Sung-ho Choi.

==== Junk Art ====
While Chung continued to perform happenings, such as creating chalk drawings in the park in the middle of the night for them to disappear after people walked over them throughout the day, most were not documented. He also departed from his previous conceptually-driven art-making practice and began to experiment with new materials, such as scrap metal and other found industrial materials. By tying these materials with string and connecting them to springs, wheels, or magnets, Chung was able to create a kind of kinetic sculpture that would move when prompted by its viewer. Calling his work "Junk Art", Chung aimed to enliven such waste materials and found objects and sought to explore the issue of the modernized society's marginalized and exploited people through art.

== Death ==
Chung returned to and died in Seoul, Korea in 1993 from rectal cancer.

== Exhibitions ==
- 1st Non Col Exhibition, Shinmunhoegwan (신문회관), Seoul, 1965.
- 2nd Non Col Exhibition, 1966.
- 3rd Non Col Exhibition, Busan, 1967.
- Union Exhibition of Korean Young Artists, Korea Information Center, 1967.
- Total Art Exhibition (종합미술전), Duksukung Exhibition Hall (덕수궁 구 종합전시장), Seoul, 1968.
- 11 Korean Young Artists, Solidaridad Gallery, Manila, Philippines, 1969. Participating artists: Kim Kulim, Kim Tchah-sup, Park Seo-bo, Suh Seung-Won, Youn Myeungro, Chun Sungwoo, Chung Chan-seung, Cho Yong-Ik, Ha Indoo, Ha Chong Hyun.
- The Exhibition of Korean Fine Arts Association (한국미술협회전), 1971.
- 1st Independent Exhibition (앙데팡당전 Angdaepangdangjeon), National Museum of Modern and Contemporary Art, 1972.
- 2nd Independent Exhibition (앙데팡당전 Angdaepangdangjeon), 1974.
- 3rd Independent Exhibition (앙데팡당전 Angdaepangdangjeon), 1975.
- Ecole de Seoul Exhibition, July 30–August 5, 1975.
- 9th International Biennial Exhibition of Prints, Tokyo, Japan, November, 1974. Participating Korean artists: Lee Ufan, Kim Kulim, Chung Chan-seung.
- 13th São Paulo Biennial, October–December, 1975.
- 1st Gwangju Contemporary Art Festival, Jeonil Museum of Art, Gwangju, 1976.
- 11th Biennale de Paris, September 15–October 21, 1980.
- Asian American International Video Festival, Danceteria, New York, 1984.
- Point Blank, Minor Injury, Brooklyn, New York, October 4–20, 1985.
- Ruins of Revolution, Minor Injury, Brooklyn, New York, February 9–March 2, 1986.
- Dialogues of Friendship, Minor Injury, Brooklyn, New York, July 12–August 4, 1991.
- Rebellion of Space: Korean Avant-guarde Art since 1967–1995, Seoul Museum of Art, 1995
- A Decade of Transition and Dynamics: Korean Contemporary Art from mid-1960s to mid-1970s, National Museum of Modern and Contemporary Art, Korea in Gwacheon, June 21–August 1, 2001.
- Performance Art of Korea, 1967–2007, National Museum of Modern and Contemporary Art, Korea in Seoul, August 24–October 18, 2007.
- Korean Rhapsody – A Montage of History and Memory, Leeum, Samsung Museum of Art, March 17–June 5, 2011.
- Coloring Time—An Exhibition from the Archive of Korean-American Artists, 1955–1989, Gallery Korea at the Korean Cultural Center New York, New York, April 10–May 17, 2013.
- Busan Biennale: Hybridizing Earth, Discussing Multitude, Busan Museum of Art, September 3–November 30, 2016
- The Oddball:, September 3–November 30, Remembering Chan S. Chung Through the Memories of His Friends, Gallery Korea at the Korean Cultural Center New York, New York, September 18–October 31, 2019.
