= Park Youngsook (photographer) =

South Korean photographer (1941–2025)

Park Youngsook (Korean: 박영숙, 1941–2025) was a South Korean feminist photographer known for her depictions of women. Park's most famous body of work is a collection of photographs from 1999-2005 titled The Mad Women Project (Michinnyeon Project, Korean: 미친년 프로젝트). This collection comprises eighty-seven staged photographs of women depicted in a variety of different ways that show their supposed inner "craziness" or "Mad Woman(ness)." Park is also among the first generation of feminist artists who emerged in the South Korean art scene in the 70s and 80s.

== Biography ==
Park Youngsook was born in 1941 in Cheonan, Korea, Empire of Japan (now South Korea) and died on October 6, 2025. In 1981, Park started university and then later graduated with a history degree from Sookmyung Women's University. Later, she got a graduate degree in Photography and Design from the Graduate School of Industry at the same university.

=== Contributions to feminist activism and the art scene ===
Park had been active in the South Korean feminist movement since the 1970s and was a part of the first generation of feminist photographers that emerged in South Korea. Park was asked to attend the Equality, Development, Peace exhibition, which was hosted by the Women's Coalition in commemoration of the 1975 International Women's Year created by the United Nations. In 1984, Park joined the feminist collective, Alternative Culture (Tto Hanaui Munhwa, Korean: 또 하나의 문화), which signified her active participation in the feminist movement. In 1988, Park, along with other artists from the collective, organized a feminist exhibition called Let's Open the Floodgate (Uri Bonmureul Teuja, Korean: 우리 봇물을 트자), which showcased photomontages that added to the wider discourse on body politics and women's liberation.

In 1992, Park joined the Women's Art Research Society (Yeoseong Misul Yeonguhoe, Korean: 여성미술연구회) and began trying to actively diversify the Minjung art scene, and took a leading role in the feminist movement. Park's works were considered marginal in both the Minjung art movement, where the dominant medium that artists worked in was painting, and the contemporary photography scene, due to the style and subject matter of her photographs, such as displaying the female body at the forefront of her work in a sometimes satirical way. The fact that she was a female photographer also most likely contributed to this state of marginality. She was also a photography consultant for the quarterly feminist magazine If (Infinite Feminist, I'm a Feminist), which featured Park's photomontage of a pregnant woman on the cover of its first issue. This photomontage came from Park's Song of Uterus project, which contained a series of photographs she had made for the 1994 exhibition, Women, Their Difference and Power (Yeoseong Geu Dareumgwa Him, Korean: 여성, 그 다름과 힘), which was held as the twelfth anniversary celebration of the feminist art museum, Hankuk Art Museum, founded in 1983. In 1998, Park founded the Korean Women Photographers' Association, which helped spread awareness of female artists as well as improve their rights. Park founded Trunk Gallery in 2006 and managed it from then until 2016 or 2019, which was Korea's first gallery solely dedicated to photography exhibitions.

== Work ==
=== The Mad Women Project ===
The Michinnyeon Project, otherwise referred to as The Mad Women Project, or, not faithful to the exact translation but captures the essence, The Crazy B*tch Project, is Park Youngsook's most well-known body of work. In Korean, Michinnyeon is a derogatory term reserved for women who are deemed to possess irredeemable qualities and are incapable of participating in life in a normal or desirable way, though, not actually true. This phrase is heavily steeped in patriarchal misogyny, and through her photographs of women, Park re-articulates the phrase, and her images say mockingly, "Haven't you heard? These are the presumed crazy women you've been talking about!"

This project is made up of eighty-seven staged photographs, from 1999 to 2005, depicting women, from various walks of life, in different settings and moods, surrounded by different props, all containing an overarching theme: "madness," or "she, who has gone mad." Some of her colleagues and feminist friends were among the women Park photographed for this series. These women performed moments of 'insanity' for the camera in response to and in protest of the social and patriarchal oppression that many women face. "Madness" here refers to a state of being, for women, that is either not considered acceptable or, in some ways, deviates from the presupposed path laid out for women, which usually contains heavy ties to the traditional, patriarchal views of what a woman's duty is.

The overarching Mad Women Project is made up of sub-categories, some of which include: The Mad Women Series (1999), Imprisoned Body, Wandering Spirit (2002), and Feminists in Tokyo (2004). Park uses various spaces, the most prominent being domestic interiors like the kitchen, a bathroom, or a bedroom, as backdrops in her photographs. One woman who is embodying a momentary state of madness is seen in a kitchen in the process of cutting some type of fish. The tips of her fingers are slightly covered in the residue of fish innards, and she is frozen in the moment before she cuts the next fish. She is seen gazing off in the distance at something out of the frame with an absent-minded look on her face, and in the hand that is raised to rub her face is a knife that is precariously close to her (Imprisoned Body, Wandering Spirit #1, 2002). In another photo, a woman is seen lying on her bed in her undergarments, bathing in sunlight while looking directly at the camera with a slight, comfortable smile on her face. Her bed is unmade, and her belongings are strewn around her in an organized chaos. She looks to be very content despite her surroundings being in a state of disarray (Feminists in Osaka #4, 2004).

=== Other collections and projects ===
Park's other works consist of Portraiture of 36 Friends (1981), Body and Sexuality (1998), Sexuality is Lost For Women (2001), Imprisoned Body, Wandering Spirit (2002), Project for Money Reformation (2003), Lesbian Wedding (2003), Monsieur Butterfly (2003), WOMAD, Goddess in the 21st Century (2004), Feminists in Osaka and Tokyo (2004), A Flower Shakes Her (2005), Witch Within Me (2005), and Tears of a Shadow (2019), among others.

=== Museums and exhibitions ===
Park's work has been exhibited in various museums such as the Seoul Museum of Art, the National Museum of Modern and Contemporary Art, the Hanmi Museum of Photography, the Gwangju Museum of Art, the Sungkok Art Museum, the Gyeonggi Museum of Modern Art, the Victoria & Albert Museum (UK), and in the ARARIO Collection. She was also asked to be a participant in the Gwanju Biennale in 2002. Park had a solo exhibition in 2016 at the Arario Gallery Cheonan. Various institutions, such as National Human Rights Commission of Korea, Ewha Women's University, and Sookmyung Women's University, also hold Park's works in their collections.
