= TV Star Meikan =

Japanese television personality directory

- Original title: TVスター名鑑
- Country: Japan
- Language: Japanese
- Publisher: Tokyo News Service
- Media type: Print

TV Star Meikan (TVスター名鑑, Terebi Sutā Meikan) is a Japanese television personality directory of Tokyo News Service, which launches in the autumn every year.

In this article, it will also describe Web-ban TV Star Meikan (Web版TVスター名鑑, Webu-ban Terebi Sutā Meikan) and its sister magazine Fresh Star Meikan (フレッシュスター名鑑, Furesshu Sutā Meikan).

== Overview ==
TV Star Meikan was first published in 1992. As commemorating the 30th anniversary of the launch of television information magazine TV Guide as an extra special issue (15 October Issue) it was issued (the front cover is TV Star Meikan, on the back cover is TV Guide Rinji Zōkan: Heisei 4-nen 10 tsuki 15-nichi-gō '92 Tv Star Meikan notated with adifferent title).

Initially it was combined with the publication year and title year, but the year of the title is set to the next fiscal year from TV Star Meikan '96 (temporary extra publication 25 October issue) issued in 1995. Until the 1999 edition, the publication dates are October, 2000, 2006 to 2006, November 2007. Regarding the form of issue, the extra publication of TV Star Meikan '98 TV Guide extra edition, TV Star Meikan 2000 'in 1999, TV Guide extra publication, 2000 TV Star Directory 2001 are books from the Tokyo News Mook Mook series.

Its book size format is A5 size, the basic colour in the cover is blue (2000 edition only, 2001 edition only dark blue) or purple land (after 2002 edition), the body magazine is monochrome. A celebrity directory booklet will be posted as an appendix to the usual TV Guide from about July every year, but those summarized are released in late October or early November. In addition to celebrities (individuals, groups, children), cultural people, news presenters, and announcers are posted. Athletes were also posted at the beginning of its first publication (Thereafter, there were also times when K-1 players were posted as male stars).

== Web-ban TV Star Meikan ==
In 2008, Web-ban TV Star Meikan has started as the website version of this directory. In addition, even the entertainer posted in the book version may not be posted on the web version due to circumstances of the rights. Also, some may not be published in the book version, some of the entertainers were posted only on the web version.

== Fresh Star Meikan ==
In its sister magazine there was the Fresh Star Meikan, a star map book of only young stars. It was launched in 1994 and it was released every March. Here the format is also A5 size. Female celebrities between 12 and 25 years old and male celebrities between 12 and 30 years old were eligible to be included (provided, however, that for groups the members were eligible for publication if they were even members).

It has not been issued since the 2008 edition, according to the news planning company, which is in charge of editing, it is undecided in the future and it is in fact a state of being suspended.
