= Korean Avant-Garde Association =

Korean artists collective, 1969–1975

Korean Avant-Garde Association (AG Group)
- 한국아방가르드협회
- Formation: 1969
- Dissolved: 1975

The Korean Avant-Garde Association (Korean: 한국아방가르드협회), better known as the AG Group, was a post-war collective of artists and critics in South Korea that practiced and advocated for the role of avant-garde art in and, thus, the advancement of contemporary Korean art. Between its establishment in 1969 and dissolution in 1975, the group organized three major, thematic group exhibitions and the 1974 Seoul Biennale, while publishing its own journal, AG. The association's members experimented across painting, sculpture, installation art, and performance art. The journal, driven by its members who were art critics, highlighted and discussed theories and trends in the visual arts on an international scale, which was one of the first attempts to do so in South Korea. Their organized and pioneering efforts have been noted as significant to the development of contemporary Korean art.

Members included artists Choi Myoung Young (최명영, 1941–), Ha Chong Hyun, Kim Dong Kyu (김동규, 1939–) Kim Kulim, Kim Han (김한, 1938–2008), Kim Tchah-sup, Kwak Hoon (곽훈, 1941–), Lee Kang-So (이강소, 1943–), Lee Kun-Yong (이건용, 1942–), Lee Seung Jio (이승조, 1941–1990), Lee Seung-taek (이승택, 1932–), Park Suk-Won (박석원, 1942–), Park Chongbae (박종배, 1935–), Shin Hak Chul (신학철, 1943–), Shim Moon-Seup (심문섭, 1942–), Suh Seung-Won (서승원, 1942–), as well as critics Lee Yil (이일, 1932–), Kim In-Hwan (김인환, 1937–2011), and O Kwang-su (오광수, 1938–).

== Background ==
The AG Group's foundation has been contextualized within South Korea's modern and contemporary art history following the various attempts of artists engaging in new and experimental modes of expression. More specifically, the AG Group was active during a period scholars had long overlooked for lack of a coherent, major art movement, caught between the preceding Korean Art Informel movement of the mid-1950s and following the Dansaekhwa painting and Minjung art movement of the mid-1970s.

The term avant-garde was introduced to Korea when the country began to embrace and accept Western art and culture at the turn of the twentieth century. Sinheung (신흥 新興) and Jeonwi (전위 前衛) had been terms employed during the 1920s to signal the most novel form of expression, generally understood as abstract painting, and later to the work in advocacy of certain social values, especially of the proletariat. Later post-war artists of the 1950s and 1960s embraced Art Informel and Abstract Expressionism protesting realist academicism and the feudalistic system of National Art Exhibitions (국전 gukjeon). Artist groups founded during this time were the Contemporary Artists Association (현대미술가협회 hyeondae misulga hyeopoe) and the 1960s Art Association (1960년미술협회 yooksimnyeon misul hyeopoe), which were later merged to become the group Actuel (악튜엘 aktyuel). As its leading artists integrated into teaching institutions and the Informel movement lost steam under the Third Republic of South Korea headed by president Park Chung Hee, another generation of artists emerged seeking out and exploring various possibilities of transitions. Small-sized artist collectives, such as Origin Society (오리진 orijin), Zero Group (제로그룹/무동인 jerogeurup/mudongin), and the New Exhibition Group (신전동인 sinjeondongin), began to experiment with genres gaining traction in the West, such as geometric abstraction, installation art, and performance art. In 1967, these artists came together to uphold the Young Artists Coalition Exhibition (also known as the Union Exhibition of Korean Young Artists or Combined Exhibition by Young Artists 청년작가연립전 cheongnyeonjakgayeollipjeon) as a push against the dominant National Art Exhibitions and the Informel Art movement. Their manifesto stated: “Informel didn’t provide anything for the last ten years. We are artists as activists who aim to create art after abstraction, art in everyday life, and public-friendly art.” op art, op art, geometric abstraction, sculpture, anti-art, and post-materialist performance was presented in the exhibition, which became a marker for the beginning of a Korean experimental art period. Performance art gained significant traction during this period, becoming increasingly suppressed going into the Fourth Republic and president Park's intensified military regime. Artists adopted this genre of art that could interject into everyday life and in public, especially in the form of happenings, to satirize conventional social values and culture in Korea. The Fourth Group (제4집단 jesajipdan), formed in 1967, began staging public happenings that led to debate and commotion within and outside of the Korean contemporary art scene.

In this lieu of advancing Korean experimental art, a group of artists formed the AG Group in 1969. While following the spirit of the Young Artists Coalition Exhibition but aiming for a more organized attempt, the group aimed to support its practice with critical theory and discourse. Thus the AG Group's activities began with publishing their own Journal AG in September 1969, a significant feat for a time when art-focused periodicals or magazines were nearly absent. Their efforts were united under the statement: “The AG has been established to contribute to the progress of Korean art and culture by exploring and creating a new plastic order in the visionless Korean art worlds on the basis of strong consciousness towards avant-garde art.”

== Exhibition History ==
The AG Group organized exhibitions under a singular theme, which is considered one of the first attempts to do so in Korea. The AG Group held four group exhibitions and one biennial between its founding and dissolution.

=== 1st AG Group Exhibition: Dynamics of Expansion and Reduction, 1970 ===
Held at the Central Public Information Center between May 1–7, 1970, the 1st AG Group Exhibition was titled after critic Lee Yil's landmark essay, “Dynamics of Expansion and Reduction (확장과 환원의 역학).” The 1970 issue of the AG Journal included a special section dedicated to the group exhibition, which was printed in time for the show to act as an accompanying catalog. Because the artists needed to submit information about their exhibiting works before the installation, there have been discrepancies between what was published and what was actually put on display. Most of the presented works responded to images of modernized urban environments, and many incorporated ephemeral and transient materials.

The 12 participating artists and their presented works were:

- Choi Myoung Young, Be Deteriorated 70-B (변질 70-B), 1970. The installation incorporated concrete pipes and cloths.
- Ha Chong Hyun, Work (작품), 1970. The installation work was built with x-ray images, mirrors, canvas, plywood, and lights, responding to frequent and temporal building and demolition in urbanization.
- Kim Han, Retrogression (역행), 1970. Influenced by a pop-art style, Kim painted images of offices, street lights, and roads with primary colors and straight lines.
- Kim Kulim, From Phenomenon to Traces (현상에서 흔적으로), 1970. While the AG Journal listed another work titled Traces (흔적) to have been showcased, scholars confirmed an installation work titled From Phenomenon to Traces. The work consisted of three blocks of ice put in separate boxes, with sheets of tracing paper on top, capturing the installation work's material (ice and water) and immaterial (time) components.
- Kim Tcha-sup, Ida, 1970. Kim's painting presented a dirt ground upon which objects–reminiscent of tools and waste materials disposed at construction sites–together compose a humanoid figure.
- Lee Seung Jio, Nucleus G-111A (핵 G-111A), 1970. Lee presented a geometric abstract painting from his Nucleus series. The repeated achromatic lines at varying shades seemed to render three-dimensional cylinders stacked together, offering a peculiar combination between a two-dimensional plane with a three-dimensional illusion. This marked the official debut of Lee's “pipes.”
- Lee Seung-taek, Untitled, 1970.
- Park Chongbae, Untitled, 1970.
- Park Suk-Won, Handle 707, 1970.
- Shin Hak Chul, You and Me (너와 나), 1970.
- Shim Moon-Seup, Point 70-1, 1970.
- Suh Seung-Won, Simultaneity 70-6 (동시성 70-6), 1970.

=== 2nd AG Group Exhibition: Réaliser et la Réalité (Reality and Realization), 1971 ===
The second group exhibition, Reality and Realization (현실과 실현), took place at the Gyeongbokgung Palace location of the National Museum of Modern and Contemporary Art in 1971. The group exhibition is particularly noted for having produced an early and rare instance of a post-exhibition catalog, including installation photos of all works in their temporal and site-specific final versions. Artist Lee Kangso described this exhibition to have been filled with works reflecting the status and time in which they lived. Artist Song Burnsoo designed the poster and admission tickets.

The 17 participating artists and their presented works were:

- Cho Sungmook, Red and White (적(赤) 과 백(白)), 1971.
- Choi Myoung Young, work from Be Deteriorated series (변질–극), 1971.
- Ha Chong Hyun, Counter-Phase, 1971.
- Kim Chung-Jung, Untitled, 1971.
- Kim Dong Kyu, Subsist 7117*7118*7119 (존속 7117*7118*7119), 1971.
- Kim Han, (전(轉), 전개(展開)), 1971.
- Kim Kurim, Medium (매개항 2), 1971.
- Lee Kang-So, Void (여백), 1971.
- Lee Kun-Yong, Bodyscape 71-12 (체 71-12), 1971.
- Lee Seung Jio, NucleusG 999-1 (핵G 999-1)
- Lee Seung-taek, Wind (바람), 1971.
- Park Chongbae, Untitled, 1971.
- Park Suk-Won, 71–적, A, 1971.
- Shim Moon-Seup, a work from Relations series (관계–합), 1971.
- Shin Hak Chul, 10:1, 1971.
- Song Burnsoo, Work-71 (작품–71)
- Suh Seung-Won, 14 works from his Simultaneity (동시성) series.

=== 3rd AG Group Exhibition: Trans-Ideal World 1972 ===
Source: (World Beyond Ideology),

The third exhibition, Trans-Ideal World (탈관념의 세계), also took place at the Gyeongbokgung Palace location of the National Museum of Modern and Contemporary Art in 1972. As written in Lee Yil's introductory text for the exhibition, installation-based, conceptual and process-based works were put at the forefront. Natural materials, such as wood, dirt, water, and stone, were often employed for installation works.

The 13 participating artists were:

- Choi Myoung Young
- Ha Chong Hyun, Untitled 73-1 (무제 73-1), 1972.
- Kim Dong Kyu
- Kim Han
- Kim Kurim
- Lee Kang-So
- Lee Kun-Yong, Relation (관계), 1972.
- Lee Seung Jio
- Park Chongbae
- Park Suk-Won
- Shin Hak Chul
- Shim Moon-Seup
- Suh Seung-Won

=== 1974 Seoul Biennale ===
The 1974 Seoul Biennale was the first Biennale organized in South Korea, with an aim to surface the younger generation's critical awareness of contemporary Korean art. It was ambitiously modeled after the Paris Biennial that ran as a platform to showcase the works of young artists, initially under the age of thirty-five. The 8th Paris Biennial of 1973 was particularly covered and discussed in Korea. The AG group originally conceived the Seoul Biennale to take place every 2 years, as explicit in its name, and serve as a platform for fostering long-term relations between Korean and foreign artists. However, no other iterations have been realized since its inauguration. Lee Yil acted as commissioner.

Apart from the AG Group's own members, 63 artists active in the avant-garde scene were invited to participate. Despite the Korean avant-garde scene's continued efforts in exploring various mediums of art, most of the works presented at the Biennale were "flat" that hung on walls. It has been argued that such an occurrence was a precursor to the Dansaekhwa painting movement.

=== 4th AG Group Exhibition, 1975 ===
Ha Chong Hyun, Kim Han, Shin Hak-Chul, and Lee Kunyong were the only four artists of the association that participated in the final exhibition, signaling the group's ultimate dissolution.

- Lee Kun-Yong, Logic of Place (장소의 논리), 1972.

=== Exhibition Catalogs ===
AG Group's efforts to accompany each of its shows with a catalog have been recognized as noteworthy, especially when a publishing system in the art scene was not yet fully established. Even so, recent scholarship has noted the difficulty in researching individual works showcased in the four exhibitions. For example, the first and third exhibition catalogs did not present an accurate checklist, as much of its information had to be gathered before the final form of installation. The catalog for the group's second exhibition, held in 1971, thus, serves as particularly significant historical documentation. As Korea's first post-exhibition catalog, it included installation photographs that capture the works in situ, in their final form.

== AG Journal ==
AG Group's journal, AG, was primarily led by critics Lee Yil, O Kwang-su, and Kim In-Hwan . While there had been artist groups such as Origin Society, Zero Group, and the New Exhibition Group that preceded AG's attempts to propagate experimental and avant-garde art, the AG Group's approach was set apart by its members centering their practices upon theoretical discourse in the journal format.

A total of four issues were published: the first issue was published in 1969, the second and third in 1970, and its fourth and final in 1971. Each issue balanced the amount of texts written between critics and artists. Such texts introduced contemporaneous art trends and major critical theories hailing from the West, particularly France and the US. This included discussion on land art, conceptual art, and experimental architecture such as that practiced by the British architectural group Archigram. The first page of each issue declared the AG Group's statement: “The AG has been established to contribute to the progress of Korean art and culture by exploring and creating a new plastic order in the visionless Korean art worlds on the basis of strong consciousness towards avant-garde art (전위 예술에의 강한 의식을 전제로 비젼 빈곤의 한국 화단에 새로운 조형질서를 모색 창조하여 한국 미술 문화 발전에 기여한다).”

The first 1969 issue was published prior to the group's first exhibition. It presented the names of the following members: artists Choi Myoung Young, Ha Chong Hyun, Kim Kulim, Kim Han, Kim Tchah-sup, Kwak Hoon, Lee Seung Jio, Park Suk Won, Park Chongbae, Suh Seung Won, critics Lee Yil and O Kwang-su, and journalist Lee Yil Hwa. The issue lists Ha Chong Hyun as the publisher and O Kwang-su as its editor. In Lee Yil's essay, “Avant-Garde Art Theory,” the critic explores the concept and role of avant-garde art by quoting French critic Pierre Restany: “Today's avant-garde is not an art of resistance, but an art of participation.”

== Critical Reception and Scholarship ==
Contemporary critics and many later scholars observed that the group and its activities lacked a clear objective of resistance to particular institutions or established art systems, which questioned the group's identification as avant-garde. Recent studies offer various reasons as to why the group seemed to steer away from responding to sociopolitical issues, including its elitist tendencies that gravitated toward their interests in intellectual and theoretical explorations of artistic issues. Scholar Sooran Choi, however, argues for a reconsideration of such apolitical characteristic to be in fact the group's “implied association with Western avant-garde art itself functioned as a form of subterfuge that protected them from censorship and persecution” since the anti-Communist, pro-American, authoritarian military regime aimed to rapidly industrialize and catch up to more developed countries in the global stage.

A universally agreed-upon significance of the AG Group is its organized efforts in backing its artistic practice by writing and publishing. Enabled by the group's membership between artists and critics and their close collaboration in publishing theoretical texts in the form of exhibition catalogs and journals. Inspired by the Paris Biennials, in which Korean artists began to participate in 1961, the AG Group also differentiated from other associations for its goal of creating a platform for young avant-garde and experimental artists at an international scale. Such efforts resulted in aiding the Korean contemporary art scene to include varied practices based on new concepts of artistic mediums and depart from uniform interests in painting, constricted between figurative and abstract art.
