= Tchah-Sup Kim =

Korean painter and printmaker (1940–2022)

- Hangul: 김차섭
- Hanja: 金次燮
- RR: Gim Chaseop
- MR: Kim Ch'asŏp

Tchah-Sup Kim (Korean: 김차섭; Hanja: 金次燮, 10 June 1940 – 28 August 2022) was a Korean painter and printmaker.

In 1990, Kim and his partner and artist Myong Hi Kim (1949–) bought an abandoned school building near Chuncheon, Gangwon Province in South Korea, as their studio space. Since then, the couple has worked between Korea and the US.

== Early life ==
Kim was born in Yamaguchi Prefecture, Japan, while his father worked on, most likely managed, the construction of an airfield for the Imperial Japanese Army Air Force near Nagoya. In the winter of 1944, Kim and his family fled Japan to Korea, traveling to his father's hometown, Angang near Gyeongju City in North Gyeongsang Province. By August 1945, Korea gained its independence from Japan. In 1950, the Korean War began, which led the family to flee from and return to Angang.

Kim began to take an interest in drawing and painting early in elementary school. Because art classes were not offered at the time when Kim attended middle school in Angang and high school in Gyeongju, he had largely taught himself art and was encouraged to study it in college by his teachers. Kim was accepted into Seoul National University in 1959 and graduated in 1963. In 1961 and 1962, Kim was awarded at the annually-held, government-hosted National Art Exhibition. After his time serving in the army, Kim did not have any thoughts of becoming a professional artist.Rather, he began to tutor and teach art at various middle and high schools in Seoul, including Ewha Girls’ High School.

== Career ==
=== In Korea ===
By the commission of artist Cho Yong-ik, Kim participated in the 5th Biennale de Paris in 1967. The triangle and sun motif, which Kim continued to pursue throughout his practice, begins to appear in his work.

In 1968, Kim and artist Hoon Kwak (1941–) formed a short-lived artist group, Painting 68 (회화 68). Members were mostly alumni of the Seoul National University's College of Fine Arts, such as Hee Ja Park (1946-), Bukang Yu (1943–), Jagyong Lee (1943–), Myunghi Cha (1947–), and Dongchul Ha (1942–2006). Kulim Kim (1936–) was another prominent member. The members each pursued their own innovative painting styles, including pop art, op art, and kinetic art, presenting them at the Sinmun Hoegwan Gallery. Kim showed a large painting titled Self-Portrait (1968), depicting five headless and limbless torsos, each connected to a different culture.

By 1969, Kim, Kulim Kim and others formed the AG Group. Short for the Korean Avant-Garde Association, the group sought out the role of the avant-garde in Korea's art scene. Its mission statement was published on its self-published, eponymously titled journal AG as: "The AG has been established to contribute to the progress of Korean art and culture by exploring and creating a new plastic order in the visionless Korean art worlds on the basis of strong consciousness towards avant-garde art." Members included artists such as Hoon Kwak, Seung-Won Suh (1942–), Myoungyoung Choi (1941–), and Chong Hyun Ha (1935–).

Kim's acquaintance with artist Kulim Kim also led to their collaborative work, Relics of Mass Media (1969). The work consisted of both artists mailing a series of three letters consecutively to 100 recipients over a period of three days. The first letter was sent out at 10:00 am on October 10 in a yellow envelope, which contained Kulim Kim's fingerprints and name written on a torn piece of paper. The second letter was sent the next day in a white envelope, inside with Tchah-sup Kim's fingerprints and name. The third and final letter contained a message from both artists that said, “You enjoyed the relics of mass media one day ago (귀하는 매스미디어의 유물을 1일 전에 감상하셨습니다).” The work is considered Korea's first example of mail art, but also an important example of performance art, relying upon not only the actions executed by the artists but also its participating audiences. The 100 people were artists, critics, and various other art-related cultural workers who were not given any prior notice. Kim wrote that Relics of Mass Media was an experimentation incorporating a social machine as an attempt to widen the parameters of a collaborative act of art. And scholars, such as Yeon Shim Chung, noted Relics of Mass Media to be the two artists' "critical response to Korean artists' neglect of electronic media and technology, the dematerialization of art and information technology as a medium."

In 1970, Kim participated in the International Biennial Exhibition of Prints in Tokyo. His submitted work, Composition B (1970), incorporates not only Kim's triangle motif but also fields of pebbles and stones, which continued to appear in his later etching works.

In 1971, Kim participated in the São Paulo Art Biennial with a sculptural installation work titled Situation-A (1971). Made near the Ehwa Girls’ High School, where Kim taught art, the work was composed of what seemed to be plain wooden planks set at an angle, upon which were smaller wooden rectangular and conical objects. The installation as a whole resembled Korean traditional pillories, thus alluding to the struggle between religion and pure mathematics or sciences.

In 1973, for Ehwa Girls’ High School's auditorium, Kim painted a mural depicting Yu Gwansun. The Korean independence activist organizer and symbolic figure tied to the March First Independence Movement was a student at Ehwa Girls’ High School. This was Kim's last work before relocating to New York, USA.

=== In the US ===
In 1974, Kim received a fellowship from the Rockefeller Foundation, which allowed him to relocate to New York City and study at Pratt Institute.

== Collections ==
Kim's works can be found in the following collections:

- The Museum of Modern Art, New York (https://www.moma.org/artists/3096)
- The Metropolitan Museum of Art, New York (https://www.metmuseum.org/art/collection/search/486660)
- Brooklyn Museum, New York (https://www.brooklynmuseum.org/opencollection/artists/5930/objects)
- The Harvard Art Museums, Boston (https://hvrd.art/o/175975)
- The National Museum of Modern and Contemporary Art, Korea
