= Jung Kang-ja =

South Korean visual artist

Jung Kang-ja (Korean: 정강자; 1942–2017) was a South Korean visual artist. She was involved in the Korean avant-garde art scene in its formative years of the 1960s and early 1970s, during the repressive regime of Park Chung Hee. In this time she staged and participated in performances that challenged the contemporaneous artistic and cultural norms in South Korea.

== Biography ==
Jung Kang-ja was born in Daegu in 1942. Jung graduated from the College of Fine Arts at Hongik University. Park Seo-bo, a leader in the Art Informel movement and Dansaekhwa, was Jung's teacher at Hongik University. He encouraged her to explore various forms of art such as Pop Art, soft sculptures, conceptual art, and performance. Jung took inspiration from foreign art movements by looking solely at the images in art magazines available at the library such as Art in America and Mizue. was a founding member of the Shinjeon Group, formed in 1967, a collective made up largely of peers from Hongik. She later took part in founding the Fourth Group. A solo exhibition of Jung's work was closed early in 1970, and around this time the Fourth Group disbanded. Afterward, Jung "felt that she was no longer able to pursue her career as an avant-garde female artist in Korea." In addition, due to the oppressive politics, scathing public opinion of her, and the incessant insinuations that she was a prostitute her avant-garde pursuit waned. She had also run a private art school, but lost her clients due to social backlash. In 1977 Jung married and moved to Singapore where she stayed for 5 years and started to use a local technique called batik in her art. From this point on she primarily explored paintings and 2-D works that expressed her inner subjective experiences through surreal, exotic landscapes and figures. She returned to Korea in 1982. Upon her return, though, she was entirely forgotten compared to the prestige her colleagues had accrued. In 1990, she went on a trip to 8 African countries including Egypt, Gambia, Niger, Kenya, Senegal, Sudan, Burkina Faso, Cote d'Ivoire, which heavily inspired her paintings. Shortly after that trip she also visited 6 countries in Southwest Asia: Thailand, India, Bangladesh, Nepal, Sri Lanka, Pakistan. She published her sketches from this trip entitled, "South Asia Illustrated Travel Document Series," in a magazine. In 2004, she went on another trip to the South Pacific that inspired the imagery of her paintings. It has been argued that Jung's place in the Korean avant-garde scene was downplayed in comparison to her male colleagues. Throughout her career she held 30 solo exhibitions but hardly received attention until her inclusion in the 2016 exhibition an/other avant-garde: China-Japan-Korea at the Busan Biennale. Jung died in 2017 shortly after being diagnosed with stage 3 renal cancer.

== Group activities and early work ==
Jung, along with other members of Shinjeon and later the Fourth Group, pioneered performance work in Korean art with what were called happenings (해프닝) after the style of the avant-garde in the United States. While she didn't label herself as a feminist, Jung used her body and identity as a woman to transgress the societal gender expectations for women of her time.

=== New Exhibition Group ===
The New Exhibition Group [신전동인 Sinjeondongin] which Jung was involved with explored performances and happenings. This group was founded in 1967.

==== Transparent Balloons and Nude ====
Transparent Balloons and Nude (1968) was put on by Shinjeon Group at the Young Artist's Coalition's 4th Contemporary Art Seminar entitled “Happening Show.” Chung Chan-Seung and Jung Kang-ja were the main authors of the piece. Chung Chan-seung had suggested the group to try Yves Klein's Nude Happening. This piece also held similarities to Yoko Ono's Cut Piece. The venue, C’est Si Bon music café in Suhrindong, was a famous place among young folk to watch singers perform. 350 audience members attended and were met with the music of John Cage playing on speakers and a tri-colored lighting system that flashed different colors. Jung came to the stage wearing white pants, a white shirt, and a white scarf. Once she sat on a chair, the male performers cut away all her clothes and left only her underwear. After that, the men blew-up clear balloons from a sticky adhesive plastic and then stuck them onto Jung's body. Once her body was totally engulfed in plastic balloons Chung Chan-seung, Kang Kuk-jin and some audience members pressed their bodies onto the balloons until they all popped or deflated, revealing Jung's body again. Silence followed the performance. Jung had been inspired to use the plastic adhesive balloons after watching children play with it. This was largely received by the media with shock, reflecting the conservative Neo-Confucian values of Korean society that Jung was defying. While the participatory aspect was meant to "pop" men's fantasies about the female body, the public reception seemed to only reinforce and double down on it. This time period was also shaped by government crack-downs on body politics such as the length of women's skirts and men's hair. She was negatively targeted by the press for her participation in Transparent Balloons and Nude (1968) which was the first semi-nude happening. This significant piece was later re-created in the 2016 an/other avant-garde Exhibition.

Initially, the group had agreed to hire a female model for the performance, but due to the shame associated with public nudity the model did not agree to participate. It's under this situation that Jung decided to step in. Also, Jung had the intentions of being completely nude for the performance, but the owners of C’est Si Bon asked the artists to hold back since the police officers were present at the time of the performance. Through this piece, Jung and the Shinjeon members were trying to present the body as higher in expressivity than any other art object and also complicate people's notions of artistic creation by presenting a temporal, participatory art. As opposed to the chaste image of the Korean woman's body which is never touched nor exposed, Jung's piece thrust the woman's body into the public eye. In the piece she is the artistic medium as well as the representative of all women, including herself as a subject. The press shamed Jung for her nudity and undermined the conceptual ideas the group had hoped to share.

==== Murder at the Han River ====
Murder at the Han River (1968) was an outdoor performance staged to criticize contradictions of commercialism and hegemony of the established culture. Kuk-jin Kang, Kang-ja Jung, and Chan-seung Jung buried themselves in a pit under 2nd Han River Bridge. The audience and the reporter poured water over them, and they climbed out of the pit, wet. Over their wet bodies, they wore vinyl covers, each written with words such as, "Culture Con-man" (Pseudo Artist), "Culture Blind man" (Culture-phony),"Culture Dodger" (Idealist), "Culture Illicit Fortune Maker" (Pseudo Master). "Culture Peddler" (Political Artist), and "Culture Acrobat (Period Hitchhiker). They read these messages out aloud and then they burned and buried them. Many who came to see this performance whispered, were anticipating Jung to take her clothes off and were disappointed when she didn't. The artists shouted "We want to kill them all!' at the end of the performance. Despite public ignorance, this performance was an expression of their urge to burn the old monotonous culturural system that gravitated around the corrupt National Art Exhibition, and to bring back the respectability to the Korean modern art.

=== The Union Exhibition of Young Korean Artists ===
Her work was included in the 1967 exhibition by The Union Exhibition of Korean Young Artists, which she took part in organizing.

==== Kiss Me ====
One of the pieces exhibited, Kiss Me, was an example of Jung's work challenging and resisting gender normalities in Korean society, a subject that appears across her artwork. Jung's mouth-shaped assemblage Kiss Me (1967) gained a lot of attention from the press. Within the “teeth” of the assemblage, Jung installed a red rubber glove, a mannequin's head, and other items. Plaster was used to build the shape of a woman's lips while thin wood was used to make tooth-shaped cubbies between the upper and lower lip. The red rubber glove represented the invisible housework labor women were relegated to do while the title of the piece provocatively contrasts that traditional role.

==== Happening with Vinyl Umbrella ====
On December 14, the third day of the exhibition, 10 artists from Zero and New Exhibition Group performed the piece Happening with a Vinyl Umbrella and Candle (1967). Kim Yeong-ja sat in a chair and held a clear plastic umbrella above her head while the other 9 performers circled around her, including Jung Kang-ja.

=== Jung Kang-ja's other "feminist" art ===
Even though she was not working directly with the women's movement in Korea, which was questioning the gender status quo in the 60s, her work challenged the gender politics defining Korean society. These works were not made in direct conjunction with or for other group activities that were happening at the time. During this time period, the heroic, masculine idea of "the artist" reinforced the idea that women's art was inferior to men's expression. Women artists, including Jung, underwent increased pressure from an ever-more critical eye from the art world and public. While some women avoided the topic of their gender in their work, Jung Kang-ja confronted the subject head-on with her keen awareness to the repressive gender politics of her time. Unfortunately, due to the limited perspective of the society, her work was received as a sexual object of voyeurism. Due to the harsh reception, the artist became traumatized and suffered from sociophobia.

==== The Murderer ====
The Murderer (1967) was an installation piece Jung made out of a mix of artistic mediums and domestic items: a Korean room partition that's been punctured to show a collage of a woman's shoes and legs. This sculptural scene illustrated a woman escaping the literal “frame” of gendered Korean customs that hindered women's sovereignty.

==== STOP ====
STOP (1968) was another piece that highlighted the tensions Jung felt upon her female identity. She depicted a woman draped over a bench with a ticking clock hunf around the chest and a heart icon inside a comically enlarged buttocks.

==== Women's Fountain ====
Women's Fountain (1969) also enlarged women's body parts that had been sexualized and controlled according to Korean men's desires and ideals of femininity.

==== Repressed ====
Suppressed (1968) was an installation piece that also pushed against gender inequality, but it did not receive any critical attention. This piece featured a human-sized iron pipe making a deep depression in a queen mattress-sized block of cotton batting. The heaviness of the phallic pipe created a valley in the plush cotton, which could create the metaphor for the oppressive male society that weighed down upon women's bodies and lives.

=== The Fourth Group ===
As a founding member of The Fourth Group, an experimental art collective, she participated in a number of their group artworks. Although not listed below, Jung was also going to collaborate with Kim Ku-lim and Chung Chan-seung on staging Nam June Paik's piece Sex on a Piano (1969). However, Myung-hee Cha participated instead since Jung was suffering from the condemnation from transparent Balloons and Nude.

==== The Meaning of One Twenty-fourth of a Second ====
She also participated in The Meaning of One Twenty-fourth of a Second (1969-1970). On the first day of the film's screening, which happened to be the day Apollo 11 landed on the moon, there were technical difficulties. Although the screening was canceled, Kim Ku-lim and Jung Kang-ja dressed up in tight white clothing and did a performance in front of 4 slide projectors that displayed images from the film.

==== Toilet Tissue Dress ====
1969 saw Toilet Tissue Dress, a collaboration with fellow Fourth Group member and fashion designer Sohn Il-gwang in which Sohn designed a dress made completely of toilet paper that Jung wore into a fountain.

==== Funeral of Culture and the Art Establishment ====
Jung participated in the Fourth Group's performance, The Funeral of Culture and the Art Establishment, in which the artists symbolically criticized their repressive society, and, indirectly, the authoritarian government, in which members of the group carried a coffin adorned with flowers to be buried, with the coffin and flowers representing "all contradictions" and "hypocrisy" respectively.

==== Muche Exhibition and solo piece ====
The Muche Exhibition put on by the Fourth Group was supposed to happen between August 20 and 24 of 1970. Jung's No Body [muche] solo piece was scheduled for the last day and aimed at showing her body/art not just as subject or object but rather as something that has no categorical boundaries. Her 1970 debut solo exhibition, titled Muche or Moo-Che (무체), was shut down by the government. According to a state employee, the early closure was due to the fact that members of the Fourth were seen as, "violators of social order." Muche, translated as incorporeality, was an idea influenced by Taoist thought that lay beneath the Fourth Group's work, being featured in their manifesto.

== Selected later works (1980s-2017) ==
After 1977 Jung focused on painting. Throughout the years her painting style transforms with her change in locations due to family and personal travel. Surreal landscapes, cultural motifs from the places she visits, and inspiration from Mexican muralists are among the elements and styles that can be seen in her work.

=== Demonstration against the Revitalising Reform ===
Demonstration against the Revitalising Reform (1973) was a painting by Jung that illustrated the collective and her own subjective frustrations with the government. Included in the dark, and roughly painted image were red banners that expressed civil discontent towards the oppressive Park Chung Hee regime.

=== Art Studio ===
In Art Studio (1977), Jung depicts herself painting and holding one of her children on her back while the other child plays on the ground. This showed her situation as an artist and mother who had to care for her art and children simultaneously, constantly juggling the impossible tasks of both motherhood and career.

=== The Room in Singapore ===
The Room in Singapore (1979) is an unsettling self portrait with the main subject looking frightened in a foreign interior. The business of the background and the scared facial expression showed her discomfort and inner conflict after her move from Korea to Singapore. She utilized a Singaporean fabric dying technique called batik to achieve a red canvas for her to paint on.

=== Night Blooming Flower ===
Night Blooming Flower (1988) portrays Jung sitting crouched with a brush and palette in her hands under the night sky. Due to her busy life as a tutor, mom, and housewife, her work was mainly relegated to the nighttime.

=== Title Unknown ===
Title Unknown (2001) is a painting that depicts a woman's lips, very similar to her assemblage piece, that are nailed shut and bleeding in a Dali-esque, surreal desert-scape. On the left there are 3 nude women figures and on the right side of the painting is a clothed woman on roller blades. Unspoken words and frustrations seem to characterize this depiction of a closed mouth as opposed to her Kiss Me piece that featured an open, smiling mouth with many items lodged within.

=== The Sahara ===
The Sahara (2011) was a massive mural painting inspired by her travels to Africa. A camel caravan is seen in the foreground while the makority of the space is filled with surreal sand dunes that look like pyramids. In the distance, the sun is depicted as a woman's eyes peering over the horizon.

=== Invited to My Funeral. 71 days since My Surgery ===
Invited to My Funeral. 71 days since My Surgery (2015) was Jung's meditation on death as she battled renal cancer. Made just 2 years before her death Jung depicted her own funeral.

== Selected exhibitions ==
=== Solo exhibitions ===
2023 Dear Dream, Fantasy, and Challenge, Arario Gallery, Seoul

2016 Special Exhibition for Celebrating the Book Publication -Jung Kangia; Dio, Live, Gallery H, Seoul

2015 The Death of Artists for the Happy Wall, Hongik Art Center, Seoul

Lonely Voyage, Seoho Gallery

2003 Big Brother Syndrome, Jongro, Seoul

Requiem 1919, Jongro, Seoul

1992-95 Published illustrations on The Sports Chosun newspaper

1988-92 Published The travel essay with pictures' on Hankookilbo newspaper

1979 Invited Exhibition at National Museum of Modern and Contemporary Art, Jakarta Indonesia

=== Group exhibitions ===
2016 Busan Biennale, which featured her work in the an/other avant-garde: China-Japan-Korea Exhibition

The 10th Namsong International Art Show, Seongnam Arts Center, Seongnam, Korea

2015 Commemorative Exhibition of the 70th Anniversary of Liberation: the Great Journey with the Citizens Uproarious. Heated, Inundated, National Museum ofModern and Contemporary Art, Seoul

2005-14 KIAF (Korean International Art Fair). Coex, Seoul

2008 Hamburg invitation exhibition, Hamburg. Germany
