= Lee Sung-keun =

South Korean artist

- Born: Seoul, South Korea
- Known for: Installation art

- Lee Sung-keun
- Hangul: 이성근
- RR: I Seonggeun
- MR: I Sŏnggŭn

Lee Sung-keun (Korean: 이성근 born 1954 in Seoul is a South Korean artist.

== Biography ==
Lee Sung-keun (pronounced: Lee Sung-Gun) was born in 1954 in Seoul where he currently lives and works.

He graduated from Hongik University, where he has been teaching fine arts in parallel to his personal practice and the consultation work he does for the National Museum of Modern and Contemporary Art of Korea.

== Artwork ==
His renowned Human+Love+Light mobile, composed of multi-coloured, cloud-like suspensions made from metallic threads and silicone, was shown on center-stage at the exhibition Korea now! at the Musée des Arts Décoratifs, Paris as part of France-Korea Year.

Building a bridge between man and nature, Lee's work is a perfect illustration of the concept of vital energy 气 (Qi), which is omnipresent in the artistic culture of Eastern Asia. He creates sculptures of primordial shapes that, at first sight, evoke human cells or the notion of fertility. Made out of entangled piano wires, which the artist sometimes brightens up with vivid colors; they establish a dialogue between fullness and emptiness while sustaining the resonance of their initial role. Once suspended in air, the vibrating play of light on the sculptures, and the apparent fusion with their surroundings into one symbiotic unity, bring the ovoid shapes to life. The inner core of Lee SungKeun's artworks can be resumed to their title: Human + Love + Light.

His exhibition at the Musée des Arts Décoratifs, Paris in a group show celebrated 120 years of friendship between France and Korea (Korea Now). His artworks are found in collections including those of the National Contemporary Museum of Korea and the Triennale of Milan, the latter via the Korean Embassy in Beijing.

== Selected solo art exhibitions ==
- 2015/ Henry Beguelin installation(Human+Love+Light) (Henry Beguelin, Seoul)
- 2013/ Mother & Child (Human+Love+Light) (Old Tobacco Processing Plant, Chungju)
- 2011/ Metal art installation (GT tower, Seoul)
- 2010/ Human+Nature+Light (Tornabuoni arte, Milano)
- 2009/ Human+Love+Light (Triennale Museum, Milano) 2009/ Human+Love+Nature (Hannover Messe, Hannover)
- 2008/ Human+Love+Light (LIH, seoul)
- 2008/ Human+Love+Light (Scola Gallery, Shanghai)
- 2008/ Human+Love+Light (T Gallery, Seoul)
- 2007/ Human+Love+Light (Euro Gallery, Seoul)
- 2007/ Human+Love+Nature (Mayo) (Korean Cultural Center, Beijing) 2006/ Human+Love+Light (The Korean Embassy, Beijing) 2006/ Human+Nature+Light (Gallery Artside, Seoul)
- 2006/ Human+Love+Light (space HaaM, Seoul)
- 2005/ Human+Love+Light (Space GAYA, Milano)
- 2004/ Human+Nature+Light (Euro Gallery, Seoul)
- 2003/ Human+Nature+Love (Baeksang Memorial Hall, Seoul)
- 2002/ Human+Love+Light (Baeksang Memorial Hall, Seoul)
- 2001/ Human+Nature+Love (Villa Romana Art Center, Florence)
- 2001/ Human+Love+Light (Baeksang Memorial Hall, Seoul)
- 2000/ God+Human+Love+Light (Baeksang Memorial Hall, Seoul) 2000/ God+Nature+Love+Light (Gibo Art Center, Rece) 1999/ Human+Love+Light (Centro D’Arte La Loggia, Florence) 1997/ God+Human+Nature+Love (Hoam Art Hall, Seoul) 1997/ God+Human+Nature+Love (Hoam Art Hall, Seoul)
- 1996/ the 7th solo exhibition (Yeroo Gallery, Jeonjoo)
- 1996/ the 6th solo exhibition (Posco Art Museum, Seoul)
- 1991/ the 3rd solo exhibition (Roho Gallery, Berlin)
- 1989/ the 2nd solo exhibition (Total Art Gallery, Toronto)
- 1988/ the 1st solo exhibition (Park, RyuSook Gallery, Seoul)

== Selected museum collections ==
- Triennale Museum (Milano, Italy)
- National Museum of Contemporary Art (Seoul) - Seoul Museum of Art (Seoul) - Hongik Univ. Contemporary Museum (Seoul)
- Posco Museum (Posco Co., Ltd. Seoul)
- McGuire Fine Art Center (Rhode Island)
- SSamzie Space (Seoul)
- GS Tower (Seoul)
