= Erased de Kooning Drawing =

Conceptual artwork by Robert Rauschenberg

- Artist: Robert Rauschenberg
- Year: 1953
- Medium: Traces of drawing media on paper with label and gilded frame
- Location: San Francisco Museum of Modern Art, San Francisco

Erased de Kooning Drawing is an early work of American artist Robert Rauschenberg, from 1953. This conceptual work presents an almost blank piece of paper in a gilded frame. It was created in 1953 when Rauschenberg erased a drawing he obtained from the abstract expressionist and Dutch-American artist Willem de Kooning. Rauschenberg's lover and fellow artist Jasper Johns later framed it in a gilded frame and added a written caption to mimic the framing style of the Royal Academy and monogramming found on Renaissance drawings and prints. The caption reads: "Erased de Kooning Drawing, Robert Rauschenberg, 1953" (see picture). It has been in the collection of the San Francisco Museum of Modern Art (SFMOMA) since 1998. SFMOMA describes the work as a "drawing [with] traces of drawing media on paper with a label and gilded frame."

Some consider Erased de Kooning Drawing a Neo-Dadaist conceptual artwork. Others argue that the action of erasing highlights his relationship to a group of artists known as "The American Action Painters", as codified by American critic Harold Rosenberg.

== History ==
The work comes after Rauschenberg's early monochrome White Paintings (1951). After this series of all-white canvases, Rauschenberg set out to discover whether an artwork could be produced entirely through erasure. He started by erasing his own drawings, but felt that the result was lacking, so he sought out a drawing by an established artist—clearly already a work of art—that he could erase.

He approached de Kooning, an artist he admired and who was at the height of his career, and asked for a drawing that he could erase to create a new work of art. De Kooning gave Rauschenberg a densely worked drawing that would be difficult for the younger artist to remove. Rauschenberg worked on the drawing for over a month using a variety of different erasers. The gilded frame and inscription by Jasper Johns have always been important parts of the work and were explicitly noted in 1976 to remain with the drawing in all exhibitions of the piece.

== Existing copies ==
No photographs exist of the de Kooning work before its erasure, but in 2010 digital images were made by SFMOMA, as a part of the Rauschenberg Research Project, that enhanced the remaining traces of the underlying drawing. De Kooning's original drawing features several figures facing in different directions, including at least one female, probably made with pencil and charcoal. Some marks may have been erased by de Kooning himself as part of the initial creation of the work.

The work, including its frame, measures 25.25 by 21.75 by 0.5 inches (64.1 cm × 55.2 cm × 1.3 cm). Some critics recognized the conceptual drive within Erased de Kooning Drawing, while others called the erasure an act of vandalism. De Kooning, however, gave Rauschenberg the drawing with full knowledge of the artist's intent. Without de Kooning's consent, this action could be more readily seen as vandalism. It was purchased by the SFMOMA in 1998 using a gift from Phyllis Wattis.

== Relationship to De Kooning and abstract expressionism ==
Despite partaking in two different art movements, Rauschenberg had known many of the Abstract Expressionists from his frequent visits to the Cedar Tavern in Greenwich Village. Rauschenberg decided to approach William De Kooning and ask him for a drawing which he could erase. Rauschenberg was prepared for De Kooning to refuse the request, which would have made the work a performance piece. After Rauschenberg explained the concept for the piece, De Kooning decided to grant his request and provided him with a drawing that De Kooning would "miss". In later years, Rauschenberg would continue to make pieces that explored his relationship to the Abstract Expressionist, action painting and De Kooning himself. His piece Automobile Tire Print, which involved applying ink to the bottom of tires and driving along a 21 foot piece of paper, is typically seen as an homage to De Kooning and his love of brush work and driving. Rauschenberg's pieces Factum I & Factum II explore the expressive mark making typically used by De Kooning and his colleagues. Factum I consists of mixed media and seemingly "random" marks and paint drips. Factum II is a calculated and painstaking recreation of Factum I. This could be read as Rauschenberg calling into question the authenticity of the Abstract Expressionists and their work.
