= Monochrome painting =

Paintings made with a single color

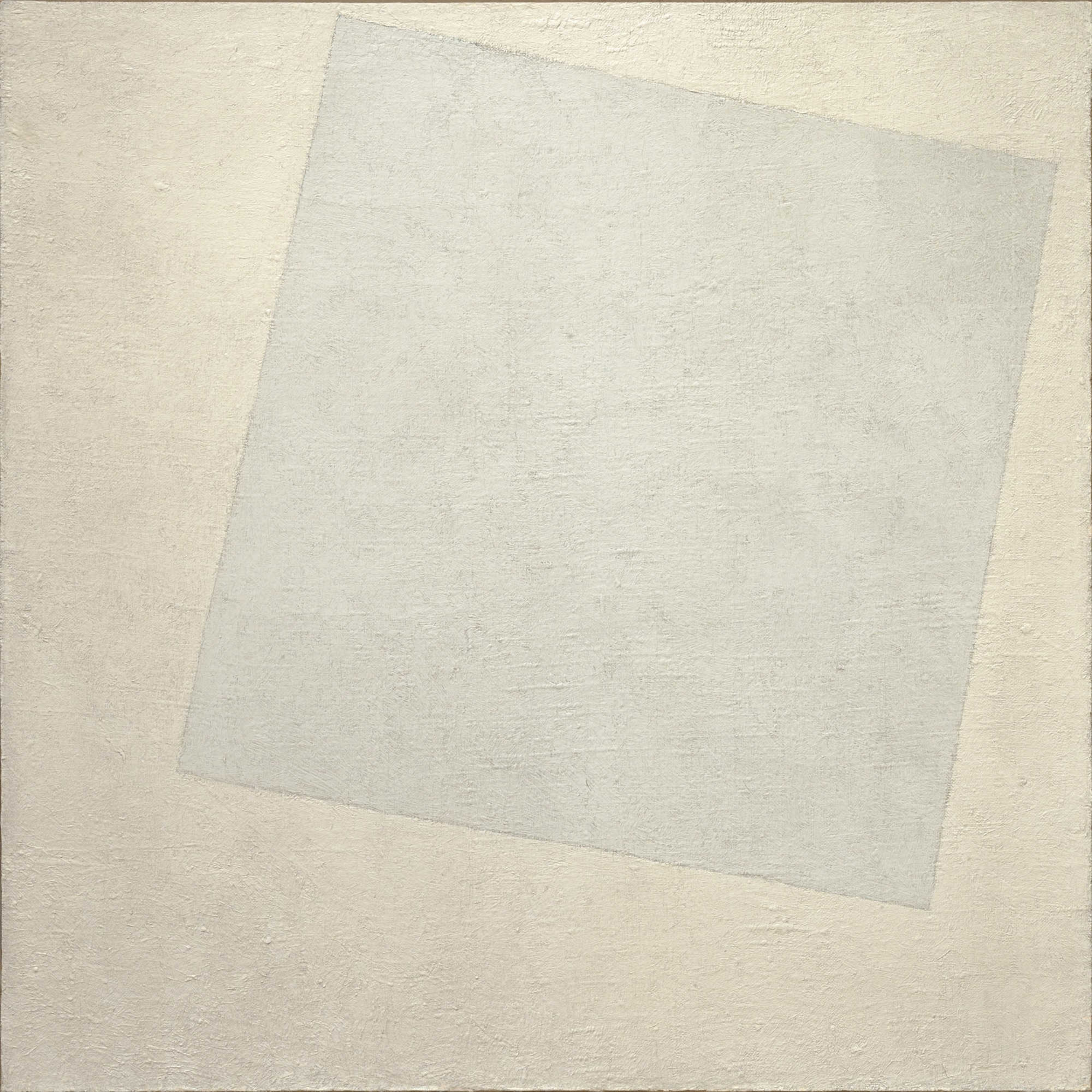
Kazimir Malevich, Suprematist Composition: White On White, 1918, Museum of Modern Art New York City

Monochromatic painting has played a crucial role in modern and contemporary Western visual art, originating with the early 20th-century European avant-gardes. Artists have explored the non-representational potential of a single color, investigating shifts in value, diversity of texture, and formal nuances as a means of emotional expression, visual investigation into the inherent properties of painting, as well as a starting point for conceptual works. Ranging from geometric abstraction in a variety of mediums to non-representational gestural painting, monochromatic works continue to be an important influence in contemporary art.

Monochrome paintings should not be confused with older styles of grisaille painting using only or mainly a single colour, typically black or grey.

== Origins ==
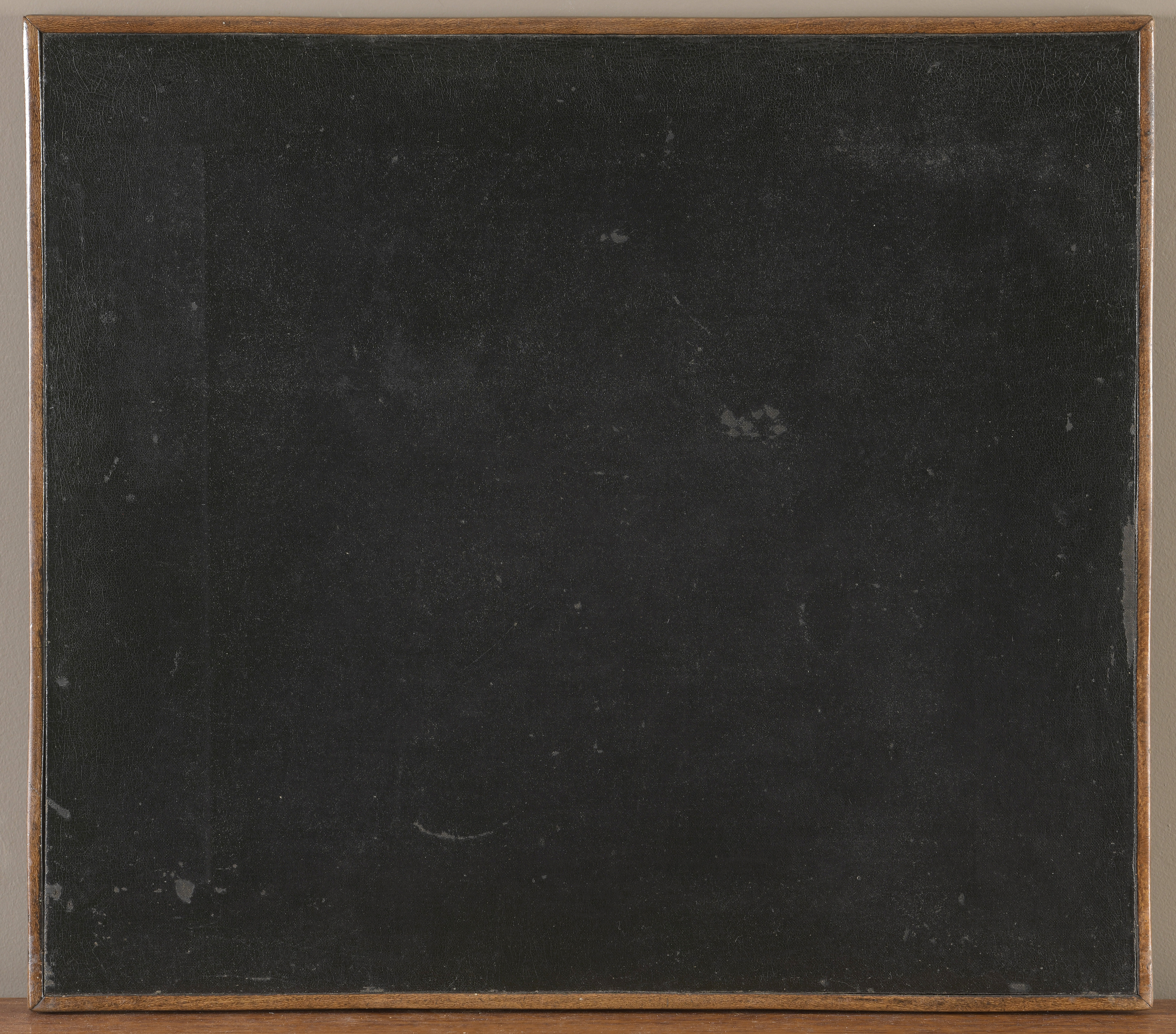
Paul Bilhaud, Combat de nègres pendant la nuit, 1882

Monochrome painting was initiated at the first Incoherents exhibition in Paris in 1882, with a black painting by the poet Paul Bilhaud entitled Combat de Nègres pendant la nuit ("Battle of negroes during the night"), which had been missing since 1882 when it was rediscovered in a private collection in 2017–2018. It has been classified as a National Treasure by the French state. Although Bilhaud was not the first to create an all-black artwork: for example, Robert Fludd published an image of Darkness in his 1617 book on the origin and structure of the cosmos; and Bertall published his black Vue de La Hogue (effet de nuit) in 1843. In the subsequent exhibitions of the Incoherent arts (also in the 1880s) the writer Alphonse Allais proposed other monochrome paintings, such as Première communion de jeunes filles chlorotiques par un temps de neige ("First communion of anaemic young girls in the snow", white), or Récolte de la tomate par des cardinaux apoplectiques au bord de la Mer Rouge ("Tomato harvesting by apoplectic cardinals on the shore of the Red Sea", red). Allais published his Album primo-avrilesque in 1897, a monograph with seven monochrome artworks. However, this kind of activity bears more similarity to 20th century Dada, or Neo-Dada, and particularly the works of the Fluxus group of the 1960s, than to 20th century monochrome painting since Malevich.

Jean Metzinger, following the Succès de scandale created from the Cubist showing at the 1911 Salon des Indépendants, in an interview with Cyril Berger published in Paris-Journal 29 May 1911, stated:

We cubists have only done our duty by creating a new rhythm for the benefit of humanity. Others will come after us who will do the same. What will they find? That is the tremendous secret of the future. Who knows if someday, a great painter, looking with scorn on the often brutal game of supposed colorists and taking the seven colors back to the primordial white unity that encompasses them all, will not exhibit completely white canvases, with nothing, absolutely nothing on them. (Jean Metzinger, 29 May 1911)

Metzinger's (then) audacious prediction that artists would take abstraction to its logical conclusion by vacating representational subject matter entirely and returning to what Metzinger calls the "primordial white unity", a "completely white canvas" would be realized two years later. The writer of a satirical manifesto entitled Manifeste de l'école amorphiste, published in Les Hommes du Jour (3 May 1913), may have had Metzinger's vision in mind when the author justified amorphism's blank canvases by claiming 'light is enough for us'. With perspective, writes art historian Jeffery S. Weiss, "Vers Amorphisme may be gibberish, but it was also enough of a foundational language to anticipate the extreme reductivist implications of non-objectivity".

In a broad and general sense, one finds European roots of minimalism in the geometric abstractions of painters associated with the Bauhaus, in the works of Kazimir Malevich, Piet Mondrian and other artists associated with the De Stijl movement, and the Russian Constructivist movement, and in the work of the Romanian sculptor Constantin Brâncuși. Minimal art is also inspired in part by the paintings of Barnett Newman, Ad Reinhardt, Josef Albers, and the works of artists as diverse as Pablo Picasso, Marcel Duchamp, Giorgio Morandi, and others. Minimalism was also a reaction against the painterly subjectivity of Abstract Expressionism that had been dominant in the New York School during the 1940s and 1950s.

The range of interpretation of monochrome paintings is one reason the monochrome remains relevant to artists, critics, and writers. Although the monochrome has not become a dominant style and few artists work with it exclusively, it continues to recur, often appearing during periods of aesthetic and sociopolitical changes.

=== Suprematism and Constructivism ===
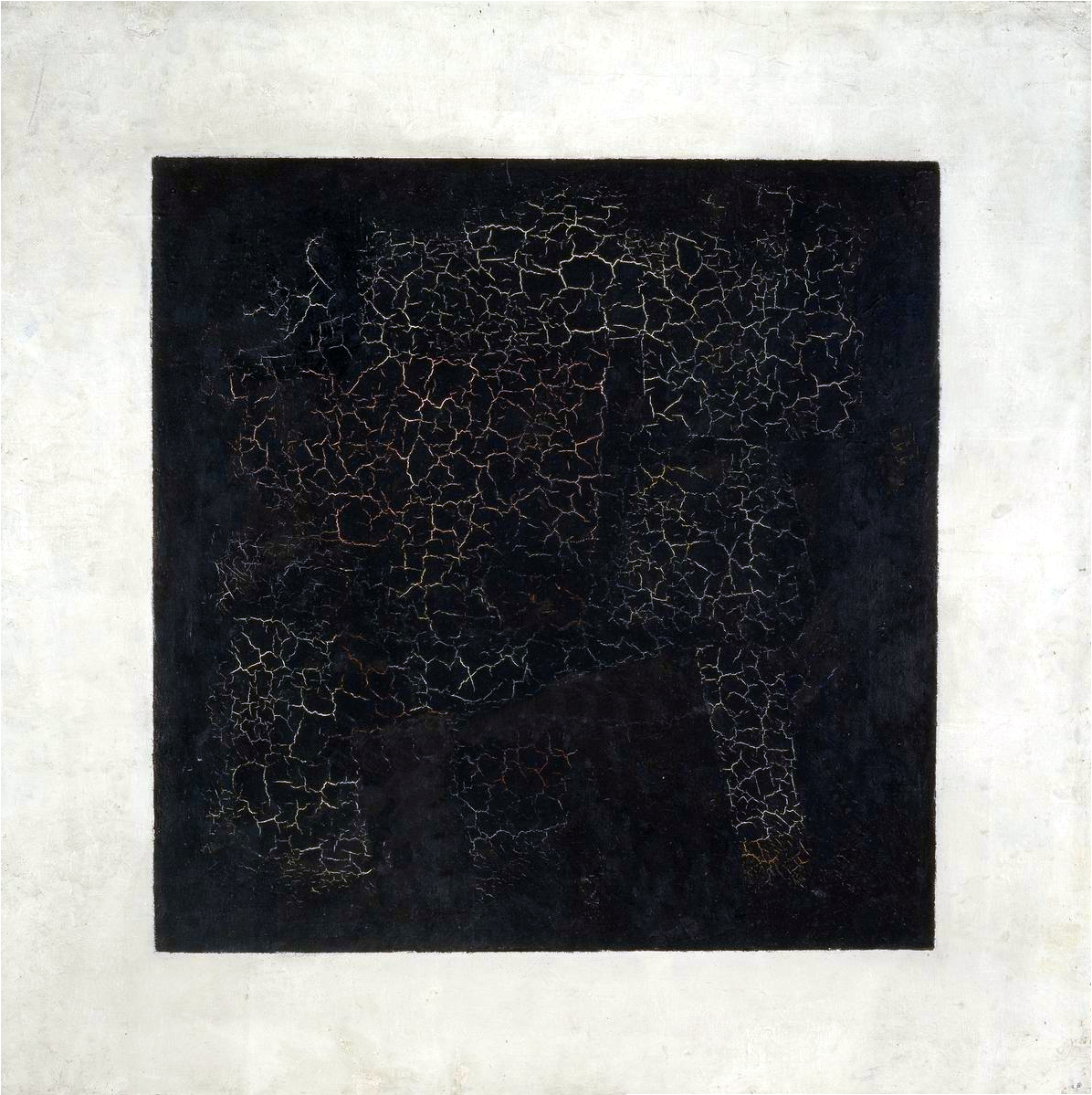
Kazimir Malevich, Black Square, 1915, oil on canvas, Tretyakov Gallery, Moscow

Monochrome painting as it is usually understood today began in Moscow, with Suprematist Composition: White on White of 1918 by Suprematist artist Kazimir Malevich. This was a variation on or sequel to his 1915 work Black Square on a White Field, a very important work in its own right to 20th century geometric abstraction.

In 1921, Constructivist artist Alexander Rodchenko exhibited Pure Red Color, Pure Blue Color, and Pure Yellow Color: three paintings together, each a monochrome of one of the three primary colors. He intended this work to represent the "death of painting." While Rodchenko intended his monochrome to be a dismantling of the typical assumptions of painting, Malevich saw his work as a concentration on them, a kind of meditation on art's essence (“pure feeling”).

These two approaches articulated very early on in its history this kind of work's almost paradoxical dynamic: that one can read a monochrome either as a flat surface (material entity or “painting as object”) which represents nothing but itself, and therefore representing an ending in the evolution of illusionism in painting (i.e. Rodchenko); or as a depiction of multidimensional (infinite) space, a fulfillment of illusionistic painting, representing a new evolution—a new beginning—in Western painting's history (Malevich). Additionally, many have pointed out that it may be difficult to deduce the artist's intentions from the painting itself, without referring to the artist's comment.

== Artists ==
=== Abstract Expressionists ===
- Milton Resnick had a long career as an abstract expressionist painter. Initially, during the 1940s, he explored the then-current style of action painting. His later work, from the 1950s through the 1970s is often characterized as abstract impressionist —largely because he constructed his allover compositions with multiple, repetitive, and close-valued brushstrokes, in the manner of Claude Monet in the famous Waterlilies series. During the final two and a half decades of his painting career Resnick's paintings became monochromatic, albeit with thickly brushed and layered surfaces.
- Ad Reinhardt was an abstract expressionist artist notable for painting nearly "pure" monochromes over a considerable span of time (roughly from 1952 to his death in 1967), in red or blue, and lastly and most (in)famously, in black. Like the Johns works mentioned below, Reinhardt's black paintings contained faint indications of geometrical shape, but the actual delineations are not readily visible until the viewer spends time with the work. This tends to encourage a state of contemplative meditation in the viewer, and to create uncertainty about perception; in terms of Frank Stella's famous quote, you may question whether "what you see" is actually what you are seeing.
- Richard Pousette-Dart created several distinct series of paintings during his long career as an abstract expressionist painter, his monochromatic series called Presences spanning the late 1950s through the early 1990s, was among his most powerful.

=== Color field ===
Beginning in the 1950s and 1960s, several abstract expressionist/color field artists (notably: Barnett Newman, Mark Rothko, Robert Motherwell, Adolph Gottlieb, Theodoros Stamos, Sam Francis, Ludwig Sander, Clyfford Still, Jules Olitski, and others) explored motifs that seemed to imply monochrome, employing broad, flat fields of colour in large scale pictures which proved highly influential to newer styles, such as post-painterly abstraction, lyrical abstraction, and minimalism.

One of Barnett Newman's near monochrome paintings generated outrage and widespread ridicule (and discussion) in Canada when the National Gallery purchased his 1967 painting Voice of Fire for $1.8 million in the 1980s. Another of Barnett Newman’s very sparse (though technically not monochrome) geometric abstractions was slashed with a knife by an enraged viewer in the 1980s at the Stedelijk Museum in Amsterdam.

=== Lyrical Abstraction ===
Lyrical abstractionist painters such as Ronald Davis, Larry Poons, Walter Darby Bannard, Dan Christensen, Larry Zox, Ronnie Landfield, Ralph Humphrey, David Budd, David R. Prentice, Brice Marden, David Diao, David Novros, Jake Berthot, and others also explored and worked on series of shaped and rectangular canvases that approached the monochrome—with variations especially during the 1960s and 1970s.

==== Shaped canvas ====
Since the 1960s artists as diverse as Frank Stella, Ellsworth Kelly, Ronald Davis, David Novros, Paul Mogensen, Patricia Johanson and others made monochrome paintings on various shaped canvases. While some of their monochromatic works related to minimalism none of the above were minimalists.

=== Neo-Dada ===
- Robert Rauschenberg: "A canvas is never empty". In the early 1950s, became known for white, then black, and eventually red monochrome canvases. In the White Paintings (1951) series, Rauschenberg applied everyday house paint with paint rollers to achieve smooth "blank" surfaces. White panels were exhibited alone or in modular groupings. The Black Paintings (1951–1953) incorporated texture under the painted surface by way of collaged newspaper that sometimes indicates a grid-like structure. The Red Paintings (1953–54) incorporate still more materials such as wood and fabric under the heavily worked painted surface, and seem to foreshadow Rauschenberg's development of assemblage in his "Combine Paintings" as well as his stated intention to act in "the gap" between "Art" and "Life".

The white canvases became associated with the work 4'33" by the composer John Cage, which consisted of three movements of silence, and was inspired at least in part by Cage's study of Zen Buddhism. In both works attention is drawn to elements of listening / viewing which lie outside the artist's control: e.g. the sounds of the concert environment, or the play of shadows and dust particles accumulating on the 'blank' canvas surfaces ("landing strips" – Cage).
In a related work, his Erased de Kooning Drawing of 1953, Rauschenberg erased a drawing by abstract expressionist artist Willem de Kooning. Perhaps surprisingly, De Kooning was sympathetic to Rauschenberg's aims and implicitly endorsed this experiment by providing the younger artist with one of his own drawings which was very densely worked, taking 2 months and many erasers for Rauschenberg to (incompletely) erase.

- Jasper Johns was a friend of Rauschenberg, and both were often categorized as Neo-Dadaist, pointing to their rejection of the Abstract Expressionist aesthetic which was dominant in the 1950s. Johns painted a number of works such as White Flag, Green Target, and Tango, in which there is only a slight indication of an image, resembling the White Square on a White Field of Malevich in technique.

These works often show more evidence of brushwork than is typically associated with monochrome painting. Many other works also approach monochrome, like the melancholic "grey" works of the early 1960s, but with real objects ("assemblage") or text added.

=== Minimalists ===
- Ellsworth Kelly spent a lot of time in both Paris and New York. Not strictly a minimalist, he has made a number of monochrome paintings on shaped canvases and single color rectangular panels. His abstractions were "abstracted" from nature. His interest in nature extends so far that he has made a series of plant lithographs in an impressive and sincerely realistic style.
- Mino Argento monotones, white on white paintings were variations on the gridded, rectangle on rectangle themes, but were enlivened with differences in rhythm and conception. One composition included grayed grids and vertical rectangles in several, more opaque whites, clustered centrally.
- Agnes Martin whose works of the 1950s and 1960s are serene meditations on "perfection", and hence "beauty", are typically white, off-white or pale grey canvases with faint evidence of pencil dragged in lines or grids across the painted surface.
- Robert Ryman in works such as Ledger (1982) purposely draws attention to supports, framing, and the artist's signature as important elements of works which are usually white, or off-white, and in square format. Abstract Expressionist brushwork is used as formal material in these minimalist constructions. Ryman exhibits a tour de force of variation on a deliberately limited theme.

Brice Marden, The Dylan Painting, 1966/1986, San Francisco Museum of Modern Art

- Brice Marden in his earliest mature works explored a reductive strategy which seemed similar to that of Jasper Johns's and Ellsworth Kelly's contemporaneous works, yet more formalist: paintings such as Return 1 consist of subtly grey fields painted in encaustic (wax-medium) with a narrow strip along the bottom of the canvas where Marden left bare evidence of process (i.e., drips and spatters of paint). During the late 1980s Brice Marden, who held a spiritual/emotional view of abstraction, began a more multi-colored and calligraphic form of abstract painting.
- Frank Stella echoed composer Igor Stravinsky's famous assertion that "music is powerless to express anything but itself" when he said "What you see is what you see", a remark he later qualified by saying his early paintings were influenced to a degree by the writing of Samuel Beckett (see above). In his work he was attempting to minimize any inference of "spiritual" or even "emotional" response on the part of the viewer, and this is perhaps most striking in his pinstripe beginning in the late 1950s, where the pinstripes are articulated by unpainted canvas. Later, Stella abandoned not only monochrome, but also eventually geometric painting.
- John McCracken is characteristically Minimalist in that his "objects" aren't adequately categorized as "painting" or "sculpture". Famous since 1965 for "slabs, columns, planks ... Neutral forms", his meticulously finished, polished monochrome objects are often simply leaned up against gallery walls, in what some critics describe as a casual "West Coast-lean". Although he draws from techniques characteristic of surfboard manufacture, his works are personally and meticulously handcrafted, unlike those of John M. Miller and other more recent artists, which are typically factory-made according to the artist's specifications.

Allan McCollum, Collection of One Hundred Plaster Surrogates, 1982/1990, Enamel on cast Hydrostone. Collection: Museum van Hedendaagse Kunst Antwerp, Belgium

- Allan McCollum determined in the mid-1970s that the social forces that give paintings meaning may be better understood if the "painting" itself could be reduced to a generic form—a painting that could read as a "sign" for a painting", which could function of a "placeholder", or a kind of "prop". In the 1970s and early 80s he painted what he called Surrogate Paintings, and ultimately began casting them in plaster, frame and all. These hundreds of objects that looked like framed, matted, fields of painted blackness, worked as neutral, "generic signs" that might inspire the viewer to think about the social expectations that constructed the "idea" of a painting, more than the actual painting itself. By reducing paintings to mere signs of themselves, McCollum turned the gallery and the museum setting into a kind of theater, highlighting the drama of presenting, displaying, buying and selling, exchanging, photographing, assessing, criticizing, choosing, and writing about the works; the object-paintings at the center of the action were purposely rendered moot, in order to turn one's attention to the supplementary devices and social practices that, in the end, bestow the value on the work. Paradoxically, as time went by, these neutral objects became valuable in themselves, as symbols of an anthropological way of looking at art.
- Anne Truitt was an American artist of the mid-20th century; she is associated with both minimalism and Color Field artists like Morris Louis and Kenneth Noland. Primarily thought of as a minimalist sculptor, and as a colorist who painted her sculpture, throughout her career Truitt produced several series of Monochromatic paintings.

She made what is considered her most important work in the early 1960s anticipating in many respects the work of minimalists like Donald Judd and Ellsworth Kelly. She was unlike the minimalists is some significant ways. She named, for instance, many of her works after places and events that were important to her—a practice suggesting a narrative beyond and yet somehow contained by the sculpture.
The sculpture that made her significant to the development of Minimalism were aggressively plain and painted structures, often large. The recessional platform under her sculpture raised them just enough off the ground that they appeared to float on a thin line of shadow. The boundary between sculpture and ground, between gravity and verticality, was made illusory. This formal ambivalence is mirrored by her insistence that color itself, contained a psychological vibration which when purified, as it is on a work of art, isolates the event it refers to as a thing rather than a feeling. The event becomes a work of art, a visual sensation delivered by color.

=== Europe ===
- Lucio Fontana started from 1949 the so-called Spatial Concept or slash series, consisting in holes or slashes on the surface of monochrome paintings, drawing a sign of what he named "an art for the Space Age" (Concetto spaziale (50-B.1), 1950, MNAM, Paris).

=== Monochrome works: The Blue Epoch ===
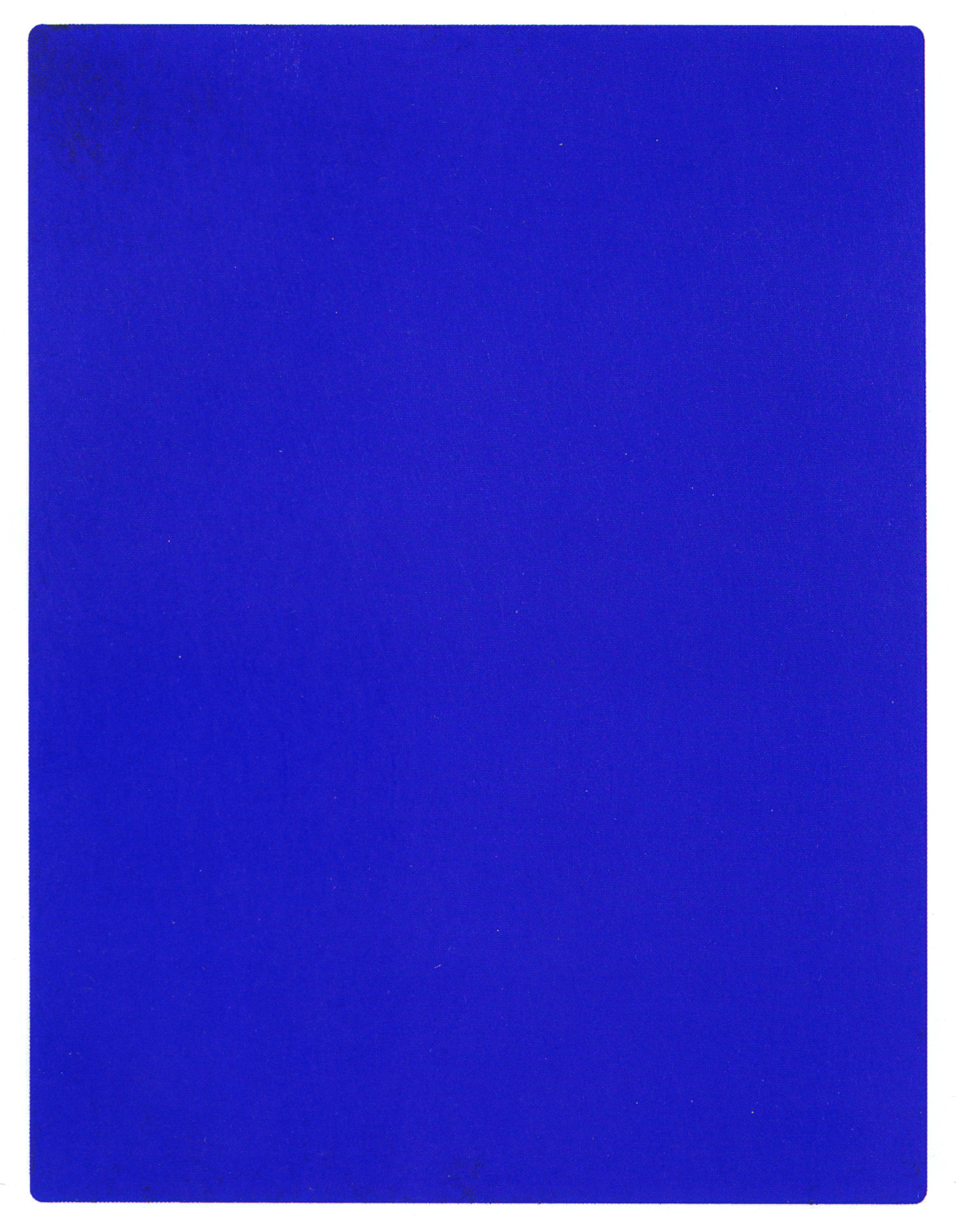
Yves Klein, IKB 191, 1962.

- Yves Klein: although Klein had painted monochromes as early as 1949, and held the first private exhibition of this work in 1950, his first public showing was the publication of the artist's book Yves: Peintures in November 1954. Parodying a traditional catalogue, the book featured a series of intense monochromes linked to various cities he had lived in during the previous years. Yves: Peintures anticipated his first two shows of oil paintings, at the Club des Solitaires, Paris, October 1955 and Yves: Proposition monochromes at Gallery Colette Allendy, February 1956. These shows, displaying orange, yellow, red, pink and blue monochromes, deeply disappointed Klein, as people went from painting to painting, linking them together as a sort of mosaic.

From the reactions of the audience, [Klein] realized that...viewers thought his various, uniformly colored canvases amounted to a new kind of bright, abstract interior decoration. Shocked at this misunderstanding, Klein knew a further and decisive step in the direction of monochrome art would have to be taken...From that time onwards he would concentrate on one single, primary color alone: blue.

— Hannah Weitemeier

The next exhibition, Proposte Monochrome, Epoca Blu (Proposition Monochrome; Blue Epoch) at the Gallery Apollinaire, Milan, (January 1957), featured 11 identical blue canvases, using ultramarine pigment suspended in a synthetic resin Rhodopas. Discovered with the help of Edouard Adam, a Parisian paint dealer, the effect was to retain the brilliance of the pigment which tended to become dull when suspended in linseed oil. Klein later patented this recipe to maintain the "authenticity of the pure idea". This colour, reminiscent of the lapis lazuli used to paint the Madonna's robes in medieval paintings, was to become famous as "International Klein Blue" (IKB). The paintings were attached to poles placed 20 cm away from the walls to increase their spatial ambiguities.

The show was a critical and commercial success, traveling to Paris, Düsseldorf and London. The Parisian exhibition, at the Iris Clert Gallery, May 1957, became a seminal happening; As well as 1001 blue balloons being released to mark the opening, blue postcards were sent out using IKB stamps that Klein had bribed the postal service to accept as legitimate. An exhibition of tubs of blue pigment and fire paintings was held concurrently at Gallery Collette Allendy.

- Gerhard Richter is an artist who is probably best known for his technically stunning photo-realist paintings, which overshadow his abstract and monochrome works. Both his abstract and representational works seem to cover similar emotional terrain, a kind of ironic pessimism which made his work very fashionable in the late 1980s. His grey paintings, are made by drawing "expressive" gestures in wet paint.
- Olivier Mosset also has spent considerable time in New York and Paris. In Paris in the 1960s he was a member of the BMPT group, along with Daniel Buren, Michel Parmentier, and Niele Toroni. The group brought forth questions about the notions of authorship and originality, implying that they often did each other's works, and that the art object was more important than its authorship. Later, in New York in the late 1970s, Mosset undertook a long series of monochrome paintings, during the heyday of Neo-expressionism. He became a founding member of the New York Radical Painting group, radical referring both to an implied radical social stance, as well as a returning to the radical "root" of painting. This re-assertion of social relevance for abstraction, and even the monochrome, hadn't been emphasized to such a degree since Malevich and Rodchenko. 1980s neo-geo artists such as Peter Halley who assert a socially relevant, critical role for geometric abstraction, cite Mosset as an influence.

=== Asia ===
Dansaekhwa (Korean: 단색화), is a style of South Korean "monochrome painting" beginning in the mid 1970s. Dansaekhwa artists often exhibited together, yet they were not part of an official artistic movement. Some artists associated with the style are: Cho Yong-ik, Chung Chang-sup, Chung Sang-Hwa, Ha Chong Hyun, Kim Tschang-yeul, Lee Dong-Youb, Lee Ufan, Park Seo-Bo, and Yun Hyong-keun.

=== Others ===
- Sally Hazelet Drummond (1924-2017, USA), exhibited her monochromatic paintings during the late 1950s in New York City at the Tanager Gallery, one of the first Tenth Street cooperative galleries.
- Alan Ebnother is an American painter who explores the heritage of momochrome painting, confining himself to the single color green.
- Florence Miller Pierce was a member of the TAOS Transcendental Painting Group in the 1930s, currently residing in Albuquerque, New Mexico. Her square monochromes, made with translucent resin poured onto mirrored plexiglass, seem to glow of their own accord.
- Blažej Baláž with his "double monochrom". Colour versus filings of coins, junk, soil or poppy seed. Painting Poppy Seed Field / Makové pole 2001/02.
- Marcia Hafif has exhibited monochrome paintings for over 50 in New York, Los Angeles, and Europe. She has created monochromatic works with oil, enamel, egg tempera, watercolor, glaze, acrylic, and ink. Her work was included in the 2014 biannual at the Hammer Museum where the artist exhibited 24 monochrome paintings, each one tinged with black.

== Monochrome painting in popular culture ==
- The 1998 Tony award winning Broadway play 'Art' employed a white monochrome painting as a prop to generate an argument about aesthetics which made up the bulk of the play.
- The 1995 Cesar award winning movie The Three Brothers featured a white monochrome painting by fictitious artist Whiteman (inspired by K. Malevich White on White masterpiece).

== Monochrome paintings most expensive sales ==
The following sales marked record prices for monochrome paintings:

1. K. Malevitch, White on White, 1918– MoMa, New York - sold for $60m in 2008
2. R. Ryman, Untitled oil on canvas, 1961 - sold for $15m in 2014

== See also ==
- Grisaille—a monochrome painting or underpainting within figurative art
- International Klein Blue

== Sources ==
- Tate Glossary on Monochrome
- Artnet page on Monochrome Painting
- Monochromes: From Malevich to the Present by Barbara Rose
- Berne, Terry (January 2005). "In the age of the monochrome". Art in America. 93 (1). Archived from the original on January 9, 2007 – via FindArticles.
- Geoffrey Dorfman pays tribute to Milton Resnick
