= Cho Yong-ik =

South Korean artist (1934–2023)

- Hangul: 조용익
- Hanja: 趙容翊
- RR: Jo Yongik
- MR: Cho Yongik

Cho Yong-ik (20 February 1934 – 2 July 2023) was a South Korean artist. He was a leading figure in Korean abstract painting along with Kim Tschang Yeul, Park Seo-bo, and Chung Sang-Hwa.

Cho was born in Pukchong County, South Hamgyong Province on 20 February 1934. He majored in art from Seoul National University and attended the Paris Biennale in 1961 and 1969 as one of Korea's delegates. His works are on exhibition in multiple museums, including the National Museum of Modern and Contemporary Art, the Leeum, Samsung Museum of Art, and the Ho-Am Art Museum.

Cho died on 2 July 2023, at the age of 89.

== Personal history ==
- 1960 Jury member of The Chosun Ilbo Contemporary Artists Exhibition
- 1958–1961 The chief of Contemporary Artists Association
- 1962 The chief of the Actuell Committee
- 1965–1968 Jury member of Young Art Prize
- 1965–1981 Invited Professor at Seorabeol Art College (Presently Chung-Ang University)
- 1967 The Chief of I.S.P.A.A. (International Society of Plastic and Audio – Visual Art)
- 1967–1969 5-6th Paris Biennale Korea Representative
- 1973–1979 Representative of Seoul '70
- 1974–1992 Professor at Chugye University for the Arts
- 1974–1981 23-30th National Art Exhibition of Korea, The Recommended & Invited Artist
- 1977–1983 Korean Fine Arts Association Vice Executive Director

== Solo exhibitions ==
- 1974 Shinsegae Gallery, Seoul
- 1984 Shinsegae Gallery, Seoul
- 1990 Arko Art Center, Seoul
- 2001 Jongno Gallery, Seoul
- 2008 Han Gallery, Seoul
- 2008 Geohong Gallery, Guri, Korea
- 2016 Sungkok Art Museum, Seoul
- 2016 Edouard Malingue Gallery, Hong Kong

== Selected group exhibitions ==
- 1961 The 2nd Biennale de Paris, Paris, France
- 1966 Contemporary Korean Painters Exhibition, Kuala Lumpur, Malaysia
- 1967 São Paulo Art Biennial, Sao-Paulo, Brazil
- 1980 Asia Contemporary Art Exhibition, Fukuoka Art Museum, Fukuoka, Japan
- 1983 Korea Contemporary Fine Art Exhibition, Viscontea Hall, Milano, Italy
- 2015 Re:Contemporary- Fermented Souls, Waterfall mansion, New York, USA
- 2016 Art Basel Hong Kong, Edouard Malingue Gallery, Hong kong

== Selected museum collections ==
- National Museum of Modern and Contemporary Art
- Gwangju National Museum
- Seoul Museum of Art
- Walkerhill Museum
- Samsung Museum of Art, Leeum

== See also ==
- Dansaekhwa
- Monochrome painting
- Abstract expressionism
