= The Fourth Group =

Korean art collective (1970–1971)

- 제4집단
- Formation: June 1970
- Dissolved: August 1970
- Type: Arts collective
- Headquarters: Seoul, South Korea

The Fourth Group (Korean: 제4집단) was a Korean avant-garde art collective that existed from June to August in 1970. Led by artist Kim Ku-lim, the group's membership was open to people hailing from diverse backgrounds. According to Kim Ku-lim, the reasoning behind the group's name was that, "By using the number 4, I attempted to break through conventions in the Korean art world as well as in Korean Society because this number carried negative nuances throughout our history."

Although the artists could not express openly their anti-government sentiments under the totalitarian Park Chung Hee regime, they produced consciousness-raising art with the goal of realizing a radical utopian vision of society through nonviolent change, a philosophy they described as 'muche'. Under the guise of parodying imported art ideas of the Western avant-garde, The Fourth Group was able to stage their politically charged artwork within an oppressive society.

The group's most notable performance was Funeral for Established Culture and Art, which was staged in 1970 on Korea's National Liberation Day.

== History ==
=== Foundation, June 1970 ===
The Fourth Group was in development since 1967, and its origin can be traced to the participation by future members in the Union Exhibition of Korean Young Artist Groups. The artists officially launched The Fourth Group on June 20, 1970, with an inaugural "establishment convention" at Sorim, a coffee shop in Euljiro, Seoul. To begin the event, the members placed their hands over their heart, sang the national anthem, recited the pledge of allegiance, and paid a silent tribute to patriotic martyrs. This was followed by a reading of their manifesto while soul music, psychedelic music, moktak (wooden percussion utilized by Buddhist monks), and sounds of nature played in the background. They played a Brahms symphony to mark the end of the convention and to symbolize the confluence of Eastern and Western thought present in their art.

=== Artistic ideas ===
The Fourth Group sought to encourage a sense of socio-political agency within the Korean public and to unify North and South Korea. The ideological framework underpinning the group's aims was called muche (Korean: 무체; Hanja: 無體; lit. 'incorporeality'), a term coined by the group's spokesperson Bang Tae-soo, and focused on a utopian vision of unity and transformation without violence. Muche was inspired by Lao Tzu's Daoist concept of wu wei (Korean: 무위; Hanja: 無爲; RR: muwi; lit. 'inexertion') under which people must be aware of their reality for change to occur. The two hanja of muche, 無體, can be translated literally as "without body."

Unlike other avant-garde artist groups at the time, The Fourth Group aimed to include experts from non-artistic disciplines and to cover all aspects of society, including art, religion, and politics. This inclusivity stemmed from their belief that art could no longer remain object-based and solely visual and that all disciplines should be unified as "total art." They sought to use art as a vehicle to think through and change all areas of life. Their performances included socio-political protests and institutional critiques to uncover the sinister realities of bodily control, suppression of the press, and other injustices present in Korean society.

The group used their performances to resist and reimagine what they considered the "misaligned body structure": a (Korean) body that bears the history of Japanese colonialism, the Korean War, and the pressures of the new Park Chung Hee regime.

==== Manifesto ====
The Fourth Group's manifesto "Declaration and Doctrine," which was announced at its inaugural convention, outlined their goals of fostering a new era of society guided by muche. With an emphasis on freedom of expression and communication, the group envisioned a complete revision of Korean society to return to Korea's "pure," "natural," and "unified" state. The phrase, "We were born on this land with a historical mission," borrows its exact language from the introduction of the Charter of National Education (which all Koreans had to recite, sometimes daily, during Park Chung Hee's regime). By referencing Park's famous words from December 1968, and using evocative language like "liberation" and "unity," The Fourth Group sought to subvert and destroy the existing political order that dominated Korean society with oppressive nationalism.

=== Performances ===
1969: Untitled, Performed in the Name of Environmental Art.

August 15, 1969: Toilet Tissue Dress (휴지의상). Staged at a fountain located in Jangchungdan Park in Seoul, avant-garde fashion designer Sohl Il-gwang collaborated with Jung Kang-ja to create a dress for her made completely out of toilet paper. With the dress draped over her nude body, Jung Kang-ja walked into the fountain and wet the entire garment. Upon stepping out of the fountain, the toilet paper was translucent and clung to her body. The duo were challenging fashion and gender norms by using unconventional materials and the artist's body.

July 1970: Street Mime Piece. In Myeong-dong, one of the busiest commercial districts of Seoul, Chung Chan-sung and Ko Ho wore placards around their necks that read: "With what do you prove your virginity?" and "Looking for myself, who lost his target income of 4,400 thousand won." The Fourth Group's name was at the bottom of each sign. The pair meandered through the crowded streets before Chong entered a store and stood in front of the display window. In front of the same shop, Ko began to consume wine and bread (referencing the Christian Eucharist, which was well known in Korea due to high rates of religious conversion). In response to Ko eating, Chong then began to lick the window pane vigorously. Chong's location inside the shop's display case rendered him a caged specimen that had to "perform" in order to receive food. The fact that the only sustenance he could toil for was the bread and wine, symbolizing the body and blood of Christ, spoke to the histories of missionary and colonial occupation that subjugated Korea to imported ideologies and bodily restraints. Most people passed by, but an onlooker who had seen this series of uncomfortable events, grabbed the bread from Ko and gave it to Chong. A second viewer, who was amused by Chong's desperate acts, dribbled water on the outside-facing part of the window.

August 15, 1970: Funeral Ceremony of the Established Art and Culture (기성문화예술의 장례식). Staged on Korea's Liberation Day, the performance involved a funeral procession that began at Sajik Park and ended at the Han River. In front of the statue of Confucian scholar Lee Yul-kok, they announced the independence of Korean culture and read from their "Declaration and Doctrine." The artists then carried a coffin filled with books containing "outdated political ideologies." Jung Kang-ja lead the procession holding a white flag (to symbolize harmony) and the national flag of South Korea. Kim Ku-lim also carried a white flag, while Chung Chan-seung and Son Il-kwang carried the coffin. Kang Kuk-jin trailed behind them with a shovel. This performance ended prematurely due to the intervention of the police.

August 20, 1970: Muche (Incorporeality) Exhibition. Planned to take place at the National Information Center August 20–24, the group prepared to host a seminar, a pantomime performance by Chung Chan-seung, and proclamation. It was shut down by the police on the first day.

=== Mail Art ===
Just before the group's founding, Kim Ku-lim and other artists executed a mail art piece on May 15, 1970. For this piece, Condom and Carbamine, the group prepared 201 envelopes, which were mailed to 20 art critics and handed out to 80 Seoul National University students in front of the school's College of Liberal Arts and Sciences. When the recipients opened the package, they found four separate bags with accompanying instructions that specified the times in which the bags were to be opened that night: 8:40, 8:50, 9:00, 9:05. Each bag (in the order they were to be opened) held white powder, a torn condom, a punctured sheet of paper, and instructions that directed as follows:

Open the first envelope on May 15 at 8:40 PM.

Upon opening this envelope, mix the powder with 20 milliliters of cold water. State your name three times, collect your mental self, and open the second envelope at 8:50 PM.

Put the condom on your genitals, and open the third envelope at 9:00 PM.

Breathe through the perforated sheet of paper four times, look towards the Nam Mountain for four seconds, and open the fourth envelope at 9:05 PM.

These seemingly eclectic objects and directions were rife with political meaning. As suggested by the title, the unlabeled white powder was actually carbamime: a gastrointestinal pain reliever from America that enjoyed brief popularity in Korea in 1962 before its import was halted due to negative effects on the Korean pharmaceutical industry. By directing participants to drink an indiscriminate powder and putting a condom on their bodies, the piece mimics the harrowing ways dictatorships can invade the most intimate realms of bodily autonomy.

The project took place on the nationally appointed "Day to Capture Rats," a program to distribute rodenticide (a white powder) to all citizens to use at a specifically designated time of the day. Due to this overlap, some participants wondered if the carbamime was rat poison. This rigorous rats extermination program not only exemplified the Park regime's fervor to erase all signs of underdevelopment, but it also spoke to a deeper colonial history where rats were used to represent state enemies.

=== Reception ===
The Fourth Group's ambitious ideals were not received well by the public, government, and the artistic community at the time. The group was antagonistic to the state of Korean society and the established art conventions in many ways. Above all, most of the members were new graduates from Hongik University or art-school dropouts (like Kim Ku-lim). Thus, they were viewed by the elite art communities as irrelevant novices. At that time, art ideals in Korea were dominated by Japanese and European canons and centered around developments in painting. State-run museums controlled the content and style of art that was shown through the Gukjeon (National Art Exhibition), which mirrored the earlier Japanese-run Seonjeon (Annual Korean Art Exhibition) in that it favored apolitical academic painting inspired by Japanese modernism.

=== Muche (Incorporeality) Exhibition and Dissolution, August 1970 ===
The Fourth Group's official activities as a collective culminated in their Incorporeality Exhibition, which was planned for August 20–24 at the National Information Center. Events prepared for the four-day event included a seminar, pantomime performance by Jung, and a proclamation. The group also planned to disorient the audience by darkening the room, making fog from dry ice, and blaring a loud siren. Before the exhibition could conclude its first day, it was shut down by authorities. All following attempts at staging events were undermined by the police and, after relentless government pressure, the group was forced to disband. Despite its short existence, The Fourth Group and its members were the first to explore performance art in Korea and would go on to inspire other contemporaneous art groups in Seoul, such as Space & Time Group.

== Politics ==
While The Fourth Group did not seek direct political participation, they structured their group like a political organization during a moment of intense political oppression. With the hope of future expansion, the group's members organized themselves into different branches and assigned duties. Kim Ku-lim was named tongryeong (president); Chung Chan-seung, chongryeong (secretary general); Bang Tae-soo, poryeong (spokesperson); and Son Il-kwang, uijang (chairman). Their activity and existence as an artist group can also be seen as antigovernmental as they formed at a political moment where assemblies and artistic activities were being oppressed in the lead up to the Yushin Regime that was in effect from 1972 to 1979.

As reflected in the group's manifesto, its formation was a response to the compounding traumas wrought by the Japanese occupation, the Korean War, and Park Chung Hee's dictatorship. Under Park's regime (1963–1979), Korean bodies were subject to long hours of labor, daily morning calisthenic drills, strict dress codes, and other tyrannies inducted by martial law.

Art was heavily controlled by the government's agenda and art informel paintings were promoted at the Gukjeon. The art informel movement was introduced to Korea by the United States Information Agency in the mid-1950s via traveling exhibitions and magazine publications and was positioned as a universal artistic language of freedom from communism that would liberate Korea from its colonial past and empower artists to join the international stage of art.

Although they avoided typical exhibition spaces controlled by the state in an effort to break down the walls between art and life, The Fourth Group's members were arrested on multiple occasions during their performances. Kim Ku-lim had his books confiscated and he and his family underwent interrogation at by the KCIA after the Funeral Ceremony of the Established Art and Culture. Due to the continual harassment and threat of arrest, Kim Ku-lim ended up feeling to Japan and Jung Chan-seung moved to the United States.

== Participants ==
- Kim Kulim
- Jung Kang-ja
- Chung Chan-seung
- Kang Kuk-jin
- Bang Tae-soo (theater director)
- Son Il-kwang (fashion designer)
- Ko Ho (Pantomime artist)
- Lee Ik-tae (film director)
- Lim Joong-woon (scriptwriter)
- Kim Bul-rae (sound engineer)
- Seok Ya-jeong (seal engraver)
- Lee Ja-kyung (journalist)
- Suk Ya-jeong (monk)
