= Ha Chong Hyun =

South Korean painter (born 1935)

Ha Chong Hyun (Korean: 하종현; born 1935) or Ha Chong-hyun is a South Korean artist. Today, through his Conjunction series (1974–present), Ha is best known as a leading practitioner of the Korean monochrome art trend known as Dansaekhwa. However, the arc of Ha's practice from the 1960s to the present is more fundamentally characterized by his wide explorations of materiality and ways of challenging the conventions of art making.

In his early artistic experiments across the two decades following the end of the Korean War, Ha moved between abstract painting and installations as he at once demonstrated his engagement with a broad array of materials and pursued hybridity across artistic categories, while arguably reflecting upon South Korea's contemporaneous urban transformation. Whereas his experiments with what is conventionally characterized as gestural and geometric abstraction served as a preparatory ground for his engagement with materiality, his involvement with the art group AG (est. 1969) led him to further explore materiality through non-painterly mediums, spanning sculpture and installations. In 1974, he began to focus solely upon painting as he began his Conjunction series.

Ha's oeuvre has been a subject of frequent critical and art-historical studies. His works have often been contextualized within exhibitions and writings on Dansaekhwa, but his early experimentalism forms a vital part of 1960s and 1970s art in Korea.

== Biography ==
Ha Chong Hyun was born in Sancheong, Keishōnan-dō (South Gyeongsang Province), Korea, Empire of Japan in 1935, and he spent part of his childhood in Japan in Moji (now part of Kitakyushu, Fukuoka Prefecture). After Korea's independence in 1945, Ha returned to Korea.

In 1959, he received his undergraduate degree from the Department of Painting at Hongik University. His teachers at Hongik University included Kim Whanki and Yoo Yongkuk. Ha served as a professor at his alma mater for over 30 years, and he was Dean of the College of Fine Arts from 1990 to 1994. Ha was awarded an honorary doctorate from the same institution in 2000.

Across his artistic career, Ha has served as a representative of and leader within Korea's art scene. His early artworks were presented in the Paris Youth Biennale in 1967, the Paris Biennale in 1965 and 1971, the São Paulo Biennial in 1967 and 1977, and the Triennale India in 1975. In 1969, Ha became a founding member and Chairman of the Korea Avant-Garde Association (AG, active 1969–1975). As a member of AG, he participated in the four AG exhibitions with artworks such as installations and barbed wire on panel. He also participated in the Seoul Biennale (organized by AG in 1974) and contributed to the AG journal. He served as President of the Korea Art Association (1986–1989), Commissioner of the 43rd Venice Biennale (1988), and Director of the Seoul Museum of Art (2001–2006).

Ha currently lives and works in Seoul.

== Notable artworks ==
=== Early experiments: 1960–1968 ===
Ha's paintings following his graduation from college initially pursued gestural abstraction, combining thickly layered, somber-hued oil paint with collaged elements on canvas. Works dating between 1962 and 1965 indicate Ha's layering broad brushstrokes as well as his manipulation of the wet paint to inscribe gestures or incisions upon it, or embrace its liquid quality as it dripped down the canvas. For works made in 1962 and 1963, Ha's final act was to burn the painting's surface with flame. Two works from 1965 demonstrate Ha's choice to lacerate the canvas, perturbing its paint-covered fibers and exposing their individual threads. Ha participated in the 1965 Paris Biennale with one such work.

Ha's Naissance series, made beginning in 1967, carried forward a lacerating technique to meet mat-like woven areas of canvas and obangsaek hued-paints within the context of geometric compositions. In the same year, Ha took up similar geometries and color palette for his White Paper on Urban Planning series (1967–c. 1969), paintings of oil on canvas, a first of which possesses a lower half that was folded into accordion-like pleats. Notably, in the White Paper on Urban Planning series, the art historians Kyung An and Yeon Shim Chung have found multiple layers of allusions to the rapidly transforming Seoul of the late 1960s, from the dancheong patterns of the ancient Korean architecture (then becoming recognized and conserved as national heritage) to discussions of urbanization playing out on the pages of Space magazine.

Scholars and critics have variously interpreted the arc of these early paintings. Many echo the critic Lee Yil, an early champion of Ha's work, in dividing Ha's work in the mid-sixties with the terms Informel painting and then geometric abstraction (which Lee connected to Constructivism and for which several others have appealed to the term Op art). While some art historians argue that Ha attempted to extend his painting beyond two-dimensionality, into the spaces of sculpture and even architecture, the art historian Kim Mikyung went so far as to call for an interpretation of Ha's early work that looks beyond the terms and categories of Euro-American modernism: "Regarding his transition in the space of one year from 1965, critiques training up from Western traditions might put it as a sharp turn from Informel tendencies towards geometric form and distribution or Op art…." Instead, Kim finds Ha's work before and after 1965 to have continuity—in her words, "to reveal as it does characteristically, the material, to accentuate the properties of matter." Indeed, in an essay for Ha's first solo exhibition in Seoul in 1974, Lee Yil ultimately found that "an awareness to material receptivity," from which "material takes on a life of its own," fundamentally characterizes Ha's early work.

=== The AG years: 1969–1975 ===
In addition to serving as the chairman of the AG group and contributing to the AG journal, Ha Chong Hyun was one of the few artists to participate in all five of the exhibitions that AG organized. For the works he presented in the AG exhibitions, Ha abandoned the brush to experiment with juxtaposing other materials and objects in ways that, as the curator Yoon Jin Sup has described them, emphasized contrast. In the second AG exhibition in 1971, Ha presented Counter-Phase (1971), which juxtaposed two stacks of newspaper—one with news printed on it, the other blank. The next year, Ha turned to making works of wire springs on panel. Ha's Work 72(B) (1972), shown in the third AG exhibition, consists of springs that extend horizontal from the left and right sides of pictorial plane, then meet in the middle and spill forward in a mane-like mass. During this time, Ha also began working with barbed wire, wrapping it around stretched canvas or dismantling it into individual barbs with which he punctured the canvas repeatedly.

Consistently, scholars, curators, and critics have addressed the complexity of the above artworks' relationship to the political atmosphere and increased policing of free speech during the Park Chung Hee regime. Whereas some have considered these works to explicitly make political statements, others have specified that connections to their contemporaneous political context reside on a more latent level. In particular, the art historians Kim Mikyung and Joan Kee have proposed that, respectively, the repressive atmosphere of and ubiquity of military presence during these years inescapably permeated these works.

Concurrently during the early 1970s, Ha made several works with permutations of "Relation" in their title. In 1971, he made a Relation work at Hongik University by amassing sand into large, pyramid-like piles at the base of university building columns. In 1972 at Gin Gallery in Tokyo, Ha displayed Relation 72-11 (1972), which consisted of a wooden plinth precariously perched upon a rope, and, elsewhere in the same gallery, a second wooden plinth standing upright on the floor with a loop of rope encircling it. For a third work—created to join works by the artists Lee Ufan and Kim Kulim to collectively form the group "Terme relationnel" within the seventh Paris Biennial—Ha poured wet cement into the sacks that originally packaged it, where it dried. In particular, because it was shown alongside Lee Ufan's artwork and contextualized by a catalogue essay written by Lee Ufan, Ha's "Terme relationnel" work was brought into conversation with Lee Ufan's phenomenological definition of art that informed the artistic practices of Mono-ha. Nonetheless, Joan Kee contends that Ha Chong Hyun's work does not completely fit within definitions of Mono-ha; she underscores that Ha's works during these years aimed to perturb "the lines separating painting from sculpture" to a much further extent than Japanese Mono-ha artists did.

=== Conjunction series: 1974–present ===
The work which Ha considers to be the first of his Conjunction series was Work 74-A (1974), for which Ha lay wooden slats wrapped in brown paper upon a layer of white oil paint, then uprighted the materials so that the thick paint would ooze downward, between the slats.

Ha's Conjunction paintings were first publicly presented in June 1974 at Myeongdong Gallery in Seoul. The Conjunction works presented were his first forays into his "from-the-back method" (baeapbeop), for which he began with burlap stretched as a pictorial plane, then pushed paint through the burlap's fibers, from the back to the front of the work. For some of these paintings, he uprighted the work so that the paint dripped down its surface; for others, he then swept across the canvas to distribute, diffuse, and smooth over the paint. Across these earliest versions of Conjunction, Ha Chong-hyun chose to use only white paint. As Joan Kee has provided, Ha chose white because it strongly contrasted with the dark, earthen burlap, to the extent that their interplay would emphasize the paint's materiality—which, in turn, would undermine interpretations of his paintings merely in terms of the symbolism of whiteness, one associated with Zen philosophy and pre-modern tradition.

As Ha pursued his Conjunction series into the late 1970s and beyond, he increasingly used tools like knives, trowels, brushes, and wire to spread and/or inscribe forms upon the paint after pushing it through burlap, sometimes in ways that ultimately flattened his initial gestures of painting from the back. He also moved to other hues of paint, first to mixing paints to resemble the tone of hemp; according to Joan Kee, this was a choice to ensure that the pictorial plane, gesture, and support each held equal weight in defining the work. In the early 1980s, Ha turned to using black, navy, green and gray paints, one color per work. In more recent iterations (since c. 2014), Ha has experimented with burning Conjunction paintings' surface and employed bright dancheng colors, both reminiscent of his earliest paintings of the 1960s.

Criticism and scholarship on Ha Chong-hyun's Conjunction series centers upon the interplay of two or all of the following aspects: (1) the painting as recording the artist's physical engagement with his materials, (2) the materiality of paint and burlap as foregrounded by their organic interaction, and (3) Ha's activation of the three-dimensionality of the painting plane by painting from his work's back side. For example, the art historian Phil Lee has explained the significance of the series' title as two-fold: it describes the conjunction of the artist's body meeting his materials and the conjunction of one material meeting another. Another example is Yoon Jin Sup's interpretation of Conjunction; Yoon finds Ha to "overthrow the 'convention' in painting" of flatness by focusing on its backside, as well as to "[reveal] the antagonistic relationship between the different materials of the hempen canvas, pigment and oil." Among their interpretations of Conjunction, some scholars have critically and vocally turning away from Orientalizing cultural symbolism. As Joan Kee has qualified, "commentators on Ha—and for that matter [D]ansaekhwa artists in general—too frequently tries the patience of its readers by invoking ambiguous references to Zen, calligraphy, or nature without properly addressing the fundamentally materialist nature of his commitments." Similarly, Phil Lee has argued that "what is significant is to discover not only Korean (Asian) beauty but also the universal resonance embodied in [Ha's] works."

=== Post-Conjunction series: 2010–present ===
In 2010, Ha began his Post-Conjunction series with the declaration that he would make the critical and deliberate choice to further explore color. Many Post-Conjunction works are made by oozing paint from the rear of the canvas around circular forms, or squeezing it between wooden slats, which are wrapped in materials like canvas or burlap, occasionally singed by fire, and arranged in rows upon the pictorial plane. On occasion, after this oozing, Ha goes over the surface with additional tools—wire, brush—to perturb the paint's geometric delineations. Brightly hued, often with obangsaek colors, these works go beyond Conjunction to interrogate color's impact upon materiality, as Joan Kee has observed.

== Public and private collections ==
- Art and Culture Foundation of Ilshin, Seoul, South Korea
- Art Institute of Chicago, Chicago, USA
- Ewha Women's University Museum, Seoul, South Korea
- Fukuoka Museum, Fukuoka, Japan
- Gwangju Museum of Art, Gwangju, South Korea
- Gyeonggi Museum of Modern Art, Ansan, South Korea
- The Hiroshima City Museum of Contemporary Art, Hiroshima, Japan
- Hoam Art Museum, Yongjin, South Korea
- Hongik Museum of Art, Hongik University, Seoul, South Korea
- Leeum, Samsung Museum of Art, Seoul, South Korea
- M+, Hong Kong
- Mie Prefectural Art Museum, Mie, Japan
- Miyagi Museum of Art, Miyagi, Japan
- Museum of Fine Arts, Boston, USA
- Museum of Modern Art, New York City, USA
- Museum of Modern Art, Toyama, Toyama, Japan
- National Museum of Modern and Contemporary Art, Gwacheon, South Korea
- Posco Gallery, Seoul, South Korea
- Rachofsky Collection, Dallas, USA
- Seoul Museum of Art, Seoul, South Korea
- Seoul Olympic Museum of Art, Seoul, South Korea
- Solomon R. Guggenheim Museum, New York City, USA
- Shimonoseki City Art Museum, Shimonoseki, Japan
- Tokyo Metropolitan Art Museum, Tokyo, Japan
