= Sungkok Art Museum =

- Location: Jongno-gu, Seoul, South Korea
- Type: art museum
- Collection size: 650 m^{2} (7,000 sq ft)
- Website: sungkokmuseum.com

Korean name
- Hangul: 성곡미술관
- Hanja: 省谷美術館
- RR: Seonggok misulgwan
- MR: Sŏnggok misulgwan

The Sungkok Art Museum is a famous museum in Jongno-gu, Seoul, South Korea.

== See also ==
- List of museums in South Korea
