= Kim Kulim =

South Korean artist

- Born: 1936; Sangju, North Gyeongsang province, Korea
- Known for: Experimental art, mail art, land art, performance art

Kim Kulim (김구림, also frequently romanized as Kim Ku-lim; born 1936 in Sangju, North Gyeongsang province, Korea) is a South Korean artist. Primarily self-taught, Kim Kulim's artistic practice has been shaped by his involvement in Seoul's experimental art scene in the late 1960s and early 1970s, his exposure to Japan's art scene in the mid-1970s, and his decades in the United States (where he lived from 1984 to 2000). Never limiting himself to abiding by artistic conventions, Kim has repeatedly transgressed boundaries, in ways that the art critic Oh Kwang-su has described as extending an experimental spirit into his present-day artistic practice.

In his early work, Kim quickly departed from the conventions of painting by incorporating industrial materials and performing destructive acts such as burning his artwork. Beginning in 1969, his pursuit of happenings led him to multiple "firsts" — Korea's first works of mail art and land art, as well as a harbinger of experimental film. Concurrently, Kim was a founding member of two artist groups, AG (short for the Korean Avant-Garde Art Association, active 1969–1974; the first artist group to explore the role of the avant-garde in Korea) and the notorious The Fourth Group. With later decades spent abroad, his practice became transnationally shaped while also centering concepts of Eastern thought, namely, Yin and Yang.

As the critic Oh observed, across his artistic career, Kim has progressively expanded his practice to span a wide array of media and activities — and yet, Kim has never been concerned with the confines of artistic genres. Instead, concepts and ideas have served as a guide for how Kim's artworks have materialized.

== Biography ==
Following his childhood in the central area of the Korean peninsula, Kim Kulim enrolled in a nearby art college in North Gyeongsang province. In the midst of his first year, he dropped out because the school's reinforcement of an academic canon, centered upon French modern masters such as Matisse and Cézanne, disinterested him. Instead, Kim wanted to study more contemporaneous artists; he turned to the pages of Life and Time magazines (brought to the Korean peninsula by the U.S. military), where he first learned about Jackson Pollack and Pierre Soulages. Kim made his artistic debut in Daegu; there, he held his first solo exhibition in 1958 at the Daegu Public Information Center, at which he presented a series of abstract paintings. Beginning in the 1960s, he pivoted to more experimental art forms. The works of his second solo exhibition, shown in Busan in 1967, pursued pictorial and material abstraction by way of acts of performance. Nonetheless, feeling rejected by Daegu's art scene of university-graduated artists, in 1968 Kim moved to Seoul (where he also began a position as a planning director for YOUYOUNG Industries). In 1969, he became a founding member the group AG; in 1970, he joined other intellectuals—artists and performers, as well as those interested in religion, politics, theatre, music and society, each of whom were discontent with institutional conventions and shared the belief that art should make a greater impact upon life—to establish The Fourth Group. After mounting events in public that proved incendiary, The Fourth Group disbanded following intensive interrogation from the government and Kim Kulim's own arrest and detention. Thereafter, Kim Kulim went to Japan, where he spent 1973–1975 and presented three solo exhibitions in 1973, 1974, and 1977. From 1984 to 1991, Kim Kulim lived in New York, where he studied at the Art Students League of New York. In 1991, he moved to Los Angeles. In 2000, he returned to South Korea, where he currently lives and works.

== Notable artworks ==
=== Death of Sun series (1964) ===
From early abstract paintings marked with figurative gestures, Kim Kulim began to explore highly unconventional, experimental methods and materials for art making beginning in the mid-1960s. In series such as Tombstone (1963) and Nucleus (1964), Kim combined oil painting on panel with plastic, steel, and vinyl. His Death of Sun (1967) series (examples of which are held in the collections of Tate Modern and the National Museum of Modern and Contemporary Art, Korea) built upon these previous series with the destructive action of burning—actions which, as art historian Joan Kee as argued, qualify these works not only as paintings, but also as performance. For Death of Sun I (1967), Kim first covered panel in vinyl and painted it with oil, then set it on fire and, finally, extinguished the fire by smothering the work with a blanket. For Death of Sun II, Kim additionally collaged metal washers upon his work's surface, creating a work that Kee has proclaimed as "among the first artworks in Korea to recognize as central the commodity nature of the art object." Indeed, made during Korea's years of rapid industrialization that saw the establishment of many factories, Death of Sun II incorporates a spare part (washers) from the textile factory where Kim was then a manager. Similarly, a second material of the artwork, vinyl, was ubiquitously produced by Korean factories during this time. It is through Kim's incorporation of these two materials that Kee has concluded that Death of Sun II alludes to Korea's prolific production of material goods amidst the alacrity of national development. Nonetheless, with Kim's violent, final choice to set the work aflame, Kee finds Death of Sun works to rise as a challenge to artistic conventions, interrogating which materials and actions qualify as producing an artwork.

=== Experiments in Seoul, 1969–1970 ===
After Kim Kulim moved to Seoul in 1968, his experimentation expanded dramatically as he pursued new dimensions of art practice, notably by dabbling in film and performing happenings.

As the head of public relations efforts for YOUYOUNG industries, Kim Kulim gained access to film equipment used for making promotional content. Kim first took up 8mm film for Civilization, Women, Money, which he began directing in early 1969. The film provides a fly-on-the-wall perspective upon the life of a young women who, like many others in her generation, moved to Seoul to find factory work, but ultimately fell into prostitution because they were unable to obtain other employment opportunities. After beginning to film, the actress did not show up for a second day of work, and so the film was left unfinished. It was ultimately completed in 2016.

Kim's second film project, The Meaning of 1/24 of a Second (1969), involved the artist Chung Chan-seung as an actor and has been heralded as Korea's first avant-garde film. Originally filmed with 16mm film, the work's title alludes to film's pace (24 frames per second). The film shows a flitting montage of scenes from around Seoul, from the railing of an elevated expressway to street crowds, from blooming cigarette smoke to high-rise buildings in construction. Reminiscent of daily life in the quickly-urbanizing city, the film documented South Korea's new modernity with a touch of cynicism, underscored by interstitial clips of Chung's slow yawn. The film's first public screening at Seoul's Academy Music Hall in 1969 met a series of technical issues that prevented the work from being shown as planned (projected onto a series of objects and the bodies of 20 dancers). Reacting quickly, Chung screened the work via three slide projectors onto the bodies of Kim Kulim and the artist Chung Kang-ja, who were dressed in white from head to toe.

Concurrently, Kim pursued other works that superseded existing artistic genres as they extended art into the spheres of society and the natural environment. In the fall of 1969, Kim collaborated with the artist Kim Tchah-Sup for Relics of Mass Media (considered Korea's first instance of mail art). For this project, the two artists mailed a series of three consecutive letters to 100 recipients. The first and second letters separately contained torn paper with the two artists' names, and fingerprints marked their envelopes. The third letter relayed a message, "You enjoyed the relics of mass media one day ago." As the curator Sook-kyung Lee has observed, by leaving open the ways recipients would respond and involving them as participants, Relics of Mass Media pursued art as defined not by the act of creation, but instead by the ways of its reception.

The next year, Kim mounted a series of happening-like projects under the title From Phenomenon to Traces (1970), each of which aimed to express time in physical, material ways and resulted in friction with institutional conventions. For The Grand Art Exhibition of Korea at the Gyeongbokgung Museum, Kim planned to install a From Phenomenon to Traces work of a giant block of ice (which would melt over days of the exhibition), covered in red cloth. However, the exhibition's organizers, fearing water damage, denied Kim's submission. For From Phenomenon to Traces D, Kim wrapped the exterior of the Gyeongbokgung Museum in white cotton cloth, upon which was written "The Sum of 9 Million Won." Perceived by the Museum as rendering its building like a house in mourning, this work was dismantled after only 26 hours. Kim staged a third From Phenomenon to Traces work (recognized as Korea's first work of land art) on April 11, 1970, on the banks of the Han River. There, Kim demarcated five triangles, spanning 100 meters in total, on the grassy bank. He then doused the areas in gasoline and set them on fire, one by one. Months later, the grass on the bank grew once again, eventually erasing all traces of this artwork. Mounted outside of conventional spaces for making and exhibiting art, the work inserted art into a space that belonged to both the public and nature, and it allowed the environment to take part in the creative act. As the critic Oh Kwang-su later reflected, this work demonstrated Kim's interest in how time becomes embedded and realized within an artwork, from the work's conception to its destruction.

For information on Kim Kulim's projects with The Fourth Group during these years, see The Fourth Group.

=== Years in Japan, 1973–1975 ===
After The Fourth Group disbanded under duress from governmental investigations, Kim left South Korea for Japan's art scene. There, Kim made artworks that explored intersections such as performance and video, and possibilities such as turning everyday objects into sculpture. His video work Wiping Cloth (1974) activated the ability of video editing to compress an extensive process into just a few minutes. Wiping Cloth shows a person endlessly wiping a dirty table with a cloth, until the cloth itself is completely soiled, then worn and tattered, and, finally, disintegrates on the table, making the table dirty once again. For several artworks, Kim employed everyday objects in ways that stripped them of their utilitarian value. He began with the simple action of installing these objects within an exhibition space, taking up a Duchampian approach by leaving room for an exhibition space's recontextualization to turn the ordinary into art. However, Kim reconsidered this method after a Japanese art critic asked him to consider how, in 100 years, these art objects would differ from everyday objects. After three months of pondering this question, Kim decided to it was imperative to more overtly transform the objects. Thereafter, he began to alter his objects; he silkscreened a stained area on a tablecloth, shattered a shovel's blade into pieces, and painted the form of a teacup on a teacup itself.

=== Yin and Yang series (c. late 1980s to present) ===
Following his move to New York City in 1984, Kim Kulim began to work in more two-dimensional artistic media, starting with his studies in printmaking at the Art Students League of New York. Born from this transition, his Yin and Yang series (begun in the late 1980s) has emphasized dualities—drawing upon the twin concepts of Eastern thought in its title—often through painting, printmaking, and/or collage. When describing this series, Oh Kwang-su observed repeated subjects of ordinary objects, rendered incompletely with forms that oscillate between unfinished and effaced, in ways that foreground the artistic process instead of aiming to capture reality.
