= Seoul Museum of Art =

Art Museum in Seoul, South Korea

Coordinates: 37°33′50.84″N 126°58′25.71″E

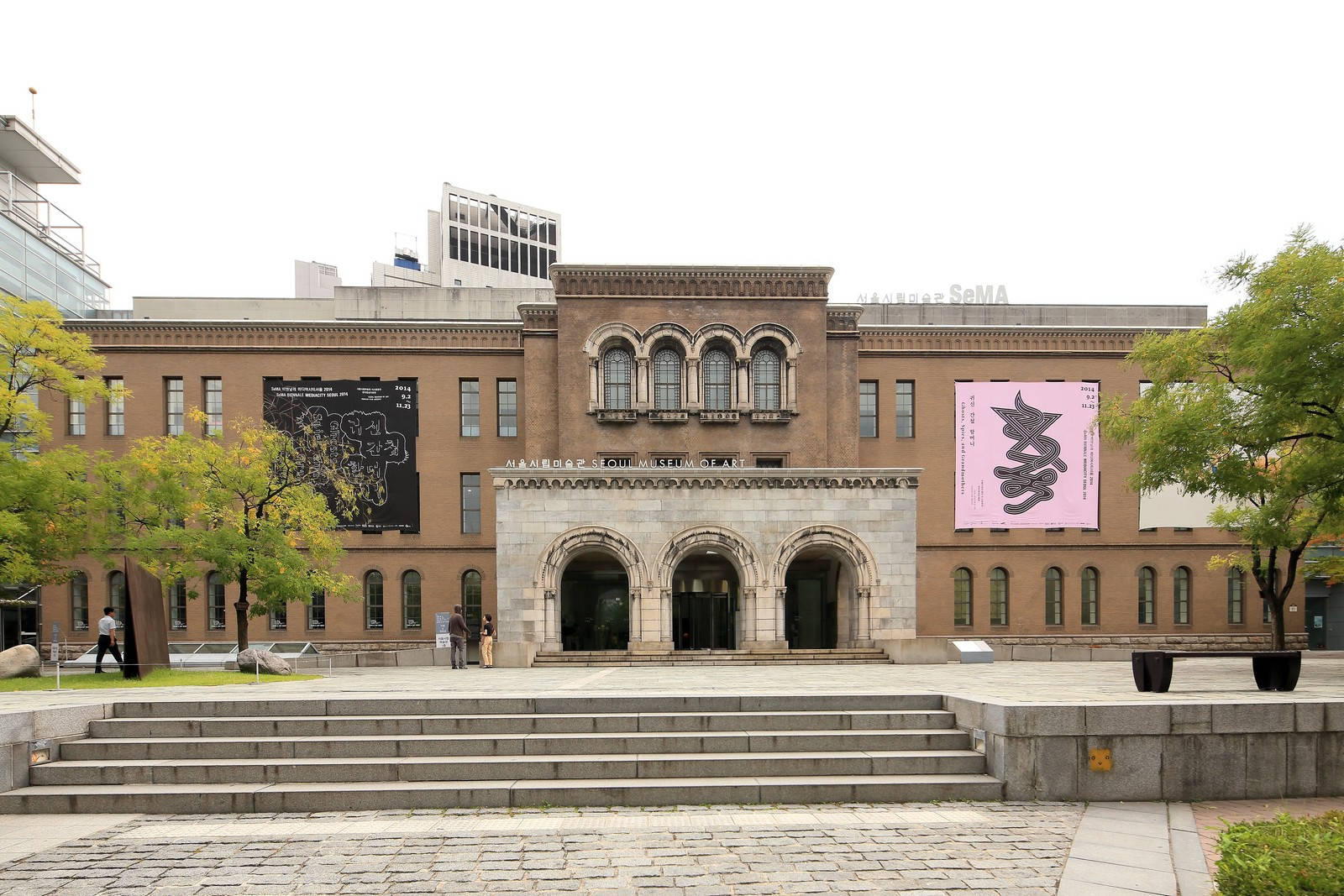
- Seoul Museum of Art building in 2014
- Interactive map of the Seoul Museum of Art area

General information
- Type: Art Museum
- Location: Misulgwan-gil 30 (Seosomun-dong 37), Jung-gu, Seoul, South Korea
- Opened: August 19, 1988
- Renovated: 2002

Technical details
- Floor count: 3 Stories and 2 Basements
- Floor area: 13,434 square meters

Design and construction
- Architecture firm: Samoo Architects & Engineers

Other information
- Public transit: Subway Lines 1 & 2, City Hall Station, Exit 10

Website
- sema.seoul.go.kr

Korean name
- Hangul: 서울시립미술관
- Hanja: 서울市立美術館
- Revised Romanization: Seoul Sirip Misulgwan
- McCune–Reischauer: Sŏul Sirip Misulgwan

The Seoul Museum of Art (Korean: 서울시립미술관) is an art museum operated by Seoul City Council and located in central of Seoul, South Korea.

== History ==
It was opened in the Gyeonghuigung Palace area, a royal palace of Joseon dynasty, with six exhibition rooms and an outdoor sculpture park. However, in 2002 a larger main branch was opened behind Deoksugung Palace, replacing the Gyeonguigung Branch as the main branch. Occupying the old Korean Supreme Court building this remodeled and renovated version houses three floors of exhibition halls, a connected administration annex, and a basement with lecture halls, classrooms and offices. The museum has two more branches in Seoul: one is located in Nowon District (SeMA Buk-Seoul) and the other is located in Namhyeon-dong, Gwanak-gu (SeMA Nam-Seoul).

The museum's main branch offers a wide variety of services to the general public. Offered by the museum are low, or no-cost, public art classes in Korean traditional arts, docent programs in English and Korean and lectures open to the public in order to further its mission.

== Branches ==
- Seoul Museum of Art Seosomun Main Branch (SeMA), opened in 1988
- Nam-Seoul Museum of Art, opened in 2004
- Nanji Residency Seoul Museum of Art, opened in 2006
- Buk-Seoul Museum of Art, opened in 2013
- Art Archives, Seoul Museum of Art, opened in 2023
- Photograpic Arts Center, Seoul Museum of Art (Photo SeMA), opened in 2025
- SeMA Nam June Paik Memorial House

== Collection ==
The museum's collection includes the SeMA Collection 200, a selection of 200 artists drawn from works owned by the museum. According to the Seoul Museum of Art, its holdings exceeded 4,500 works in 2015, after which the museum selected 200 artists for its "Collection Highlights". The selection is organized by the artists' working periods, ranging from the 1940s to the 2010s.

The museum also holds donated collections, including the GanaArt Collection and the Chun Kyung-ja Collection. The GanaArt Collection comprises 200 works donated by GanaArt founder Lee Ho-jae, with more than 160 works by Korean artists associated with Minjung art. The Chun Kyung-ja Collection comprises 93 works donated by the artist Chun Kyung-ja in 1998.

== Directors ==
The Seoul Museum of Art's current seventh director Eun-ju Choi was officially appointed on March 30, 2023.

Directors of the Seoul Museum of Art
No.	Director	Date appointed
1	Yoo Jun-sang	June 1, 1999
2	Ha Chong-Hyun	January 1, 2003
3	Ryu Hee-Young	January 12, 2007
4	Kim Hong-hee	January 12, 2012
5	Choi Hyo-jun	February 9, 2017
6	Jee-sook Beck	March 30, 2019

== See also ==
- Ilmin Museum of Art
- Korean art
- List of museums in Seoul
- List of museums in South Korea
