= Kishio Suga =

Japanese artist

Kishio Suga 菅木志雄
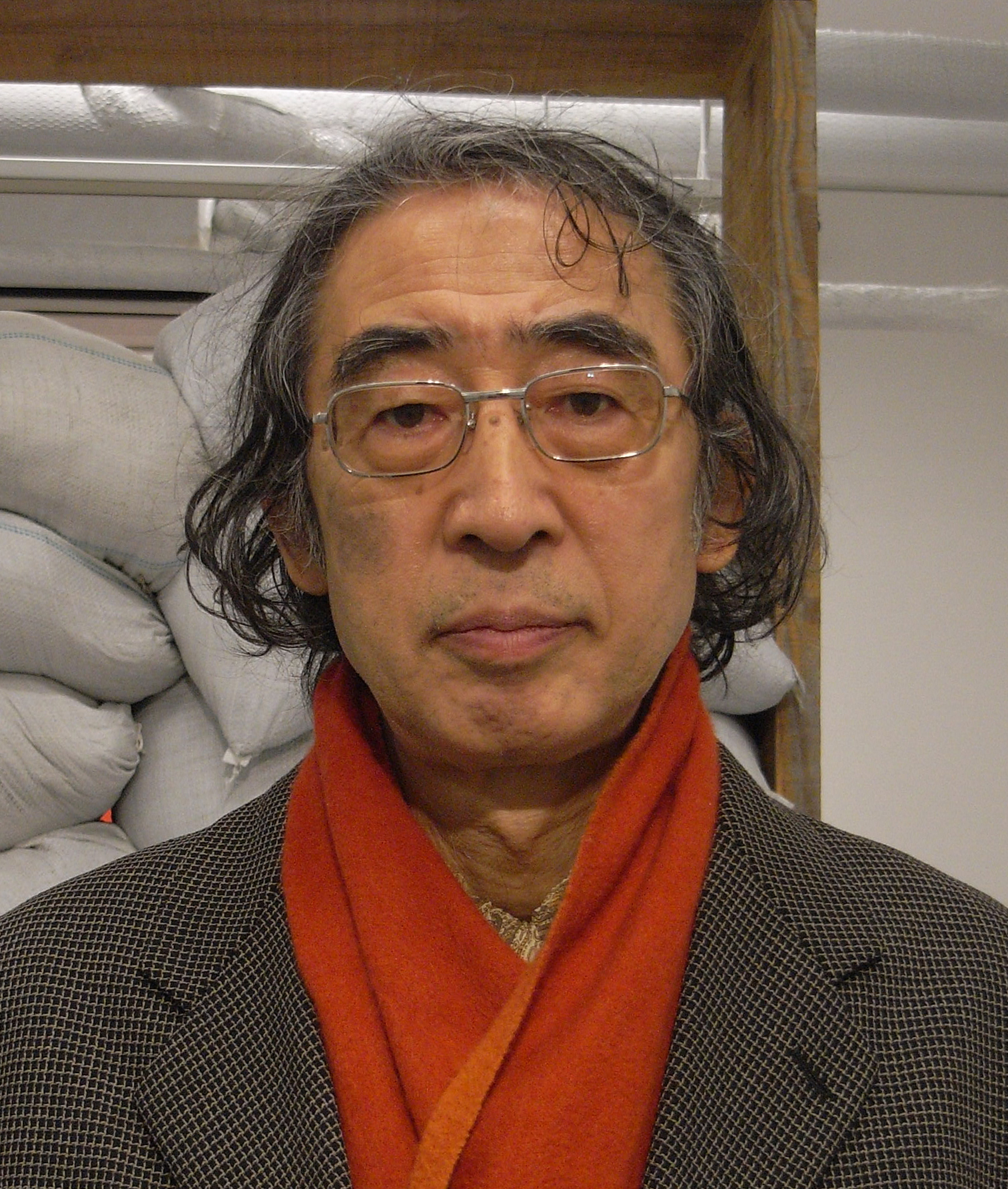
- Kishio Suga in Tokyo Photo: Tsuyoshi Sato
- Born: February 19, 1944 (age 82); Japan・Morioka, Iwate
- Education: Tama Art University
- Known for: Contemporary Art
- Notable work: Infinite Situation I (window)
- Movement: Mono-ha

Kishio Suga (菅 木志雄, Suga Kishio) (born 1944), is a Japanese sculptor and installation artist currently living in Itō, Shizuoka, Japan.

He is one of the key members of Mono-ha, a group of artists who became prominent in the late 1960s and 1970s. The Mono-ha artists explored the encounter between natural and industrial materials, such as stone, steel plates, glass, light bulbs, cotton, sponge, paper, wood, wire, rope, leather, oil, and water, arranging them in mostly unaltered, ephemeral states. The works focus as much on the interdependency of these various elements and the surrounding space as on the materials themselves.

== Career ==
Kishio Suga was born in Morioka, Iwate Prefecture. From 1964 to 1968, he was a student in the painting department at Tama Art University in Tokyo. While at Tama, Suga read the writings of Jean Baudrillard, Gilles Deleuze, Kitarō Nishida, Kei Nishitani, Nāgārjuna, and Vasubandhu.

During this period, two artists who taught at the university were important influences on Suga. Yoshishige Saitō encouraged Suga and other students to take a deconstructive approach to modernism and Euro-American-centric art theory. Another influential teacher was the artist Jiro Takamatsu, whose illusionistic paintings and sculpture were central to the development of the Tokyo art scene at that time. Suga's early work reflected this approach. In his first solo exhibition, at Tsubaki Kindai Gallery, Tokyo, in November 1968, Suga presented Space Transformation (1968) (転移空間), a freestanding structure of red-painted wood that gave the illusion of a stack of boxes collapsing under their own weight.

At the same time as Suga was producing these illusionistic paintings and sculptures, he was already shifting to an engagement with raw materials in works such as Layered Space (1968) (積層空間), a transparent acrylic box containing layers of sawdust, cotton, ashes, plastic dust, and soil.

In the second half of 1968, this exploration of raw materials, ephemerality and space gained recognition as a broader movement. Lee Ufan presented his first work juxtaposing rocks and steel plates. At the 1st Kobe Suma Rikyū Park Contemporary Sculpture Exhibition (第一回野外彫刻展), Nobuo Sekine presented Phase—Mother Earth (位相—大地), a cylindrical hole in the earth, 2.7 meters deep and 2.2 meters in diameter, with the excavated earth molded into a cylinder of exactly the same dimensions.

By 1973, Kishio Suga, Lee Ufan, Nobuo Sekine, and other artists such as Susumu Koshimizu, Katsuro Yoshida, and Kōji Enokura, became collectively known as Mono-ha (literally “School of Things”).

Suga came to articulate his ideas in terms of hōchi (放置, release), an act that highlights the reality of mono (もの, things) and their interdependence with the surrounding jōkyō (状況, situation, context, or expanse). In his ongoing investigation of "situation" and the "activation (アクティベーション) of existence," Suga has produced many installations that are emblematic of the Mono-ha approach.

Infinite Situation I (window) (1970) (無限状況), consisted of two blocks of wood of different lengths propping open adjacent windows in a staircase at the Trends in Contemporary Art exhibition at the National Museum of Modern Art, Kyoto, in 1970.

In 1971, Suga created Law of Situation (状況律), the artist placed ten flat stones in a line on a 20-meter-long pane of glass and floated it on the surface of a lake in Tokiwa Park, Ube City, Yamaguchi Prefecture.

In the State of Equal Dimension (1973) (等間体) is made up of two tall, forked branches that support a length of rope at four points along a corner of the gallery wall; each end of the rope is tied to a rock that rests on the floor.

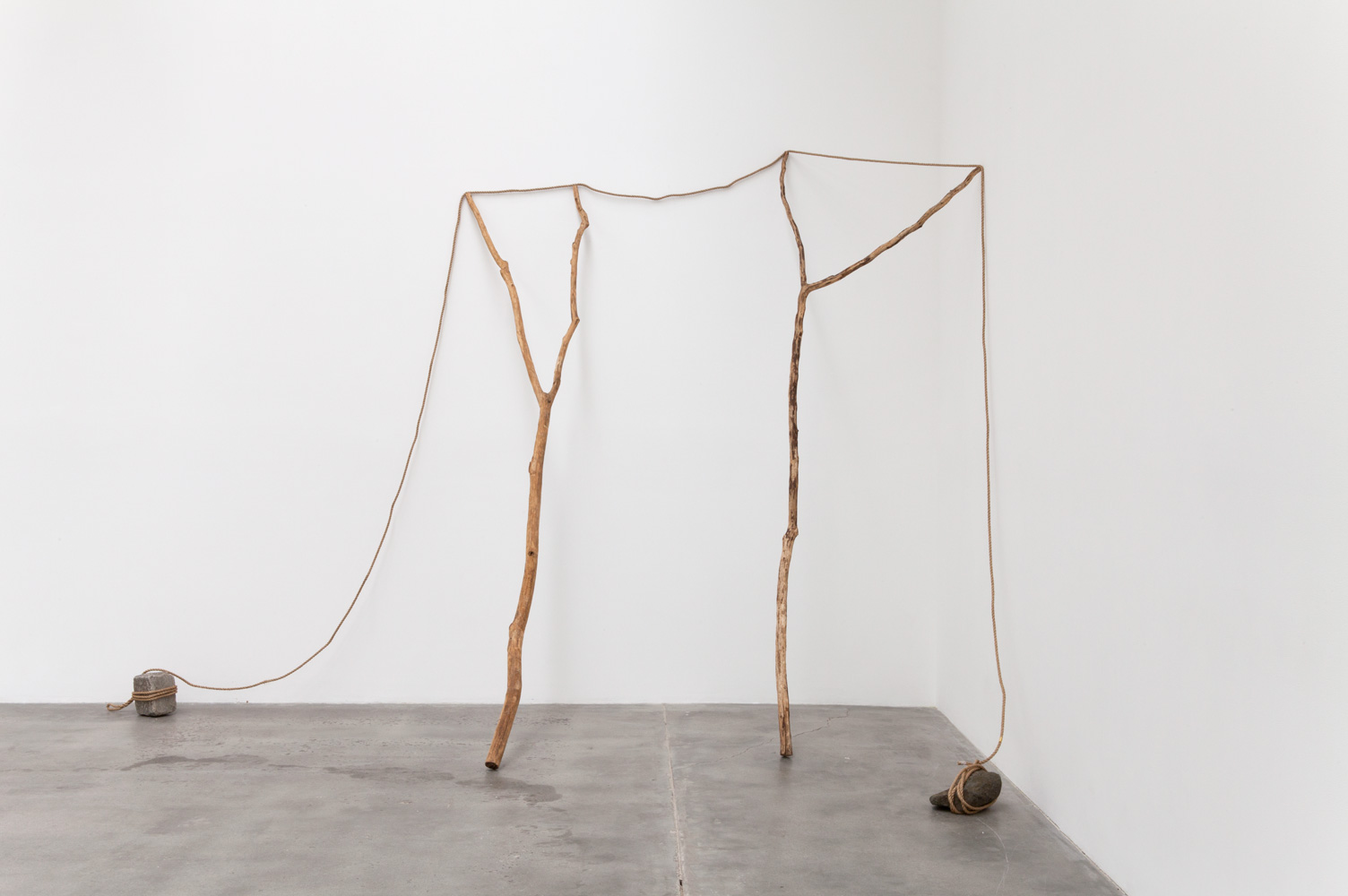
"In the State of Equal Dimension (Tōkantai)", 1973 Branches, rope, stone Courtesy of the artist and Blum & Poe

Law of Multitude (1975) (多分律) consisted of an undulating expanse of transparent plastic sheeting laid on some dozens of concrete columns, each one topped by a single stone.

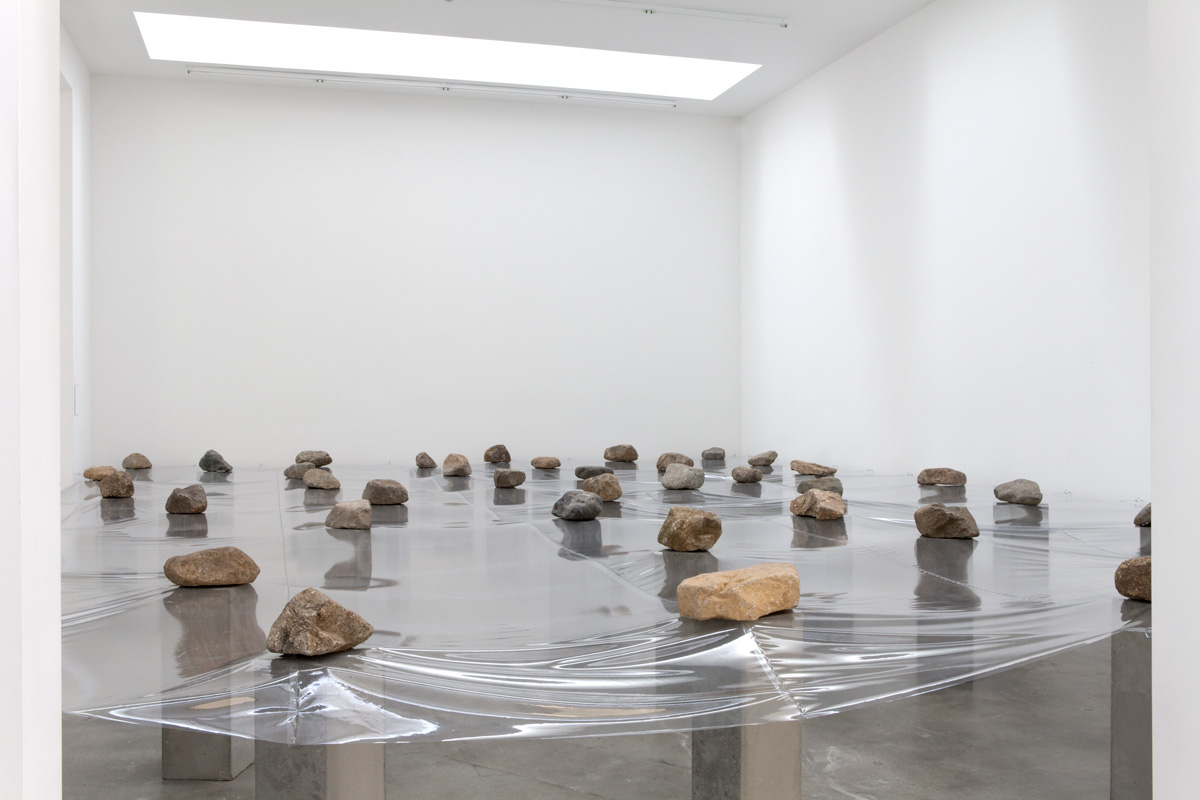
"Law of Multitude (Tabunritsu)", 1975 Dimensions variable overall, vinyl, stone, cement blocks Courtesy of the artist and Blum & Poe

In addition to his site-specific installations, Suga also makes smaller assemblages that display on the wall or floor. Suga variously ties, binds, stacks, cuts, glues, paints, tapes, wedges, leans, peels, nails, screws, carves, bends, and folds these materials into their current forms.

== Exhibitions ==
Kishio Suga's first solo exhibition was at Tsubaki Kindai Gallery, Tokyo, in 1968. Since then, he has had numerous solo shows in Japan, including at the Iwate Museum of Art, Morioka; the Yokohama Museum of Art; the Chiba City Museum of Art; the Hiroshima City Museum of Contemporary Art; and the Museum of Contemporary Art, Tokyo.

His work has also been included in landmark surveys, such as the 8th Biennale de Paris in 1973; Japon des Avant Gardes 1910–1970, Centre Georges Pompidou, Paris, 1986; Japanese Art after 1945: Scream Against the Sky, held at Yokohama Museum of Art, Guggenheim Museum Soho, New York, and San Francisco Museum of Modern Art, 1994; and Reconsidering Mono-ha, National Museum of Art, Osaka, 2005.

In 2008, Kishio Suga Souko Museum opened at Itamuro Onsen Daikokuya, Tochigi prefecture. This museum houses a large selection of Suga's indoor sculptural works and several outdoor sculpture gardens designed and installed by Suga.

His work has received renewed attention in the United States following his inclusion in Requiem for the Sun: The Art of Mono-ha, at Blum & Poe, Los Angeles, in February 2012. This exhibition was the first survey of Mono-ha in the United States, and was followed by a solo exhibition at Blum & Poe in November 2012, which was his first solo show in the United States. Suga's work was also featured in Tokyo 1955–1970: A New Avant Garde at the Museum of Modern Art, New York, in 2012. In 2016, Suga was commissioned by the Dia Art Foundation to resurrect one of his site-responsive works from the 1970s at Dia:Chelsea.

In 2024, he was part of the collective exhibition called Without Stars 2, which was installed at the Experimental Exhibition room located in the Museum of Fine Arts in Caracas (Venezuela), where an exhibition copy authorized and supervised by Blum Gallery Law of Multitude was shown together with artworks by Gary Kuehn, Meyer Vaisman, Annette Lemieux, Eduardo Azuaje and Mario Pérez who also curated the event.

== Collections ==
Kishio Suga's work is in the collection of numerous museums, including:

- Chiba City Museum of Art, Chiba
- Dallas Museum of Art, Texas
- Glenstone Foundation, Potomac, Maryland
- Guggenheim Abu Dhabi, Abu Dhabi
- Hiroshima City Museum of Contemporary Art, Hiroshima
- Museum of Contemporary Art, Tokyo
- National Museum of Art, Osaka
- National Museum of Modern Art, Tokyo
- Tate Modern, London
- Tokyo Metropolitan Art Museum, Tokyo
- Yokohama Museum of Art, Kanagawa
- Dia Art Foundation, New York

== Awards ==
Kishio Suga was awarded the 11th Shell Art Prize in 1967, the Grand Prize at the 5th Japan Art Festival in 1970, and Mainichi Awards in 2016. He teaches at Tama Art University, Tokyo.

== Bibliography ==
- Japon des avant gardes: 1910–1970. Paris: Centre Georges Pompidou, 1986.
- Kishio Suga. Los Angeles: Blum & Poe, 2012
- Kishio Suga [1968–1988]. Texts by Kishio Suga and Toshiaki Minemura. Tokyo: Kishio Suga, 1988.
- Chong, Doryun. Tokyo 1955–1970: A New Avant-Garde. New York: Museum of Modern Art, 2012.
- Koplos, Janet. Contemporary Japanese Sculpture. New York: Abbeville Press, 1991.
- Yoshitake, Mika. Requiem for the Sun: The Art of Mono-ha. Los Angeles: Blum & Poe, 2012.
- Suga Kishio. Texts by Hitoshi Dehara, Toshiaki Minemura, and Kishio Suga. Tokyo: Yomiuri Shinbunsha, Bijutsu renraku kyōgikai, 1997.
- Rawlings, Ashley. Kishio Suga. Los Angeles: Blum & Poe, 2012.
