= Koji Enokura =

Japanese artist (1942-1995)

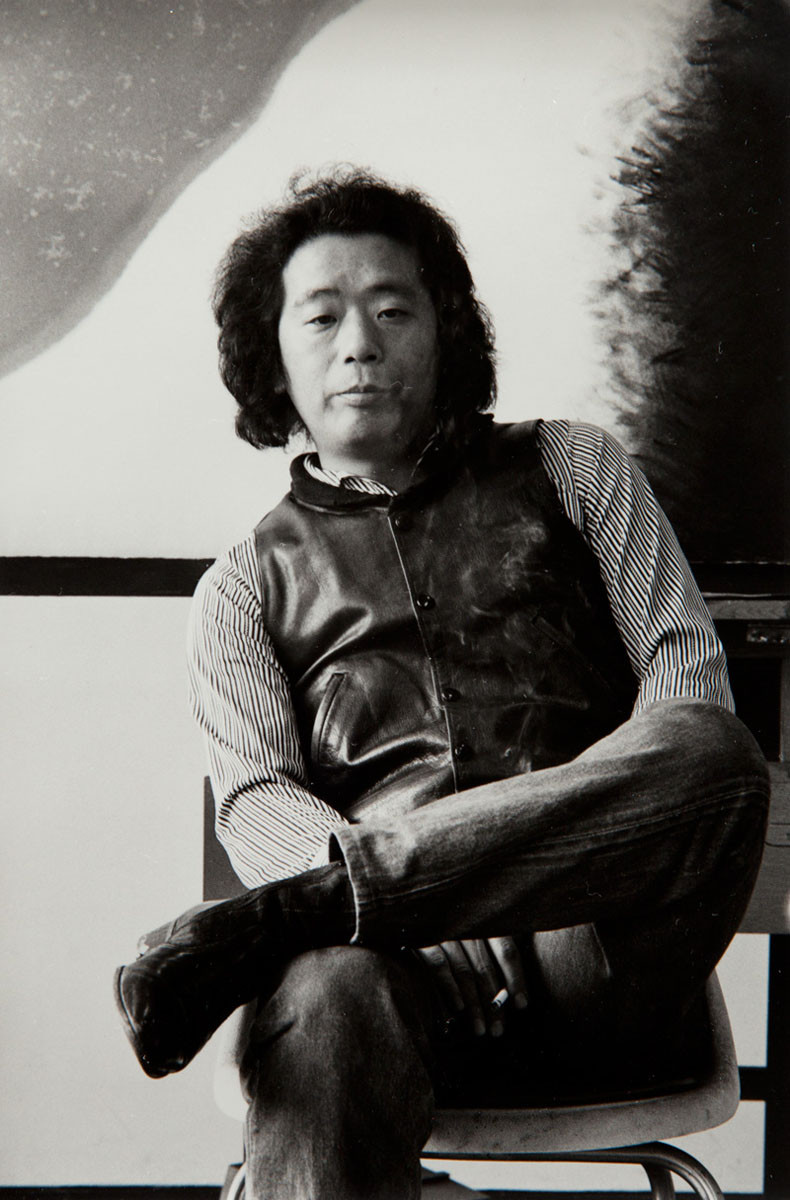
- Courtesy of the Estate of Koji Enokura
- Born: November 28, 1942; Japan・Setagaya, Tokyo
- Died: October 20, 1995 (aged 52)
- Education: Tokyo National University of Fine Arts and Music
- Known for: Contemporary Art
- Notable work: Wall (1971)
- Movement: Mono-ha

Kōji Enokura (榎倉康二, Enokura Kōji; 1942–1995) was a Japanese painter and installation artist.

He was one of the key members of Mono-ha, a group of artists who became prominent in the late 1960s and 1970s. The Mono-ha artists explored the encounter between natural and industrial materials, such as stone, steel plates, glass, light bulbs, cotton, sponge, paper, wood, wire, rope, leather, oil, and water, arranging them in mostly unaltered, ephemeral states. The works focus as much on the interdependency of these various elements and the surrounding space as on the materials themselves.

== Career ==
Kōji Enokura was born in Tokyo. In 1966, he graduated from the painting department at the Tokyo National University of Fine Arts and Music. Enokura received an MFA in painting at the same university in 1968, and taught there from 1975 until his death in 1995.

=== Site Specific Installations ===
From the beginning of the 1970s, Enokura stained paper, cloth, felt, and leather with oil and grease. He also discolored the floors and walls of galleries and outdoor spaces. These installations are no longer extant but are documented in photographs. In 1970, Enokura exhibited in Tokyo Biennale ’70 – Between Man and Matter, with Jiro Takamatsu and Susumu Koshimizu. World-renowned artists such as Richard Serra, Jannis Kounellis, Luciano Fabro, Christo and Bruce Nauman also exhibited. There he presented Place (1970), stacks of rough straw paper piled in different heights and soaked with oil.

One of his most notable works is Untitled (1970), a triangular structure of slashed leather placed on the floor in the corner, which highlights the relationship of the adjacent walls as much as the texture of its own surface. In a similar vein, for the Paris Youth Biennale in 1971, he constructed Wall, a three-meter-tall and five-meter-wide concrete partition between two trees in the Parc Floral. This work—for which he was awarded a scholarship that allowed him to live in Paris from 1973 to 1974—has been an enduring icon of his practice.

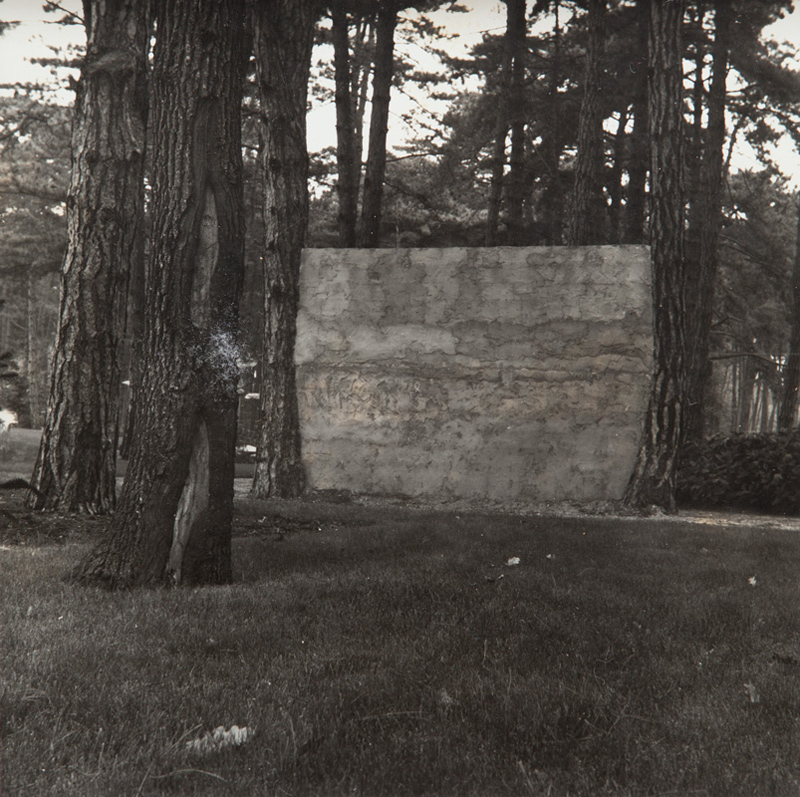
Installation view at the 7th Paris Youth Biennale "Wall" 1971 Concrete-blocks, mortar Courtesy of the Estate of Koji Enokura

Through interventions such as these, he sought to affirm his own place in the world. In his writings he stated, “It is the tension between the body and the material that interests me, and that’s what I want to explore. It attests to the consciousness I have of my own existence.”

By 1973, Kōji Enokura, Kishio Suga, Lee Ufan, Nobuo Sekine, and other artists such as Susumu Koshimizu, and Katsuro Yoshida became collectively known as Mono-ha (literally “School of Things”).

=== Photographs ===
In addition to taking photographs that served simply to document his ephemeral installations, Enokura also took photographs that he considered to be artworks in their own right. These explored similar themes of liminal states of being, depicting pools of water on the floor or trickling off a table, or reflections of light. One of the most iconic images, Symptom: Sea–Body (P.W. No. 40) , shows the artist lying down on the seashore, his body following the curve of the incoming tide. Of this work, curator Simon Groom wrote:

There can be no more poignant image of the body being our means of belonging to the world, nor of our desire to be united with the world around us and our consciousness of our separation from it, alternating like the endless ebb and flow of the waves washing upon the shore.

— Simon Groom, "Encountering Mono-ha", Mono-ha: School of Things, Kettle's Yard, pp. 17–19, 2002

=== Later works on canvas ===
During the 1980s and 1990s, Enokura continued to explore the act of staining on cotton-fabric. In these works, which are titled Intervention or Intervention (Story) and are numbered sequentially, the artist typically contrasted smooth fields of black paint with unpainted fabric, sometimes drenching the entire surface. In several canvases he used oil-soaked beams of lumber to mark the fabric—either affixing the beams to the work or leaning them against it.

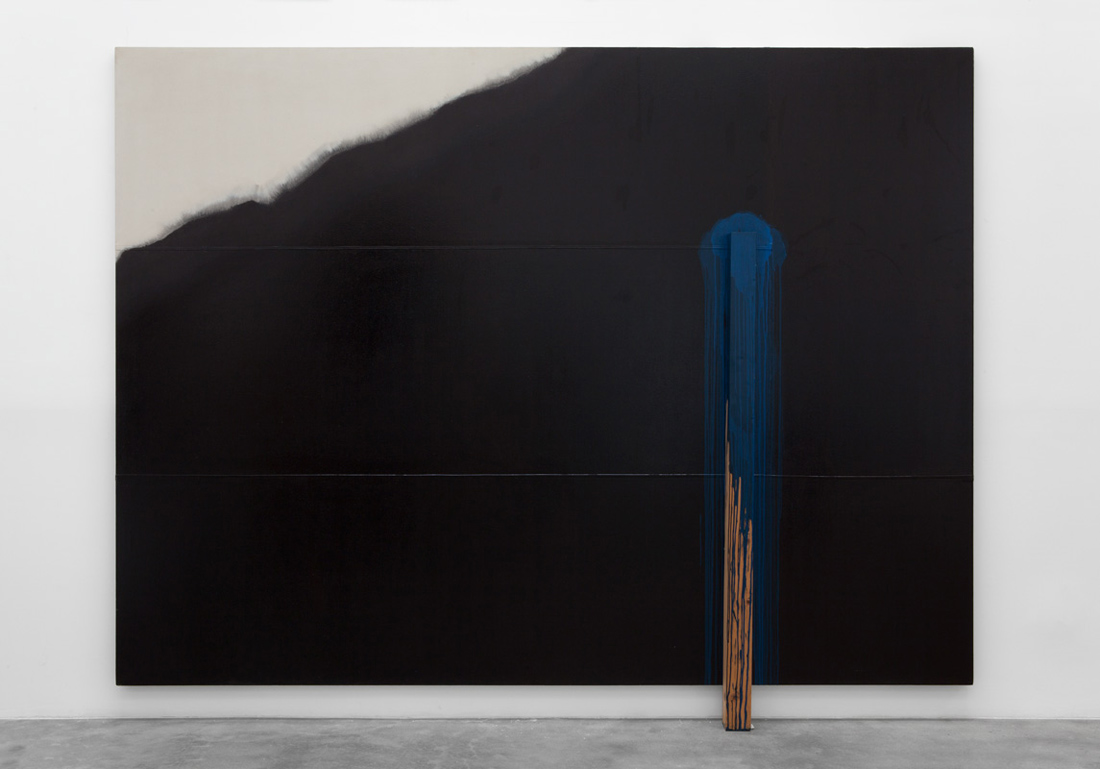
"Intervention No. 1", 1987 248.5 x 333.3 x 30 cm Cotton cloth, acrylic, wood Courtesy of the Estate of Koji Enokura and Blum & Poe Photo by Joshua White

Some works from this period feature shelves that support glass bottles filled with sand and water, or in one unusual case a potted plant. Enokura also created numerous works consisting of fabric in single or double layers hung diagonally on the wall and folding out onto the floor.

== Exhibitions ==
Kōji Enokura’s first solo exhibition was at Tsubaki Kindai Gallery, Tokyo, in 1969. Since then, he has had numerous solo shows in Japan, including the Saito Memorial Kawaguchi Museum of Contemporary Art and the National Museum of Art, Osaka, in 1994. In 2005, the Museum of Contemporary Art, Tokyo, held a major retrospective.

His work has also been included in landmark surveys, such as the Tokyo Biennale ’70: Between Man and Matter, Tokyo Metropolitan Art Museum, 1970; the Paris Biennale, 1971; the Biennale of Sydney, 1976; the Venice Biennale, 1978; Avanguardie Giapponese degli Anni 70, Galleria Comunale d’Arte Moderna di Bologna, 1992, and Setagaya Art Museum, Tokyo, 1993; Reconsidering Mono-ha, National Museum of Art, Osaka, 2005; and Re: Quest―Japanese Contemporary Art since the 1970s, Museum of Art, Seoul National University, Korea, 2013.

His work has received renewed attention in the United States following his inclusion in Requiem for the Sun: The Art of Mono-ha, at Blum & Poe, Los Angeles, in February 2012. This exhibition was the first survey of Mono-ha in the United States, and was followed by a solo exhibition at Blum & Poe in June 2013, which was his first solo show in the United States.

The estate of Kōji Enokura is represented by the galleries Blum & Poe (Los Angeles, New York, Tokyo), Fergus McCaffrey (New York), and Tokyo Gallery + BTAP (Tokyo, Beijing).

== Collections ==
Kōji Enokura’s work is in the collection of numerous museums, including:

- Aichi Prefectural Museum of Art, Nagoya
- Fukuoka Art Museum, Fukuoka
- Hara Museum of Contemporary Art, Tokyo
- Hiroshima City Museum of Contemporary Art, Hiroshima
- Hyogo Prefectural Museum of Art, Kobe
- Museum of Contemporary Art, Tokyo
- Museum of Modern Art, Saitama
- National Museum of Art, Osaka
- National Museum of Modern Art, Tokyo
- Punta della Dogana, Venice
- Setagaya Art Museum, Tokyo
- Tokyo Metropolitan Art Museum, Tokyo

== Bibliography ==
- Japon des avant gardes: 1910–1970. Paris: Centre Georges Pompidou, 1986.
- Kōji Enokura: A Retrospective. Tokyo: Museum of Contemporary Art, 2005.
- Chong, Doryun. Tokyo 1955–1970: A New Avant-Garde. New York: Museum of Modern Art, 2012.
- Yoshitake, Mika. Requiem for the Sun: The Art of Mono-ha. Los Angeles: Blum & Poe, 2012.
