= Gerald Luss =

American architect and designer (died 2025)

- Born: October 7, 1926; Gloversville, New York, U.S.
- Died: April 1, 2025 (aged 98)
- Education: Rensselaer Polytechnic Institute; Pratt Institute (1949)
- Occupations: Architect, industrial designer
- Known for: Time-Life Building interiors; Gerald Luss House

Gerald Luss (7 October 1926 –1 April 2025) was an architect and industrial designer. He is known for his houses, interior spaces, and objects such as furniture and clocks.

== Early life and education ==
Luss was born in Gloversville, New York, and was the son of Jewish immigrants.

During World War II, Luss was stationed in Denver, Colorado where he served in the Army Specialized Training Program, where he studied architecture. After the war, Luss moved to New York City, and graduated from the Pratt Institute with a degree in Industrial design in 1949.

== Career and notable projects ==
After graduating from Pratt, Luss was hired as a designer for the Manhattan-based firm Designs for Business. After spending 17 years working for Designs for Business, Luss started his own firm, Gerald Luss and Associates.

Gerald Luss House

Luss designed the Gerald Luss House, a modernist home in Ossining, New York in 1955. Luss lived in the home until 1959. In season 2 episode 6 of Apple TV+ series Severance, characters ‘Outie’ Burt and his husband Fields live inside the Gerald Luss House.

In 2021, artistic director Abby Bangser and art galleries Blum & Poe and Mendes Wood DM, collaborated to curate an exhibition titled, At the Luss House. In situ at the Gerald Luss House, Luss' clocks and furniture, were juxtaposed alongside work by 18 contemporary artists.

Time & Life building

In 1959, he was commissioned to design the interiors of the Time & Life building, which he did using a modular design system. Luss' designs for the TIme & Life building inspired the sets for the offices of the fictional Sterling, Cooper, Draper & Price in the period drama Television series Mad Men.

Clockmaking

In the early 1980s, Luss started to make ornate clocks, inspired by his travels throughout the United States, Italy, Bogota, Colombia, Paris, France, and London, England. His impetus to begin clock making was that the 24-hour daily cycle is a common denominator across the world's cultures.

In 2020, Luss created a site-specific sculpture and timepiece titled Infinity. According to Luss, Infinity is a "new timepiece conceived and physically positioned to reflect upon the interrelationship with infinity occurring every nanosecond irrespective of location within the universe as currently envisioned.”
