= BLUM =

Art gallery in Japan and the United States

BLUM was a contemporary art gallery located in Los Angeles, Tokyo, and New York.

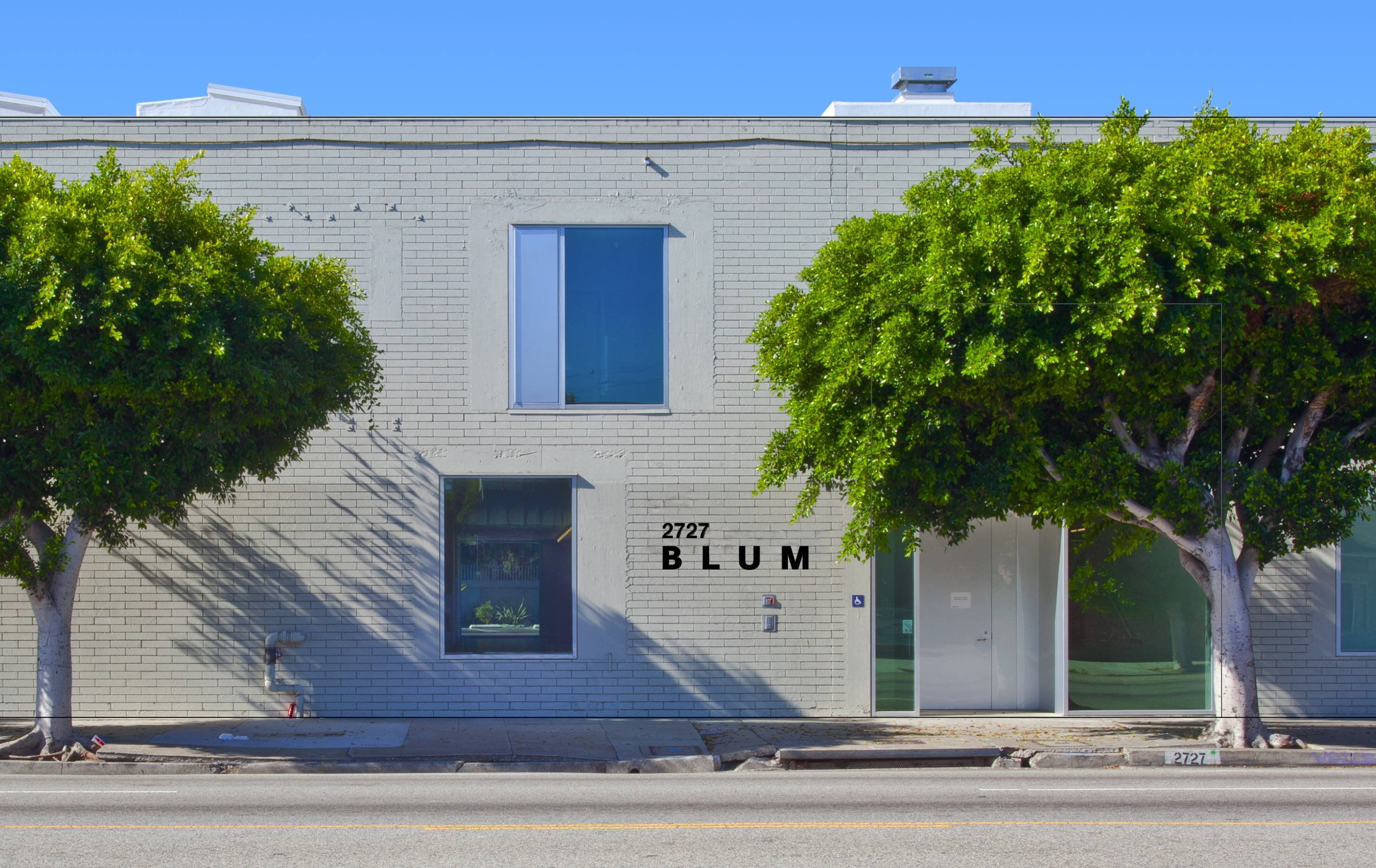
BLUM Los Angeles

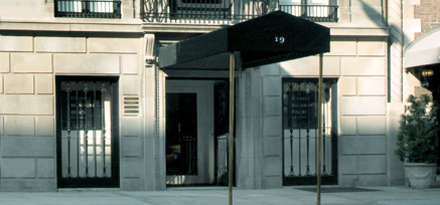
BLUM New York

== History ==
BLUM represents more than sixty artists and estates from sixteen countries worldwide, nurturing a diverse roster of artists at all stages of their practices with a range of global perspectives. Originally opened as Blum & Poe in Santa Monica in 1994, the gallery has been a pioneer in its early commitment to Los Angeles as an international arts capital.

The inaugural exhibition in Santa Monica featured Stroke, an installation by British artist Anya Gallaccio, consisting of chocolate smeared onto the gallery walls.

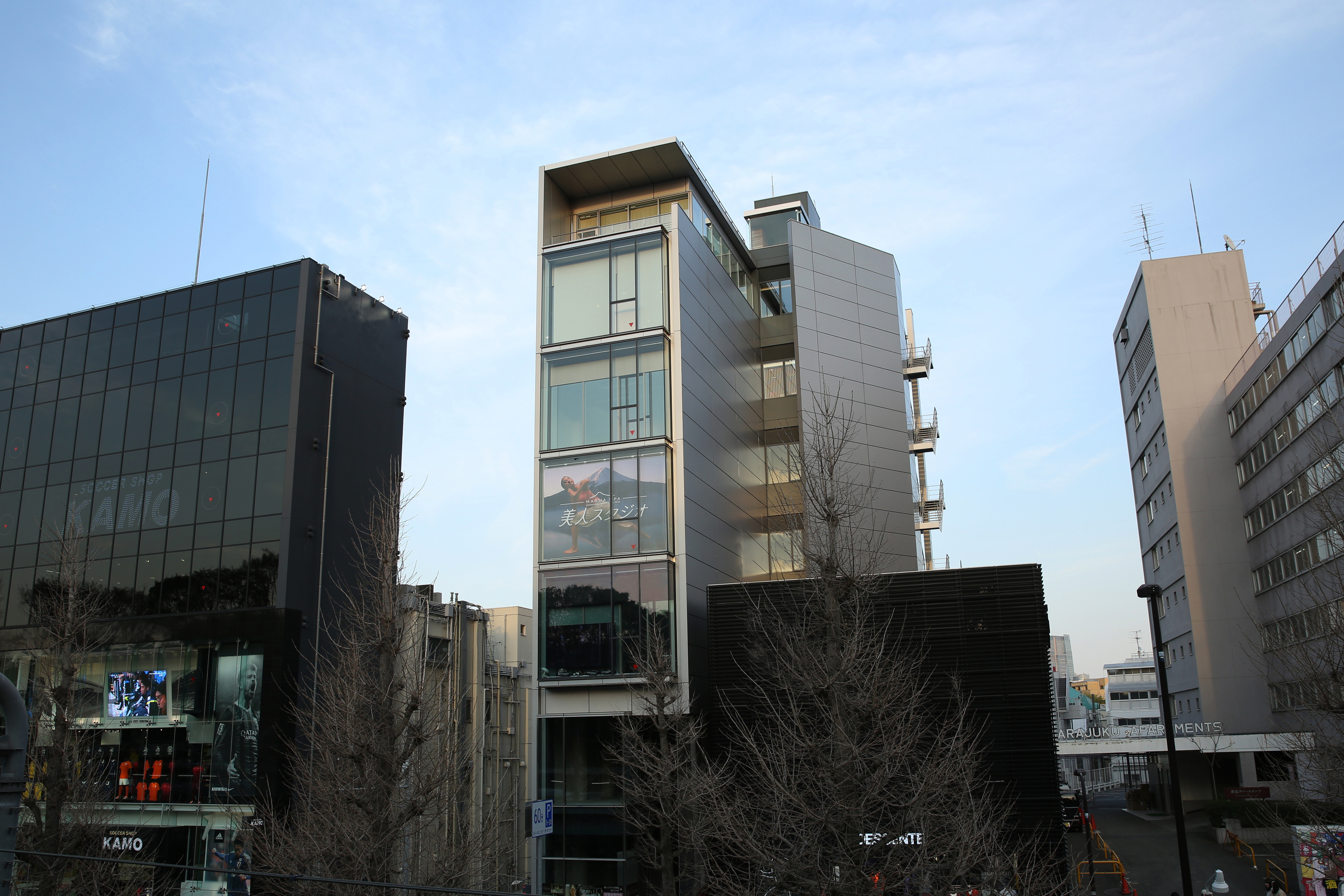
BLUM Tokyo

In 2003, the gallery relocated to a 460 m^{2} (5,000 sq ft) warehouse on the edge of Culver City, an area of industrial warehouses. Several other galleries subsequently opened on the same stretch of La Cienega Boulevard, resulting in the formation of the Culver City Art District.

On its 15th anniversary in 2009, the gallery purchased a 2,000 m^{2} (22,000 sq ft) building across the street on La Cienega Boulevard and renovated it into a series of exhibition spaces on two floors.

In 2014, the gallery opened an exhibition space in a renovated townhouse at 19 East 66th Street, off Fifth Avenue, in New York.

In 2020, Blum & Poe teamed up with art and design fair Object & Thing and Mendes Wood DM gallery to install works by 34 artists and designers—including Alma Allen, Sonia Gomes and Mark Grotjahn—throughout the glassy home of architect and industrial designer Eliot Noyes in New Canaan, Connecticut.

In 2023, Jeff Poe departed the gallery, leaving Tim Blum in charge of the business. At the same time, New York-based Partner Matt Bangser was promoted to managing partner, a newly created position. Despite initial indications that the gallery would retain the name "Blum & Poe", the gallery, shortly thereafter, officially changed its name to BLUM and announced plans to relocate its New York outpost to a 580 m^{2} (6,200 sq ft) space in New York's Tribeca district. In July 2025, Tim Blum announced his decision to step away from his gallery and to close its Tokyo and Los Angeles locations.

== Japanese artists ==
Prior to returning to Los Angeles in 1994, Blum had spent several years living and working in the Tokyo art world. During that time he met Yoshitomo Nara and Takashi Murakami. Blum and Poe visited Murakami's studio in Toyama to see his then newly created Oval Buddha (2007). The massive sculpture was funded through the efforts of the gallerists. Following its opening in Santa Monica, Blum & Poe gave Yoshitomo Nara his first solo exhibition in the United States in 1995. Takashi Murakami's first solo exhibition with the gallery was in 1997.

In January 2010, Blum & Poe held a solo exhibition of Lee Ufan, the influential Korean artist/theorist of Mono-ha, a loose group of Tokyo-based artists who established themselves in the late 1960s. In February 2012, the gallery held "Requiem for the Sun: The Art of Mono-ha", the first survey of Mono-ha in the United States, which included major installations by Kōji Enokura, Noriyuki Haraguchi, Susumu Koshimizu, Lee Ufan, Nobuo Sekine, Kishio Suga, Jiro Takamatsu, and Katsurō Yoshida.

In February to May 2019, Blum & Poe Los Angeles hosted the two-part exhibition "Parergon: Japanese Art of the 1980s and 1990s" curated by Mika Yoshitake, which presented the work of over twenty-five visual artists in an array of media spanning painting, sculpture, duration performance, noise, video, and photography. The exhibition title makes reference to the gallery in Tokyo (Gallery Parergon, 1981-1986) that introduced many artists associated with the New Wave phenomenon, its name attributed to Jacques Derrida's essay from 1979 which questioned the "framework" of art, influential to artists and critics during the period. A catalogue was published alongside the exhibition by Blum & Poe and Skira Editore.

In June 2019, Blum & Poe opened "Vong Co RAHZI", a group exhibition inspired by the influential Japanese visual and music artist 'EYƎ'. It featured a selection of works by EYƎ, known as a pioneer of the Japanese noise genre, and four artists influenced by him. One was Masaho Anotani, who uses his surreal and luminous artworks like a Shaman to communicate what is sacred. There was also Teppei Kaneuji, who re-configures consumer goods for bizarre fantastical sculptures, and the painter of unusual and purposely unrealistic representations of memories, Chihiro Mori. The fourth artist was Tomoo Gokita, who presents cultural archetypes with warped and concealed features in grayscale, monochrome, abstract and figurative paintings and drawings.

In 2021, Blum & Poe partnered with ANOMALY Gallery for the Art Collaboration Kyoto Art Fair, which sought to bridge the distance between the Japanese art scene and the art scene overseas. Artists featured were gathered under the theme society and labour. "We share one artist, Yukinori Yanagi, but we thought the real pleasure would come from collaborating with artists the other gallery has never worked with before", the gallery director at ANOMALY tells Ocula Magazine. Tim Blum has served on the selection committee of Tokyo Gendai as part of a recent effort to forward the contemporary art market in Japan.

== Korean artists (Dansaekhwa) ==
Following the 2010 solo exhibition of Lee Ufan and the subsequent survey of Mono-ha in 2012, Blum & Poe expanded its exploration of the artistic contexts in which Lee Ufan worked. In parallel to his involvement with Mono-ha, Lee had been an influential figure to his peers in Korea, whose works were collectively referred to as Dansaekhwa (monochrome painting).

In September 2014, the gallery held "From All Sides: Tansaekhwa on Abstraction", curated by Joan Kee, Associate Professor of History of Art at the University of Michigan, at Blum & Poe in Los Angeles. Featuring Lee and six other core artists from the movement—Chung Sang-Hwa (Chung Sanghwa), Ha Chonghyun, Kwon Young-woo, Park Seobo and Yun Hyong-keun—"From All Sides" was the first major survey of Dansaekhwa to be held in the United States. Blum & Poe in New York subsequently held Ha Chong-hyun's first US solo show in November 2014, and Yun Hyong-keun's first posthumous US solo show in November 2015.

== Artists ==
BLUM represents numerous living artists, including:

- Alma Allen
- Theodora Allen
- Tom Anholt
- March Avery
- Darren Bader
- Alvaro Barrington
- Lynda Benglis
- Mohamed Bourouissa
- Pia Camil
- Carroll Dunham
- Sam Durant
- Anya Gallaccio
- Aaron Garber-Maikovska
- Tomoo Gokita
- Sonia Gomes (since 2020)
- Françoise Grossen
- Mark Grotjahn
- Ha Chong-hyun
- Kazunori Hamana
- Christopher Hartmann
- Julian Hoeber
- Lonnie Holley
- Yukie Ishikawa
- Oliver Lee Jackson
- Acaye Kerunen
- Susumu Koshimizu
- Friedrich Kunath
- Yukiko Kuroda
- Shio Kusaka
- Kwon Young-woo
- Tony Lewis (since 2018)
- Linder
- Florian Maier-Aichen
- Eddie Martinez
- Paul Mogensen
- Sam Moyer
- Dave Muller
- Kazumi Nakamura
- Etsuko Nakatsuji
- Yoshitomo Nara
- Simphiwe Ndzube
- Asuka Anastacia Ogawa
- Kenjirō Okazaki
- Anna Park
- pascALEjandro
- Solange Pessoa
- Lauren Quin
- Umar Rashid
- Akane Saijo
- Matt Saunders
- Hugh Scott-Douglas
- Peter Shear
- Sebastian Silva
- Penny Slinger
- Agata Słowak
- Kishio Suga
- Ryan Sullivan
- Henry Taylor
- Alexander Tovborg
- Yuji Ueda
- Hiroka Yamashita
- Yukinori Yanagi (since 2019)
- Zhu Jinshi

In addition, the gallery manages various artist estates, including:

- Karel Appel
- JB Blunk
- Robert Colescott (since 2017)
- Thornton Dial
- Kōji Enokura
- Kwon Young-woo
- Sadamasa Motonaga
- Nobuo Sekine
- Yun Hyong-keun

In the past, the gallery has worked with the following artists and estates:

- Takashi Murakami (–2019)

== Branches ==
On its 20th anniversary in 2014, Blum & Poe established two new branches. In May, the gallery opened a gallery in a townhouse on the Upper East Side in New York. In September, Blum & Poe opened a space opposite the Meiji Shrine gardens in central Tokyo.

== See also ==
- Contemporary art gallery
- List of contemporary artists
