= Françoise Grossen =

Swiss artist (born 1943)

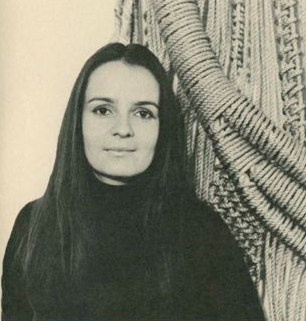
- Françoise Grossen in 1972
- Born: 1943 (age 82–83); Neuchatel, Switzerland
- Education: School of Architecture, Polytechnical University, Lausanne, Switzerland; School of Arts & Crafts, Basel, Switzerland; Master of Arts, UCLA, Los Angeles, CA
- Known for: Sculpture, Fiber art
- Website: http://www.francoisegrossen.com/

Françoise Grossen (born 1943 in Neuchatel, Switzerland) is a textile artist known for her braided and knotted rope sculptures. She lives and works in New York City. Grossen’s work has been acquired by the Metropolitan Museum of Art, New York; the Renwick Gallery, Smithsonian American Art Museum, Washington, DC; and the Art Institute of Chicago.

== Biography ==
Françoise Grossen was born in Neuchatel, Switzerland in 1943. She studied architecture for a year at the Polytechnical University, Lausanne, Switzerland (1962–63) before becoming a textile major at the Kunstgewerbeschule in Basel, Switzerland (1963–1967). In 1963 Grossen spent six months as a French instructor in a professional school in the Democratic Republic of Congo and lived in Gabon for two years, an experience that would influence her later career.

Upon her return from Gabon in 1967, Grossen received her degree in Textile Design from Kunstgewerbeschule. In 1968 she moved to the United States to study with Professor Bernard Kester at UCLA, where she received an M.A. in 1969. Shortly after graduating from UCLA, Grossen moved to New York City to work for Jack Lenor Larsen Inc. It was Larsen who gave Grossen her first show in his showroom on east 59th Street. As her own work and commissions began to take off, Grossen left Larsen Inc. to establish her own studio practice, and to teach workshops at venues around the world. The artist received her American citizenship in 1983, and from 1980 to 2002 Grossen worked and lived in a studio near Almería in southern Spain. In 2002 Grossen returned to New York City, where she continues to live and work.

== Artwork ==
Grossen's work breaks away from the wall, rejecting traditional approaches to textile-based work. The artist is best known for her large architectural sculptures made from materials including manila rope and sisal, most of which hang freely from the ceiling. Travels to Africa influenced the braiding, plaiting and knotting techniques present in many of her works.

Shortly after arriving in the United States, Grossen was included in the seminal 1969 Wall Hangings exhibition at the Museum of Modern Art in New York City, where her large-scale fiber sculptures stood alongside works by contemporaries like Sheila Hicks, Claire Zeisler, Lenore Tawney and Eva Hesse. Around the same time she received international recognition at the IV Biennale International de la Tapisserie in Lausanne, Switzerland. Grossen went on to exhibit at subsequent International de la Tapisserie Biennales (V-VIII). Throughout the 1970s and 80s the artist had solo exhibitions at the Museum Bellerive, Zurich, Switzerland, The Hadler Galleries in New York City, Kaplan Baumann Gallery in Los Angeles, Reed College Art Galleries in Portland, Oregon, and the Musee d'Art et d'Histoire, Neuchatel, Switzerland. Grossen's most recent solo exhibition was at Blum & Poe in New York City, June 4 - August 14, 2015. Recent group exhibitions include Fiber: Sculpture 1960–Present, which was held at the Institute of Contemporary Art, Boston and traveled to the Wexner Center for the Arts, Columbus, OH and the Des Moines Art Center, Des Moines, IA (2014–2015) and Revolution in the Making: Abstract Sculpture by Women, 1947-2016 held at Hauser Wirth & Schimmel, Los Angeles.

Over the course of her career, Grossen has created numerous large scale works for public places, institutions, corporate offices and hotels in New York, Chicago, Washington DC, Boston, Texas, California, and abroad. Her work is in international public and private collections, including the Metropolitan Museum of Art, New York; the Smithsonian Institution, Renwick Gallery, Washington, DC; and the State Hermitage Museum in Saint Petersburg, Russia.

== Selected solo exhibitions ==
- 1968: Jack Lenor Larsen, Inc. Showroom (New York, NY)
- 1969: U.C.L.A. (Los Angeles, CA)
- 1970: San Diego California State College (San Diego, CA)
- 1976: Museum Bellerive (Zurich, Switzerland)
- 1976: Hadler Galleries (New York, NY)
- 1976: Kaplan Baumann Gallery (Los Angeles, CA)
- 1978: Reed College Art Galleries (Portland, OR)
- 1980 Art Institute, Pittsburgh, Pennsylvania
- 1983 Goldstein Gallery, Saint Paul, Minnesota
- 1987: Musee d'Art et d'Histoire (Neuchatel, Switzerland)
- 2015 Françoise Grossen, Blum & Poe, New York (solo exhibition)
- 2016 Contact III, Blum & Poe, Los Angeles

== Selected group exhibitions ==
- 1969: Wall Hangings, Museum of Modern Art (New York, NY)
- 1969, 1971, 1973, 1975, 1977: IV, V, VI, VII, VIII Biennale Internationale de la Tapisserie (Lausanne, Switzerland)
- 1976: Focus on Fiber, Jacques Baruch Gallery (Chicago, IL)
- 1977: The Material Dominant, Museum of Art, Pennsylvania State University
- 1977: Six Europeans/Art in Fiber 1977, The Hadler Galleries Ltd. (Houston, TX)
- 1977: Artistry: Clay & Fiber, Sarah Lawrence College Art Gallery (Bronxville, NY)
- 1977: Fiberworks-The Americas and Japan, National Museum of Modern Art (Kyoto and Tokyo)
- 1977: Fiberworks, Cleveland Museum of Art (Cleveland, OH)
- 1977: Compositions in Fibers, Jacques Baruch Gallery (Chicago, IL)
- 1978: 3rd Textile Triennale (Lodz, Poland)
- 1979: Transformation: UCLA Alumni in Fiber, F.S. Wight Art Gallery, UCLA (Los Angeles, CA)
- 1979: Recent Fiber, University of Akron, Davis Art Gallery (Akron, OH)
- 1979-1980: Weich Und Plastisch, Softsculpture, Kunsthaus (Zurich)
- 1981–1982 San Francisco Museum of Modern Art, San Francisco, California
- 1982 Cooper-Hewitt Museum, New York, New York
- 1982 Metropolitan Museum of Art, New York, New York
- 1986 Indianapolis Museum of Art, Indianapolis, Indiana
- 1986 Maison de la Culture, Montreal, Canada
- 2014: What Would Mrs. Webb Do?: A Founder's Vision, Museum of Arts and Design, (New York, NY)
- 2014-15: Fiber: Sculpture 1960-present, Institute of Contemporary Art, Boston, Wexner Center for the Arts (Columbus, OH), Des Moines Art Center (Des Moines, IA)
- 2016: Revolution in the Making, Abstract Sculpture by Women 1947-2016, Hauser, Wirth & Schimmel (Los Angeles, CA)
- 2016: Tapisseries Nomandes, Foundation Toms Pauli-Collections XXe Siecle Musée Cantonal des Beaux Arts (Lausanne, Switzerland)
- 2024 Making Their Mark: Works from the Shah Garg Collection, Berkeley Art Museum and Pacific Film Archive (BAMPFA).

== Museum collections ==
- The Metropolitan Museum of Art, New York, NY
- Smithsonian Institution, Renwick Gallery, Washington DC.
- Museum of Arts and Design, New York, NY
- Art Institute of Chicago, Chicago, IL
- Minneapolis Institute of Arts, Minneapolis, MN
- Museum of Art, RISD, Providence, RI
- Cleveland Museum of Art, Cleveland, OH
- Racine Art Museum, Racine, WI

== Recognition ==
- 1967–1970 UCLA Art Council Awards
- 1977 The National Endowment for the Arts
- 1981 Women in Design, International Honor Award
- 2016 American Craft Council Award, College of Fellows
