= Gerald Luss House =

Modernist building in Ossining, New York

Coordinates: 41.2047°N 73.8153°W

The Gerald Luss House, a modernist home in Ossining, New York, is a single story, wood and glass residence designed to harmonize with its woodland site. It was designed by American architect, sculptor and furniture designer Gerald Luss in 1955.

Featuring a prominently cantilevered design, the house was then 25-year old Luss's first residential work, and embodied his philosophies on architecture and design, which were at times overshadowed by his corporate interiors. For a time the house served as Luss' private residence. The Luss House integrated environmental harmony and design order into the home, featuring custom steel frames with glass infills and efficient air distribution systems, reflecting Luss's personal and professional and personal aesthetic. Luss, more widely known for his work on the Time & Life Building in New York City, has recently been reassessed as central to American design following the incorporation of his interiors in the set designs for the television series Mad Men. The Luss House was also featured in season two of the Apple TV+ series Severance.

In 2021, an exhibition titled At The Luss House: Blum & Poe, Mendes Wood DM and Object & Thing was held inside the Luss House.
