= Nobuo Sekine =

Japanese sculptor (1942–2020)

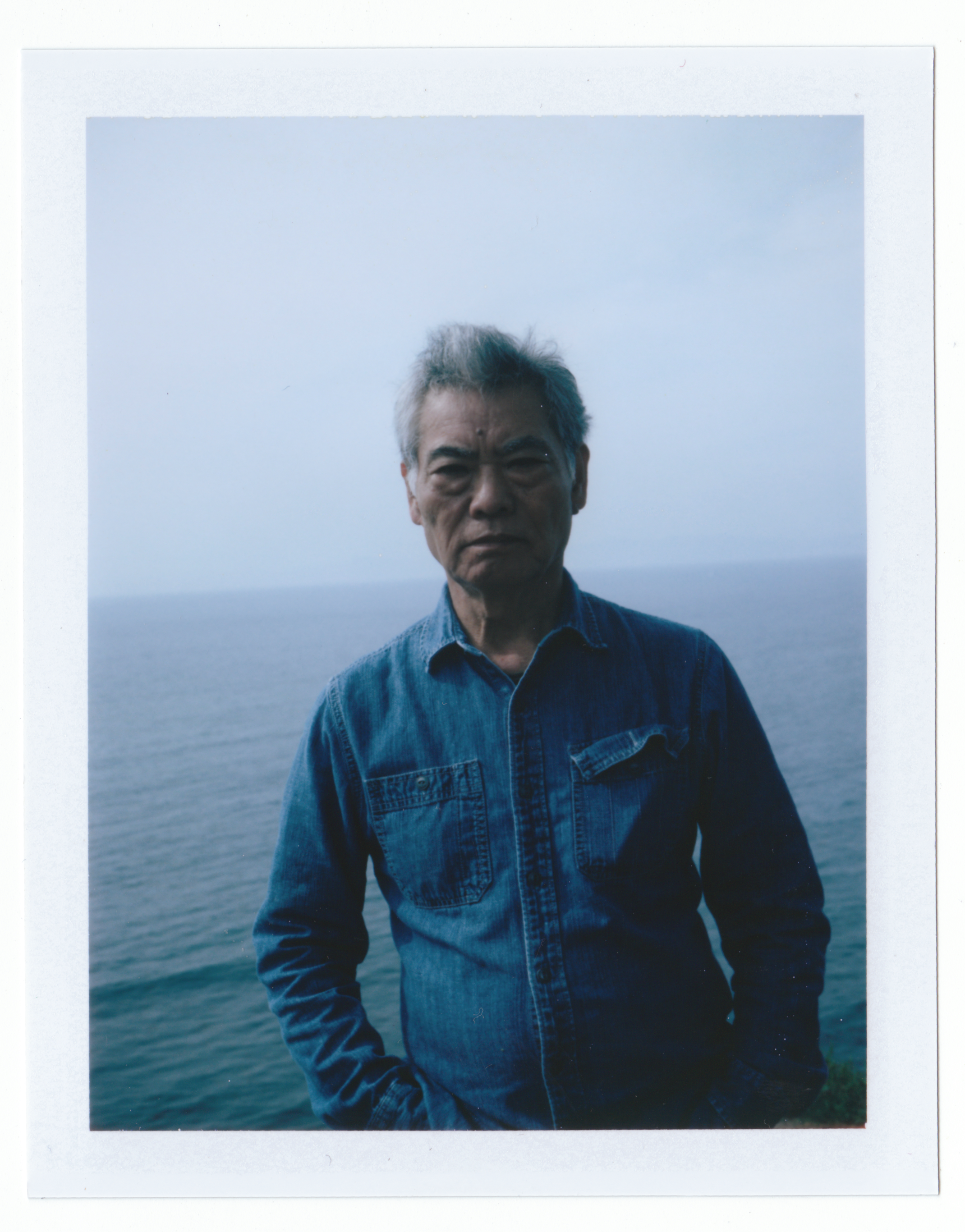
- Artist Nobuo Sekine facing away from the Pacific Ocean, ca. 2014, Palos Verdes Peninsula, CA. Photo: Gaea Woods
- Born: September 19, 1942; Saitama, Japan
- Died: May 13, 2019 (aged 76); Los Angeles, California, United States
- Education: Tama Art University
- Known for: Contemporary Art
- Notable work: Phase-Mother Earth
- Movement: Mono-ha
- Website: http://www.nobuosekine.com

Nobuo Sekine (関根 伸夫, Sekine Nobuo; September 19, 1942 – May 13, 2019) was a Japanese sculptor who resided in both Tokyo, Japan, and Los Angeles, California.

A graduate of Tama Art University, he was one of the key members of Mono-ha, a group of artists who became prominent in the late 1960s and early 1970s. The Mono-ha artists explored the encounter between natural and industrial materials, arranging them or interacting with them in mostly unaltered, ephemeral states.

Sekine’s signature materials included earth, water, stone, oilclay, sponge, steel plates, among others. His Phase—Mother Earth, consisting of a hole dug into the ground, 2.7 meters deep and 2.2 meters in diameter, with the excavated earth compacted into a cylinder of exactly the same dimensions, is considered to have initiated the Mono-ha movement. Later credited as the "big bang" of the movement, the work not only attracted the attention of fellow Tama students but also Lee Ufan, who was senior to Sekine and in search of a theoretical framework for new art. This work led to an intense intellectual exchange between Sekine and Lee, involving other Tama students, that served as a foundational theory of Mono-ha, that combined Sekine’s principle of “not making” (tsukuranai koto) and Lee’s idea of “the world as-it-is” (arugamama no sekai), setting a stage for themselves and their peers to embark on a full-fledged exploration of mono (things), which became the name for their movement. Sekine’s own work rapidly progressed from Phase—Mother Earth to Phase-Sponge (1968) and Phase of Nothingness - Oil Clay (1969), with all of these works receiving top awards at major competitions. By 1970, Sekine established himself as a young but rising figure of contemporary art, being invited, along with Shusaku Arakawa, to exhibit in the Japanese pavilion at the Venice Biennale in 1970, by the critic Yoshiaki Tōno. While Arakawa filled the pavilion’s interior, Sekine erected a large-scale outdoor sculpture, Phase of Nothingness. Despite these attentions, the artist departed the Mono-ha practice and established Kankyō Bijutsu Kenkyūjo (Environment Art Studio) in 1973 to focus primarily on public sculpture.

== Early career ==
Nobuo Sekine was born in 1942 in Shiki City, Saitama Prefecture, Japan. From 1962 to 1968, he was a student in the painting department at Tama Art University in Tokyo, where he studied under influential artist-teachers Yoshishige Saitō and Jiro Takamatsu. Takamatsu’s illusionistic paintings and sculpture were central to the development of the Tokyo art scene at that time, as well as his performances and actions that belong to the anti-art trend (Yamanote Line Incident, and other events of the group Hi-Red Center, which he co-founded).

Sekine’s early work reflected this approach. He was included in the seminal Tricks and Vision: Stolen Eyes group exhibition held at Tokyo Gallery and Muramatsu Gallery in 1968. There, he exhibited Phase No.4 (1968) (位相 No.4), a wall-mounted sculpture. Depending on the angle from which one viewed this work, its cylindrical shape appeared whole or fragmented. Sekine held his first solo exhibition at Tokyo Gallery the following year.

== Phase—Mother Earth ==
Phase-Mother Earth
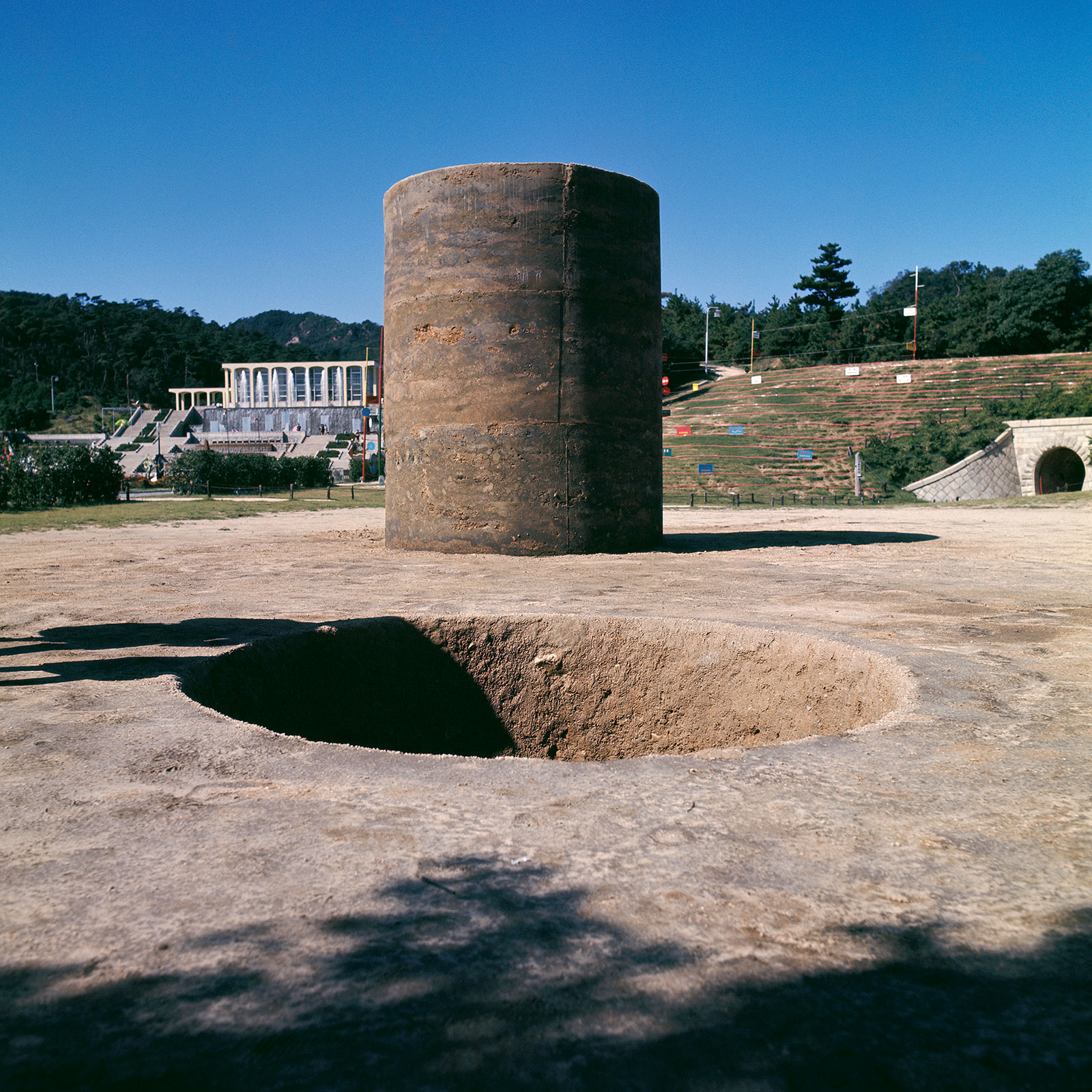
- "Phase—Mother Earth", 1968; Earth, cement Cylinder: 220 x 270 (diameter) cm, hole: 220 x 270 (diameter) cm Installation view at 1st Kobe Suma Rikyū Park Contemporary Sculpture Exhibition; Courtesy of the artist Photo by Osamu Murai
- Artist: Nobuo Sekine
- Year: 1968, 2008 and 2012
- Type: earth art
- Dimensions: 2.7 m × 2.2 m (110 in × 87 in); 2.2 m diameter (87 in)

The major turning point in Sekine’s career came in October 1968, when he created the work Phase: Mother Earth in Kobe’s Suma Rikyu Park for the First Open Air Contemporary Sculpture Exhibition (第一回野外彫刻展). Made with the assistance of Susumu Koshimizu and Katsuro Yoshida, the work consisted of a hole dug into the ground, 2.7 meters deep and 2.2 meters in diameter, with the excavated earth compacted into a cylinder of exactly the same dimensions.

He conceived the work as a “thought experiment” that would deal with the laws of awareness of phases of space—a form of “reasoned thought that deduces whether or not one’s hypotheses are true, and in some cases, can ignore the physical phenomena of reality.” He further elaborated : "If you dig a hole in the earth and keep digging forever, eventually the earth will be like an eggshell, and if you go on to pull out all the earth, it will be reversed into a negative version of itself. "

Despite the simple structure, the act of trying to compact the earth into the desired shape proved technically challenging. Eventually, Sekine consulted a geology laboratory at the University of Tokyo, which advised him to alternate layers of earth with cement, before treading them down firmly.

At the time, Sekine knew virtually nothing about Land Art. Creating a work outdoors was not even his own idea; he merely happened to be invited to participate in an outdoor sculpture exhibition. When Sekine finished the work, however, something unexpected happened: he was simply stunned by the sheer power of the ‘thing’ (mono) before him. The reality of it overwhelmed whatever concepts he originally had in mind. Sekine recently likened it to an ‘accident’ that hit him (and the two other Mono-ha artists who assisted him, Yoshida and Koshimizu Susumu) over the course of a week, though at the time he was unable to put into words the impact he felt. Sekine knew he now faced a different issue, yet his interest continued to centre on topological space.

Lee Ufan shed a light on the ‘accident’ that struck Sekine, Koshimizu and Yoshida :

Since time immemorial, the world is always completely fulfilled ‘as-it-is’, (aragamama). Man, however, cannot see the world that exists as it is ‘as-it-is’, because of the heightened workings of his own consciousness of standing before the world. Look at those ‘idea-obsessed men’ who fuss about in parks everywhere, even in natural landscapes, in their efforts to improve and embellish nature…. They artificially assert their will on things out of a desire to give form, but generally end up all the more objectifying the line between their works and nature. Yet among these goings-on, one lone ‘Happener’ unveiled a near miraculously different world. The sight was almost mythological … as if a giant had ‘carved out’ and ‘deposited’ the earth right there, an altogether amusing shape…. And yet it turns [the earth] into a thing of moving expressiveness that vividly conveys the world ‘as-it-is’.

— Ufan Lee, Sonzai to Mu wo Koete: Sekine Nobuo Ron (‘Beyond Being and Nothingness: On Sekine Nobuo’, Mizue, June 1969, p.52

Phase-Mother Earth is considered to be the initial work of the Mono-ha movement. It was later credited as the "big bang" of the movement.

The work was re-created in 1970 for the Osaka World Expo, in 2008 and again in 2012 for the exhibition Requiem for the Sun: The Art of Mono-ha, Blum and Poe, Los Angeles.

== Other Important Works ==
Phase—Sponge (1968) (位相：スポンジ) was a white cylinder of sponge, distorted under the weight of a black sheet of iron laid on top of it. One can understand from this work that structure remains the same even if there are changes in form, and that what is deformed can be restored to its original shape. Writing about this work, Lee Ufan suggested that “perhaps all primitive people had to do was to stack up rocks like dolmens. However, in today’s industrial society, an iron plate on a sponge cylinder more naturally elicits a response”.

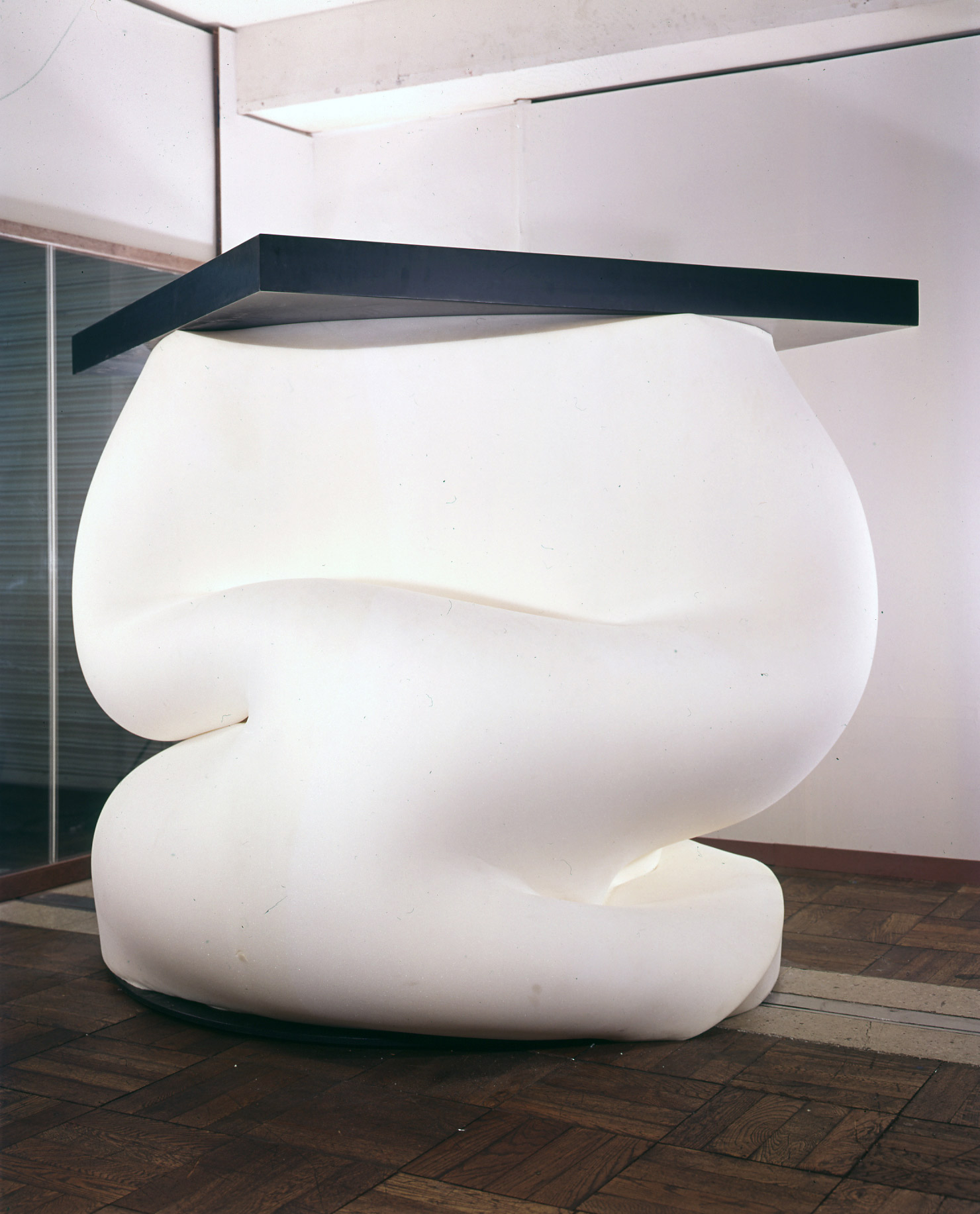
"Phase—Sponge", 1968 Steel plate, sponge 130 x 120 x 120 cm Installation view at 5th Nagaoka Contemporary Art Museum Prize (first prize), Seibu Department Store, Tokyo, November 16–27, 1968. Courtesy of the artist Photo by Eizaburō Hara

At Sekine’s first solo exhibition at Tokyo Gallery in 1969, he exhibited Phase of Nothingness—Oil Clay (1969) (空相—油土), which consisted of a huge mass of oil clay exhibited in its natural state. Viewers were allowed to touch this work and reshape it, implying that sculpted or not, and in contrast to its dominant physical presence, this “sculpture” was transient. Of this piece, curator Simon Groom wrote:

Simply presented in its natural state, the huge mass of clay seems to exist in a constant state of tension between our awareness of its overwhelmingly physical presence and our conscious desire to form it, whether mentally through the profusion of possible forms it may suggest, or physically, drawn as we are to the tactile nature of the material in its infinite malleability.

— Simon Groom, “Encountering Mono-ha”, Mono-ha: School of Things, Kettle’s Yard, p.8, 2001

Phase of Nothingness—Water (1969) (空相：水) consisted of two containers of water, one a 110 cm high cylinder and the other a 30 cm high rectangular box. The containers were painted black so that the water would appear invisible, but as viewers were allowed to touch the work, once they did so, ripples made the presence of the water known.

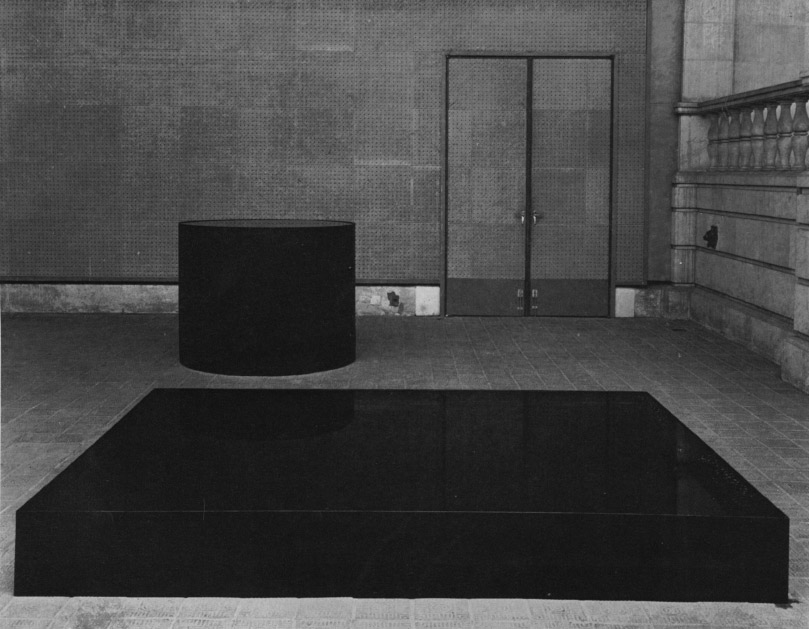
"Phase of Nothingness—Water", 1969 Steel, lacquer, water 30 x 220 x 160 cm, 120 x 120 x 120 cm Installation view at the 9th Contemporary Art Exhibition of Japan, Tokyo Metropolitan Art Museum, May 10–30, 1969. Courtesy of the artist

== Phase Of Nothingness / Venice Biennale ==
In July 1970, along with Shusaku Arakawa, Sekine was chosen to exhibit at the Japan Pavilion at the Venice Biennale. He contributed Phase of Nothingness (空相), which consisted of a large stone placed on top of a tall square column of mirrored stainless steel. The column reflects the surrounding scenery and almost disappears from view, while the stone appears to float in the air. Yoshiaki Tono, commissioner of the Japan Pavilion wrote :

SEKINE has said the artist today does not create anything; he merely brushes off the dust from things, and shows them as they are, not as our prejudices see them. He is scheduled to participate in the International Symposium in the Venice Biennal, at which he is expected to construct a work similar to the one he exhibited at the Hakone Open-Air Museum this last year. It was a square column of mirror steel supporting a huge rock, in such a way that it appeared to float unsupported. The result was that this huge material object was strangely dematerialized and denied.

— Yoshiaki Tono, Nobuo Sekine : the XXXV Biennial international exhibition of art Venice, p.2, 1970

Yoshiaki Tono referred to a roundtable discussion held on the occasion of the Ninth Contemporary Art Exhibit, known as Mainichi-ten that commenced in May 1969 where Sekine mentioned a changing face of art production and renounced the position of the modern subject that has been passed down since the Renaissance period.

Following his experience in Venice, Sekine established the Environmental Art Studio in 1973 to work on public sculpture.

His success at the Venice Biennale led to him being offered a number of solo shows in Europe, including a traveling exhibition featuring a major body of sculptural work, Phase of Nothingness—Black (1978–79)(空相—黒).

== Phase Of Nothingness—Black ==
Phase of Nothingness—Black (1978–79) (空相—黒) is a lesser-known but equally important series, consisting of black FRP sculptures that contrast the natural and the manmade. The approximately 50 sculptures range from rough, clod-like forms that lie low on the floor to highly polished, geometric shapes that stand tall like totems. These works marked a crucial shift in Sekine’s practice—away from a focus on raw materials and malleability and toward the surface qualities of solidified forms. Sekine deliberately made it difficult to identify the material used to create these works—at first glance it is not evident whether they are made of stone, glass, metal, or plastic. When Sekine installed these works, he considered their placement to be a “topological scene” governed by aesthetic principles similar to those found in Zen rock gardens—namely, asymmetric arrangements of disparate elements that combine to represent a broader landscape of seas, islands, and mountains.

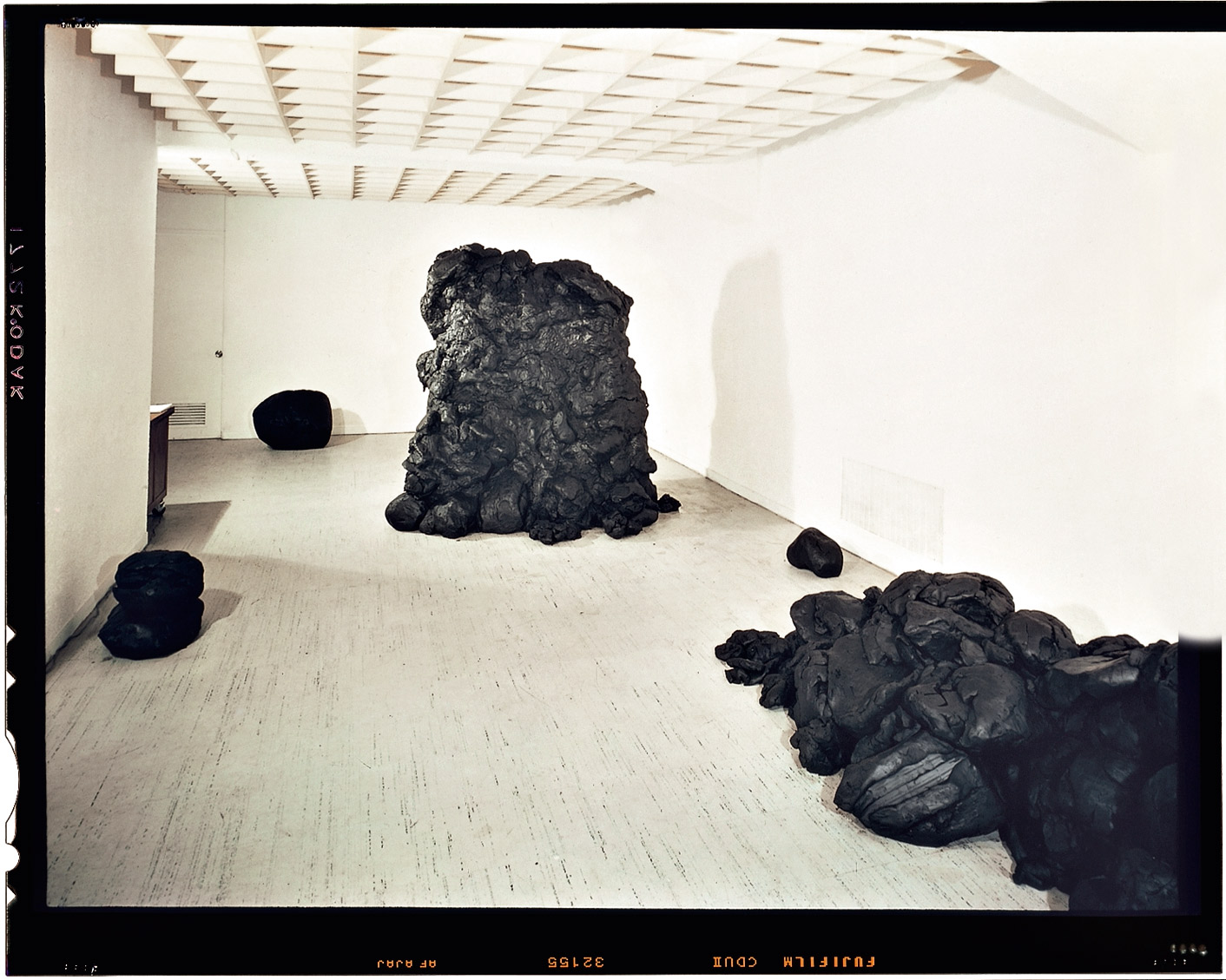
"Phase of Nothingness—Oilclay", 1969, Oilclay Dimensions variable Installation view at Tokyo Gallery, April 18 - May 2, 1969. Courtesy of the artist Photo by Nobuo Sekine

== Intellectual Exchange With Lee Ufan ==
In November 1968, Sekine met the Korean-born artist Lee Ufan, who was soon to be of central importance to Mono-ha and the articulation of its ideas. Lee had studied a variety of philosophies, including the writings of Lao Tzu and Chuang Tzu (which also came to influence Sekine’s work), and after moving to Japan in 1956, had studied modern Western philosophy at Nihon University. Lee recognized the progressiveness of Sekine’s ideas and admired his work, while Sekine found in Lee a theoretician to support his artistic practice and views of art. He knew, from his study of the postwar avant-garde, that a new art like his needed an equally new language in order for him to make a lasting mark in history. Thus, to Sekine, Lee was an answer to his search.

In a series of commentaries that appeared in various art magazines from 1969 to 1970, Lee claimed to have identified the emergence of “a new structure” revealing “the world as it is.” Lee’s theory privileged “things or substances” arranged in a “site” which together produce an “encounter with being,” vividly real and free of subject/object bifurcation. “Sekine’s act, then, does not mean to turn the world into an object of cognition as with the case of objet,” Lee wrote, “but to liberate it amidst non-objective phenomena, into the realm of perception; that is, to let the world be in its own being.”

Lee expands on this porous reciprocity to theorize relationality without a prescribed end, a notion he further refines in his reading of Sekine’s Isō-Daichi (Phase—Earth, 1968) by humorously meditating on a trans-agential entanglement :

Within shigusa, dirt dirts, space spaces, Sekine Sekines, dirt spaces, space dirts, Sekine dirts, dirt Sekines, space Sekines, Sekine spaces.

— Lee Ufan, “Deai o motomete” (In search of encounter), Bijutsu techō 22, no. 324 (February 1970): 116

== Exhibitions ==
Sekine’s first solo exhibition was at Tokyo Gallery in 1969. Since then, he has had numerous solo shows in Japan, including at the Venice Biennale in 1970. Solo exhibitions of his work have been held in Copenhagen, [La Bertesca Gallery] Genova, [La Bertesca Gallery] Milan, Tokyo, and Nagoya.

From 1978 to 1979, “Phase of Nothingness—Black” was the subject of a solo exhibition which toured from the Künsthalle Düsseldorf, Germany, to the Louisiana Museum of Modern Art, Humlebæk, Denmark; the Kröller-Müller Museum, Otterlo, Netherlands; and the Henie-Onstad Art Centre, Høvikodden, Norway.

Sekine has also been included in landmark surveys, such as Reconsidering Mono-ha, National Museum of Art, Osaka, 2005; Japanese Art after 1945: Scream Against the Sky, held at Yokohama Museum of Art, Guggenheim Museum SoHo, New York, and San Francisco Museum of Modern Art, 1994; and Japon des Avant Gardes 1910–1970, Centre Georges Pompidou, Paris, 1986.

Sekine’s work has received renewed attention in the United States following his inclusion in Requiem for the Sun: The Art of Mono-ha, at Blum & Poe, Los Angeles, in February 2012. This exhibition was the first survey of Mono-ha in the United States. Sekine’s work was also featured in Tokyo 1955–1970: A New Avant Garde at the Museum of Modern Art, New York, in 2012. Also, his first solo show in the United States was held at Blum & Poe in January 2014.

Sekine was represented by the galleries Blum & Poe (Los Angeles, New York, Tokyo) and Tokyo Gallery + BTAP (Tokyo, Beijing).

== Death ==
Sekine died on May 13, 2019, in Los Angeles, California, at the age of 76.

== Collections ==
Nobuo Sekine’s work is in the collection of numerous museums, including:

- Hakone Open-Air Museum, Hakone
- Hara Museum of Contemporary Art, Tokyo
- Hiroshima City Museum of Contemporary Art, Hiroshima
- Louisiana Museum of Modern Art, Denmark
- National Museum of Art, Osaka
- Henie-Onstad Art Centre, Norway
- Takamatsu City Museum of Art, Kagawa
- Toyota Municipal Museum of Art, Toyota

== Awards ==
1969
Concour Prize, 1st International Contemporary Sculpture Exhibition, Hakone, Japan Prize
Group Work, 6th Paris Biennale, Paris, France

1968
Concour Prize, 8th Contemporary Art Exhibition of Japan, Tokyo

Asahi Newspaper Prize, Contemporary Sculpture Exhibition, Suma Rikyu Park, Kobe
First Prize, 5th Exhibition, Museum of Contemporary Art, Nagaoka

1967
Commendatory Prize, 11th Shell Art Exhibition, Tokyo

== Bibliography ==
- Chong, Doryun. Tokyo 1955–1970: A New Avant-Garde. New York: Museum of Modern Art, 2012.
- Koplos, Janet. Contemporary Japanese Sculpture. New York: Abbeville Press, 1991.
- Japon des avant gardes: 1910–1970. Paris: Centre Georges Pompidou, 1986.
- Monogatari: Nobuo Sekine Arts Exhibition 1970-2011. Shanghai:Shanghai People’s Fine Arts Publishing House, 2011.
- What is Mono-ha? Tokyo: Tokyo Gallery + BTAP, 2007
- Yoshitake, Mika. Requiem for the Sun: The Art of Mono-ha. Los Angeles: Blum & Poe, 2012.

== Autobiography ==
Sekine, Nobuo. Fukei no yubiwa. Tokyo: Tosho Shinbun, 2006.
