= Mono-ha =

Japanese-Korean art movement

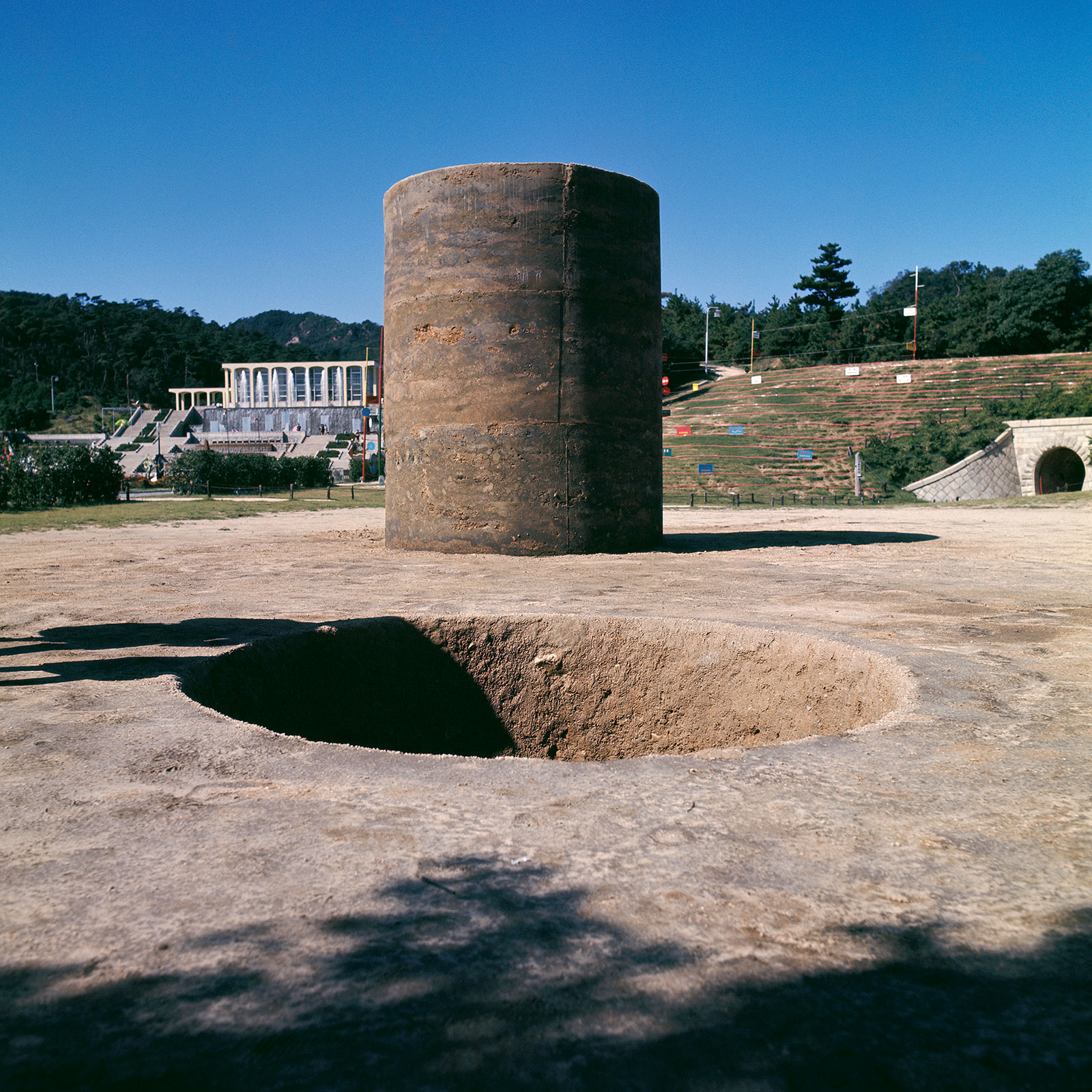
Phase—Mother Earth (1968) by Nobuo Sekine, an influential work in the Mono-ha art movement

Mono-ha (もの派) is the name given to an art movement led by Japanese and Korean artists of the 20th century. The Mono-ha artists explored the encounter between natural and industrial materials, such as stone, steel plates, glass, light bulbs, cotton, sponge, paper, wood, wire, rope, leather, oil, and water, arranging them in mostly unaltered, ephemeral states. The works focus as much on the interdependency of these various elements and the surrounding space as on the materials themselves.

== Origin of the Term “Mono-ha” and its Members ==
“Mono-ha” is usually translated in a literal manner, as “School of Things.” The Mono-ha artists regularly assert that “Mono-ha” was a term disparagingly coined by critics (specifically Teruo Fujieda and Toshiaki Minemura in Bijutsu Techo magazine in 1973) well after they had begun to exhibit their work, and they did not begin as an organized collective. The artists' writings and conversations were published before critics coined the term, including the seminal article by Lee “World and structure—Collapse of the object [Thoughts on Contemporary Art]" in 1969 and the noteworthy artists' round table "Voices of emerging artists: From the realm of Non-Art" published in 1970. Many of the Mono-ha artists were first exhibited at Tamura and Maki Galleries in Tokyo owned by Nobuo(Shinro) Yamagiishi who was also an art writer and whose archives are in the collection of The National Art Center Tokyo.

Toshiaki Minemura explains in his 1986 essay “What Was Mono-ha?,” that in terms of their academic background and intellectual exchange, the Mono-ha artists are divided into three groups:

1. "The Lee + Tamabi Connection.” This comprises Nobuo Sekine, Kishio Suga, Shingo Honda, Katsuhiko Narita and Katsurō Yoshida in the painting department in Yoshishige Saitō's class, and Susumu Koshimizu in the sculpture department at Tama Art University (aka Tamabi) as well as Jiro Takamatsu and Lee Ufan, a Korean artist who is a close friend of Sekine.
2. “The Geidai Connection,” a group of artists around Kōji Enokura and Noboru Takayama, who were both graduates of the Tokyo University of the Arts (aka Geidai), and Hiroshi Fujii and Makoto Habu, who were involved in Mono-ha later on.
3. “The Nichidai Connection,” students from the Nihon University (aka Nichidai) Fine Arts Department—whose central figure was Noriyuki Haraguchi—also known as the “Yokosuka Group,” due to Haraguchi’s upbringing in Yokosuka and his critique of the local US military presence through his work.

== Socio-Political Context ==
Mono-ha emerged in response to a number of social, cultural and political precedents set in the 1960s. With the exception of Lee Ufan, who was a decade older, most of the Mono-ha artists were just beginning their careers when the violent student protests of 1968–69 occurred.

At the same time, there was much protest against the second extension of the US-Japan Security Treaty (known in abbreviated Japanese as Anpo) in 1970, binding Japan into providing logistical support for the US war in Vietnam. Coupled with demands for the reversion of Okinawa by 1972 and the removal of nuclear weapons based there, the climate of protest during this period was symptomatic of a growing distrust of the United States’ intentions towards Asia and its dominant position in the bilateral relationship with Japan. The activism of the “Anpo generation” gave rise to a highly intellectual counterculture that was both critical of US imperialism and acutely self-aware of its Japanese identity.

The Mono-ha artists typically deny involvement with student activist movements at the time, though it is thought that the tense political climate influenced their work, allowing them to grapple with and make sense of their unease and disillusionment with postwar modernity in their different ways.

== Recent Attention in the United States ==
In 2012, Blum & Poe gallery introduced the Mono-ha art into the US with the survey exhibition “Requiem for the Sun: The Art of Mono-ha,” curated by Mika Yoshitake. The gallery has also held solo exhibitions of Lee Ufan, Kishio Suga, Susumu Koshimizu, Koji Enokura, and Nobuo Sekine.

== Phase-Mother Earth ==
Phase-Mother Earth
- Artist: Nobuo Sekine
- Year: 1968, 2008 and 2012
- Type: earth art
- Dimensions: 2.7 m × 2.2 m (110 in × 87 in); 2.2 m diameter (87 in)
- Location: Kobe, Suma Rikyu Park

Nobuo Sekine's Phase-Mother Earth is considered to be the initial work of the Mono-ha movement. Originally created in Suma Rikyu Park in Kobe, and without official permission. The work was re-created in 2008 and 2012. It was a large cylindrical tower made of packed earth, which was removed from a cylindrical hole with the same shape.

== Members ==
- Jiro Takamatsu
- Nobuo Sekine
- Lee Ufan
- Kishio Suga
- Koji Enokura
- Susumu Koshimizu
- Noboru Takayama
- Katsuhiko Narita
- Noriyuki Haraguchi
- Katsuro Yoshida
- Kenji Inumaki
- Shingo Honda
- Keiji Uematsu

== Bibliography ==
- Japon des avant gardes: 1910–1970. Paris: Centre Georges Pompidou, 1986.
- Chong, Doryun. Tokyo 1955–1970: A New Avant-Garde. New York: Museum of Modern Art, 2012.
- Koplos, Janet. Contemporary Japanese Sculpture. New York: Abbeville Press, 1991.
- Munroe, Alexandra. Japanese Art After 1945: Scream Against the Sky. New York: Harry N. Abrams Inc, 1994.
- Yoshitake, Mika. Requiem for the Sun: The Art of Mono-ha. Los Angeles: Blum & Poe, 2012.
- Kishio Suga. Los Angeles: Blum & Poe, 2012
