= Matt Saunders (artist) =

American artist (born 1975)

Matt Saunders (born 1975) is a contemporary artist who is known for his work across diverse media, including painting, photography, video installation and printmaking.

== Life ==
Saunders was born in Tacoma, Washington and grew up in Baltimore, Maryland. After earning degrees from Harvard College (1997, AB, Visual and Environmental Studies). and the Yale School of Art (2002, MFA in Painting and Printmaking), Saunders lived and worked for about a decade in Berlin, Germany before returning to teach at Harvard University, where he is currently Harris K. Weston Associate Professor of the Humanities.

== Work ==
Grounded in a practice of painting, Saunders works in a variety of media, most notably large format photographs produced without a camera, as well as complex installations of hand-painted animated videos, which are projected across canvases and other "screens."

Saunders’ earliest work included ink drawings and oil paintings on mylar, and later a series of "silver paintings" using silver ink and oils. Beginning around 2008 he started the exploration of photography that he continues to this day. In the past several years, Saunders has collaborated with the printmaker Niels Borch Jensen on large-scale and experimental photogravures and etchings from copper plates.

For his photographs, Saunders creates paintings, which he uses as negatives. "Canvas, oil paint, mylar, and related media — what, in other hands, might be framed and put on a wall — become the ‘negatives’ through which light is passed onto photographic paper," explains Rob Colvin for Hyperallergic. These often-unique prints sit provocatively between painting and photography.

In his video installations, Saunders is just as attentive to light and materials, animating "elliptical, often abstract" passages that range freely between representation and abstraction.

Since the beginning of his career, Saunders often references the history of film. "Drawing imagery from his own idiosyncratic photo archive of old cinema and television, Saunders breathes new life into them through a process both labored and tender," writes curator Matthew Thompson. Hamza Walker observes that "[b]ased on Matt Saunders’ work, painting is capable of soliciting from cinema an uncanny dimension of cultural memory." Saunders uses source material in personal and self-reflexive ways. In an article on the artist in Artforum, Lisa Turvey writes: "Saunders’ immediate precursors are, of course, the Pictures-generation artists, and like many of his contemporaries he has internalized their use of photobased, preexisting imagery in the service of a practice unbound by medium or temporality. But he refuses the abjuration of self typical of that art, and closes up the distinction on which it turned." Although often portrait-based, "technique is as much a protagonist as the portraits themselves," and Saunders interrogates the medium of painting through multiple means, in works that can be figurative, landscape or abstract.

== Exhibitions ==
Solo museum and institutional exhibitions include the Renaissance Society, Chicago (2010); Tate Liverpool (2012); Tank Shanghai (2017) and the St. Louis Museum of Art (2017). He has mounted numerous solo gallery exhibitions including with the Marian Goodman Gallery in New York (2015), London (2018) and Paris (2011, 2014, 2016); with Blum & Poe in Los Angeles (2011, 2014) and Tokyo (2016); with Harris Lieberman in New York (2006, 2009, 2010, 2013) and also with Niels Borch Jensen (Berlin), Martin Asbaek (Copenhagen), Analix Forever (Geneva), Almine Rech (Paris) and Grimm Rosenfeld/ Andreas Grimm (Munich). His work has been included in notable group exhibitions in venues such as the Whitney Museum, MassMOCA, San Francisco Museum of Modern Art, Deutsche Guggenheim, Drawing Room (London), Aspen Art Museum, Adams Art Gallery (Wellington, NZ), Presentation House (Vancouver), deCordova Museum (Lincoln, MA), Sabanci Museum (Istanbul), the Prague Biennial 2003 and the 2011 Sharjah Biennial.

Collections: Saunders’ work is found in many public collections including the Museum of Modern Art, Whitney Museum of American Art, Solomon B. Guggenheim Museum, Tate Collection, San Francisco Museum of Modern Art, Hammer Museum, Museum of Fine Arts Boston, St. Louis Museum of Art, Istanbul Modern and the Museum Brandhorst.

Awards: Saunders is the recipient of the 2015 Rappaport Prize, the 2013 Prix Jean-François Prat and a 2009 Louis Comfort Tiffany Foundation award
