= Susumu Koshimizu =

Japanese artist

- Born: 19 October 1944; Uwajima, Ehime, Japan
- Education: Tama Art University
- Known for: Contemporary art
- Movement: Mono-ha

Susumu Koshimizu (小清水 漸, Koshimizu Susumu; born 1944) is a Japanese sculptor and an installation artist.

He is one of the key members of Mono-ha, a group of artists who became prominent in the late 1960s and 1970s. Mono-ha was the name given to a loosely associated group of artists whose work was stridently anti-modernist—consisting primarily of sculptures and installations that incorporated basic materials such as rocks, sand, wood, cotton, glass and metal, often in simple arrangements with minimal artistic intervention. From early on, Susumu Koshimizu's investigation of material and space resulted in some of Mono-ha's most definitive artworks.

Koshimizu's installations and sculptures during the 1960s and 1970s focused on the qualities inherent to but not visible in an object. Yet, he shows concern for the materiality of objects—a desire to expose the fundamentals of sculpture, often revealed through juxtaposition.

In Paper (formerly Paper 2) (1969), he placed a large stone inside an even larger envelope of Japanese paper, open on one side. Viewers were able to look inside and—in the sculptural context of relating interior structure to exterior form—were confronted with the sheer size and solidity of the stone in contrast to the thin membrane of paper that covers it.

Crack the Stone in August '70 consisted of an immense block of granite split in two at the National Museum of Modern Art, Tokyo. At that time, Koshimizu was exploring the fundamentals of sculpture without the need for juxtaposition: splitting open the stone and exposing its inside was a means to show the materiality and presence of the rock itself. At the beginning of the 1970s, Koshimizu started to explore specifically the structure of surfaces. A single installation, "From Surface to Surface (Wooden Logs Placed in a Radial Pattern on the Ground)" (1972/2004) is a good example. The work is composed of thirty, thirteen-foot-long square beams of wood, the surfaces of which have been sliced at varying intervals and angles to create undulating expanses of geometric form.

Koshimizu's work since the 1980s has explored a variety of Japanese woods though the concept of "working tables.”

== Exhibitions ==
Susumu Koshimizu's first solo exhibition was at Tamura Gallery in 1971. He represented Japan at the Venice Biennale in 1976 and 1980. Koshimizu has also been included in landmark surveys, such as "Reconsidering Monoha", National Museum of Art, Osaka, 2005; "Japanese Art after 1945: Scream Against the Sky", held at Yokohama Museum of Art, Guggenheim Museum Soho, New York, and San Francisco Museum of Modern Art, 1994; and "Japon des Avant Gardes 1910–1970", Centre Georges Pompidou, Paris, 1986. Koshimizu's work has received renewed attention in the United States following his inclusion in "Requiem for the Sun: The Art of Monoha", at Blum & Poe, Los Angeles, in February 2012. This exhibition was the first survey of Monoha in the United States. Koshimizu work was also featured in Prima Materia at the Punta Della Dogana, Venice, in 2013. Also, his first solo show in the United States was held at Blum & Poe in February 2013. He has been constantly exhibiting at galleries and museums in Japan and overseas, including Kizahashi no Niwa (2015, Gallery Yamaki Fine Art). Susumu Koshimizu is represented by the galleries Blum & Poe (Los Angeles, New York, Tokyo), Tokyo Gallery + BTAP (Tokyo, Beijing), and Gallery Yamaki Fine Art (Kobe).
