= Lee Ufan =

Korean artist

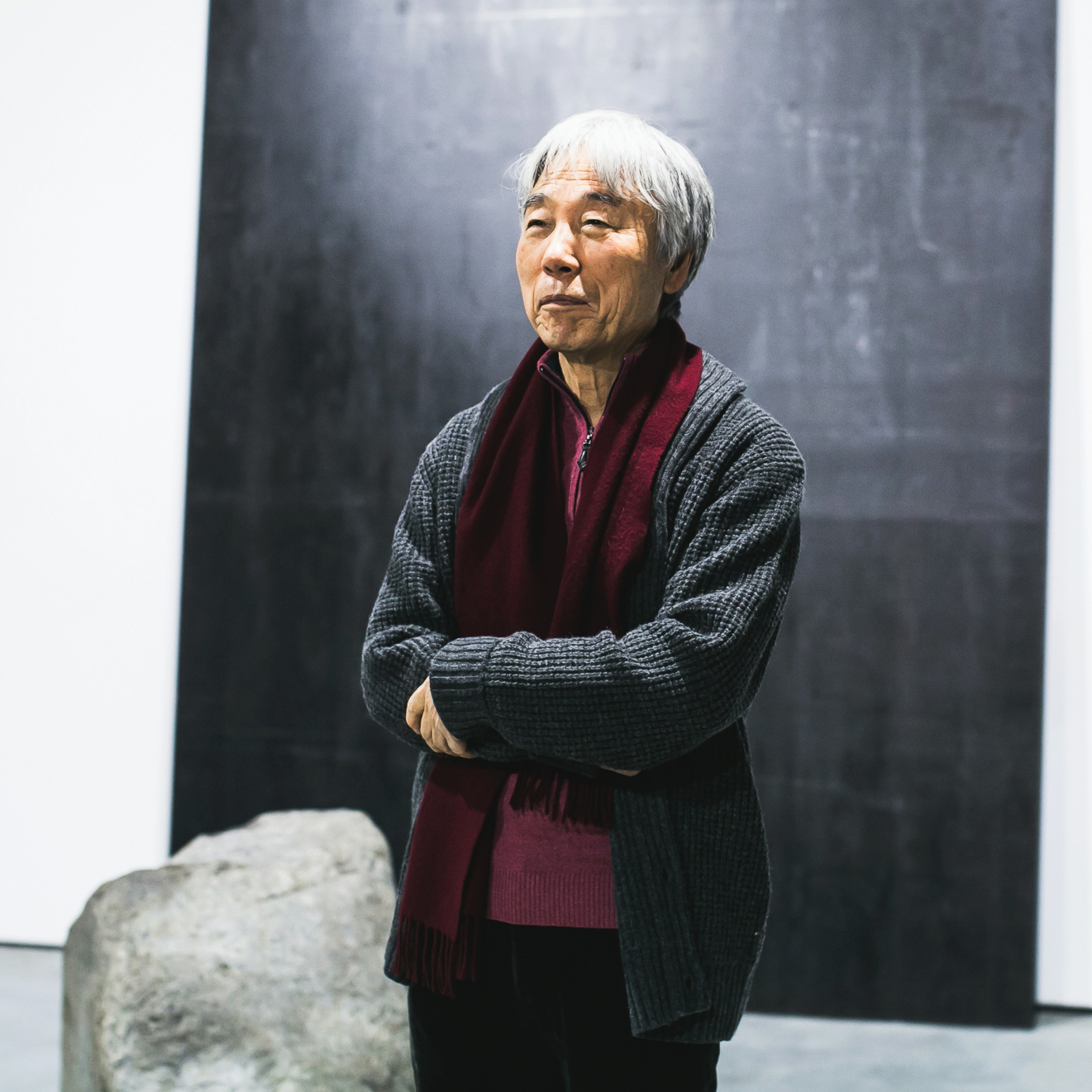
- Born: June 24, 1936 (age 90); Haman County, Korea, Empire of Japan
- Education: Nihon University
- Movement: Mono-ha
- Awards: Legion of Honour; Praemium Imperiale

- Lee Ufan
- Hangul: 이우환
- Hanja: 李禹煥
- RR: I Uhwan
- MR: I Uhwan

Lee Ufan (Korean: 이우환; Hanja: 李禹煥, Korean pronunciation: [iːuhwan]; born 1936) is a South Korean minimalist painter, sculptor, and academic, known for innovative bodies of work emphasizing process, materials, and the experiential engagement of viewer and site, and critiques of European phenomenology.

Having lived and worked in Japan for much of his professional life, Lee has been honored by the Japanese government for having "contributed to the development of contemporary art in Japan." His essay "Sonzai to mu wo koete Sekine Nobuo ron (Beyond Being and Nothingness – A Thesis on Sekine Nobuo)" is largely considered an originator of thought for the post-war Japanese art movement of Mono-ha ("School of Things") in the late 1960s and early 1970s. His writings, published in rapid succession from 1969, have sought to externalize the interface between ideas and sensibilities from the West, namely Western Europe and the United States, and those found in East Asia. Many commentators stress Lee's stated desire to escape, or refute, Western ideas of signification, for example.

As the main theorist of the Mono-ha movement in Japan, Lee was trained as a philosopher. As a painter, Lee contributed to "Korean Monotone Art" (Dansaekjo Yesul, 單色調 藝術), the first artistic movement in 20th century Korea to be promoted in Japan. His work largely advocates for a methodology of de-westernization and de-modernization in both theory and practice as an antidote to the Eurocentric thought of 1960s postwar Japanese society. A self-proclaimed wanderer and lifelong cultural border-crosser, Lee divides his time between Kamakura, Japan, and Paris, France.

== Education and professional activity ==
Born in Haman-gun, Gyeongsangnam-do in 1936, Lee Ufan grew up during the period of Japanese colonization of Korea. Raised by his parents and Confucian grandfather, Lee's first exposure to visual art was through inkbrush painting, in which he received instruction as a child, and later as a high school student in Seoul. He states in a 2015 interview: "At that time in Korea, and also in Japan, there was a tradition, especially in old fashioned families, in which boys were given personal education at home. This included painting, calligraphy, and the reading of Chinese classics. But this was part of the general culture of a civilized man. By doing calligraphy, you learnt how to write, by drawing and reading literature we gained our culture."

Lee states that he had always favored literature over painting and was a bookworm by nature, reading extensively in a wide variety of fields, including philosophy, culture, and art. Nonetheless, in 1956, Lee began studying painting at the College of Fine Arts at Seoul National University, one of Korea's most prestigious schools of higher learning. Shortly after enrolling, Lee's father asked him to travel to Japan to take some medicine to an uncle, who was unwell. Once there, Lee's uncle suggested that he stay and study literature and philosophy at a Japanese university. After only two months at Seoul National University, Lee withdrew and moved to Yokohama, Japan, in 1956, where he earned a degree in philosophy with a special interest in the work of Martin Heidegger in 1961 at Nihon University, Tokyo. After graduating from Nihon University, Lee threw himself against the South–North unification movement and the military regime. In 1964, Lee was arrested and tortured by the Korean Central Intelligence Agency (KCIA).

Lee spent his early working years pursuing a career as an art critic, philosopher, and artist. He had his first solo exhibition at the Sato Gallery in Tokyo in March 1967 and a large-scale show of contemporary Korean painting at the National Museum of Modern Art in Tokyo the following year. In 1969, Lee wrote the essay "From Object to Being," applying his philosophical principles to aesthetic concerns, which was then counted as one of the major critical studies opening up an international dialogue for Japanese modern art. In it, he first wrote of his desire to present "the world (sekai) as it is." Closely bound to this idea was that of the "encounter" (deai), or the point at which human beings initiated a relationship with the material world. Transposed onto the experiences of showing and viewing art, Lee's emphasis on the encounter demanded a reallocation of agency between the artist and the viewer. In lieu of a schematic whereby the artwork passively transmits the artist's intention to the equally passive viewer, the artwork is activated only upon the viewer's sustained engagement with the terms of its material and physical presence.

The year after "From Object to Being," Lee published a collection of critical pieces as the manifesto-like anthology "In Search of an Encounter," which was published in the art journal Bijutsu techō (Art Notebook) accompanying a seminal Mono-ha roundtable, and was fervently embraced by young Japanese artists while sparking off a "Lee Ufan fever" in Korea. Though he has won recognition for large critical essays, other smaller works include "Snake" and "The Acropolis and the Pebble," appearing in his essay collection The Swift Current of Time, elaborate casually on random thoughts and insights gleaned from everyday life. These texts have frequently been taught in Japanese high school textbooks.

Significant for Lee's thinking around the encounter and systems of power were the writings of Michel Foucault, popular among Japanese intellectuals in the late 1960s and after. In March 1969, Lee won a writing competition sponsored by the major Japanese art publishing house Bijutsu Shuppansha for new critics. Then, during the Ninth Contemporary Art Exhibition of Japan held at the Tokyo Metropolitan Art Museum in May of that year, he won a prize for his work Words and Things. Consisting of three enormous pieces of paper laid flat on the exhibition surface, the title of the work was a direct allusion to Michel Foucault's Les mots et les choses (The Order of Things). While he studied philosophy, Lee began painting in a restrained, traditional Japanese style, eschewing the expressive abstraction of the contemporary Japanese Gutai movement. Elements of this approach, particularly the attention to surface, and Lee's investment in Korean Dansaekhwa, were later crucial in forming the ideas of Mono-ha in the late 1960s and early 1970s.

In the 1960s, Lee began teaching at an independent art school called "B-Semi" (Contemporary Art Basic Seminar) run by the abstract painter Kobayashi Akio. During this time, Lee was primarily interested in bodily perception and in the stages leading up to an artwork. Careful to place his emphasis on "things" rather than "concepts," he would have his students ponder the movement of their hand, the possibilities of gestures, or the perception of phenomena while grasping a pencil, crushing paper, or twisting clay, as well as the dynamics of one's relationship to space (outdoor/indoor, public/living). Lee's own theories would also take cues from an understanding of the writings of Belgian mathematician and philosopher Jean Ladrière, whose decidedly phenomenological bent cohered well with Lee's other philosophical sympathies that encompass Nishida Kitarō's theories of bashō (place) and mu (nothingness), and the emphasis on perception espoused by Merleau-Ponty.

Lee's position in the philosophy department at Nihon University in Tokyo earned him a distinguished role as the movement's spokesman. In 1973, he was appointed Professor of Tama Art University in Tokyo and he stayed there until 2007. Lee has since served as Professor emeritus at Tama Art University. Japanese artist and photographer Yoshio Itagaki was famously one of his students from 1989 to 1991. Lee, not only due to his artistic practice but owing as well to the translation of his writings into French, has maintained a high profile particularly in France and Germany, where he has spent half his time since the 1980s.

== Mono-Ha ==
While in Japan, Ufan became an active participant in the countercultural upheavals surrounding the Anpo Movement of the 1960s. Lee also began first exhibiting artwork in Japan in the late 1960s, during which time he came to prominence as one of the founders and theoretical leaders of the avant-garde Mono-ha group. Lee's professional success in Japan additionally overlapped with a period of the 1970s described retrospectively as fukakujitsusei no jidai, or the "age of uncertainty," a term borrowed from economist Kenneth Galbraith's book of the same name. Lee describes the period of hyper-accelerated industrialization in Europe as well as Japan in the second half of the 1960s, the May 1968 student protests in Paris, and the countercultural movement in New York around 1967 and 1968 as catalysts for discussions regarding artistic production and the act of making. He states in a 2014 interview: "We believed that the unmade needed to be introduced, rather than something that was made. To give you an example, a rock, a natural stone, is not made, but can be as old as the earth. So in an effort to break away from the conventional way of thinking that concentrated solely on making and look at things anew, we asked: how does bringing in the unmade open up a new dimension of expression and change both the made and the unmade? That movement became Mono-ha." This movement coincided with Arte Povera in Europe and Minimalism in the U.S., and as such, Ufan sees Mono-ha as Japan's version of an internationally responsive contemporary art movement.

In 1970, Lee moderated a seminal roundtable discussion with artist Sekine Nobuo, and Tama Art University colleagues Koshimizu Susumu, Narita Katsuhiko, Suga Kishio, and Yoshida Katsuro titled "Mono Opens a New World." This roundtable accompanied the publication of Sekine Nobuo's Phase—Mother Earth (1868), considered the first Mono-ha artwork, in Bijutsu techō, in a section titled "Voices of Emerging Artists: From the Realm of Non-Art." The feature also included Lee's seminal text "In Search of Encounter." In its theoretical principles, the Mono-ha school of thought rejected Western notions of representation, choosing to focus on the relationships of materials and perceptions rather than on expression or intervention. The movement's goal was to embrace the world at large and encourage the fluid coexistence of numerous beings, concepts, and experiences. These multiple writings by Lee are understood as a theoretical crux of the Mono-ha, which had then rocketed into prominence after the exhibition Aspects of New Japanese Art was held at the National Museum of Modern Art in Tokyo in 1970. With this impetus, Mono-ha congealed with the participation of the students of the sculptor Yoshishige Saitō, who was teaching at Tama Art University at the time. During this time, Tamura Gallery, a rental gallery that showcased Mono-ha's experimental works, displayed Lee's System A and System B, two works that paired cotton with rocks or stainless steel bursting out of a cube, alongside works by Mono-ha colleagues such as Suga Kishio and Haraguchi Noriyuki. Through their pedagogy and experiments, Lee and fellow Mono-ha artists shared an attitude toward phenomena that was tested through serial composition, emphasizing the development of works over time.

== Works ==
Lee's early work dealt in fundamental questions of painting and sculpture, namely materiality, mark-making, and the role of the frame. Often these center on the artwork without the artist, in which the viewing encounter, rather than the artist's background or intentions, takes priority. Lee's method frequently involves painting with his canvas on the ground to avoid indeliberate drips while making the art-making process challengingly embodied. Lee often also mixes ground stone into his paints to give them more body and gradation. Lee's paintings are considered to evoke, but also refuse, the gestural spontaneity of Abstract Expressionism, while also being reminiscent of Korean munjado, a form of calligraphy where gesture and the materiality of line work against the demands of representation.

Though originally trained as a painter, Lee temporarily forsook painting 1967 in order to produce a series of time-based works to which he initially gave the title Phenomenology and Perception, in direct reference to Maurice Merleau-Ponty's The Phenomenology of Perception. Later, these works were re-titled Relatum. Emphasizing the relationship between objects, these works consisted of various combinations of materials, including rocks, metal sheets, glass plates, and cotton. For example, in a work titled Relatum, first produced in 1968 and reproduced in 2010, Lee dropped a rock from a small height on to a square mirror laid over a steel plate. By allowing the force of gravity to form part of the creative process, the result was opened to chance and the artist's subjectivity was eclipsed, with the cracks in the mirror coming to resemble a form of automatic drawing. In another work, formerly titled Things and Words (1969), three large sheets of blank paper were left in a public plaza to blow about in the wind, inviting the natural forces to co-author the installation, in a dialogue of the human and non-human.

However, some of Lee's most representative work began with the early painting series From Point and From Line (1972–84), first exhibited in 1973 at the Tokyo Gallery under Yamamoto Takashi, who was known for promoting the latest in Japanese, European, and American contemporary art. These works were on view along with Lee's earlier series, From Notch, which made its public debut at the Shirota Gallery in Tokyo in November 1971. In these early paintings, Lee combines ground mineral pigment with animal-skin glue, characteristic of nihonga painting in which he was trained. Each brushstroke is applied slowly and is composed of several layers. Where the brush first makes contact with the canvas, the paint is thick, forming a "ridge" that gradually becomes lighter. The artist refers to this fading as yohaku, or the art of emptiness. The From Line paintings carried out this process using an ordered series of cascading lines, the brush being drawn down the canvas until the paint was spent, whereas in the From Point works he adopted a similar method in order to produce a fading series of small, discrete, rectangular brushstrokes.

These works, with each stroke unique and unidentical to the others, centers the instability of the body as opposed to the machine in an age of mechanical reproduction. One of the first reviews of the 1973 exhibition was written by critic Fujieda Teruo for Bijutsu techō. In his review, Fujieda asserted that the only real significance of these works lay in their evocation of "action and process." He read From Line as the depiction of lines against an upright support, with its "yellowish" canvas as effective in assisting the artist in his chosen task of depicting an image to be seen by an equally upright viewer. Lending an alternative interpretation on the work was the Japanese art critic Minemura Toshiaki, who argued that the paintings needed to be seen durationally, as a depiction of time, rather than records of spatial placement. Though he never actually used the term, Minemura's interpretation strongly implied the From Line and From Point series to be more akin to video-based works, rather than to the medium of painting. Using the word "flow," Minemura reads the lines and points of Lee's works as a virtual representation of water, wherein the images are not so much important as is their movement. According to Minemura, this movement made the passage of time completely transparent.

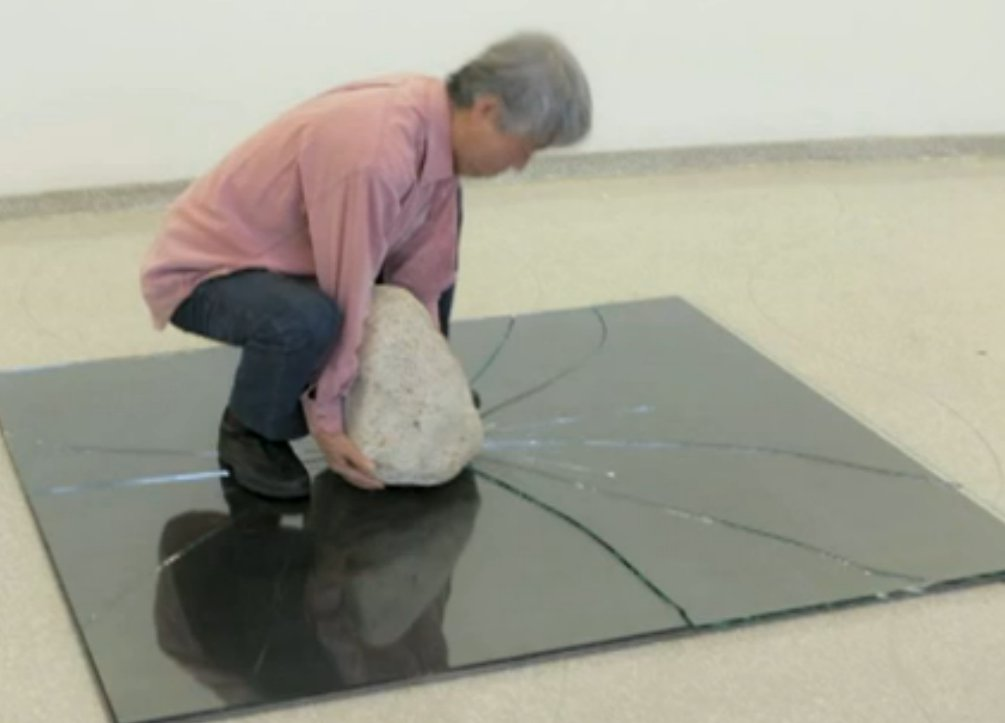
Lee setting up one of his sculptures at the Guggenheim in 2011

In sculpture, Lee explored similar formal interests using minimal means: typically, he favored stone and sheets of iron, though he employed cotton, glass and wood during the Mono-ha period. Beginning in 1972, Lee would rename all of his sculptural works kankeikõ or "relatum," signaling an ongoing pursuit to activate the relation between visible and invisible structures. The installation series title Relatum refers to a visual and sensory concept of the relationship between seemingly opposing materials, juxtaposing flat upright iron screens or glass panes against a collection of flat horizontal stones. This concept is typical of many later works. For example, Relatum – The Shadow of the Stars (2014) is an outdoor arrangement of seven stones on a circular bed of white gravel in which Lee experiments philosophically with shadow as an artistic medium. Lee's sculptures, presenting dispersed arrangements of stones together with industrial materials, recast the discrete object as a network of relations based on parity between the viewer, materials, and site.

In the mid-1970s Lee introduced Korean five artists whom called later Dansaekzo Whehwa (Monotone Painting) school to Japan, which offered a fresh approach to abstraction by presenting repetitive gestural marks as bodily records of time's perpetual passage. In 1991 Lee began his series of Correspondence paintings, which consist of just one or two grey-blue brushstrokes, made of a mixture of oil and crushed stone pigment to intensify the color, applied onto a large white surface. On average, Lee states that his paintings take a month to finish, on canvases that typically measure about 60 by 90 inches, although they can vary in size from a few inches to 10 feet per side. As such, he completes no more than 25 works per year. These works reflect Lee's concept of the "art of encounter," which plays out in the negotiation between formal control and unpredictable nature of the minerals, and is dramatized by the artist's emphasis on gesture and its self-extinction.

In Lee's Dialogue series from about 2006 to present, he uses very large flat-end paintbrushes and mixes mineral pigment with his paint to feature singular, often square brushstrokes on large canvases. Though what appear to be singular brush marks in these works are the result of repeated layering of paint. These works depart from familiar "norms" of Western painting is in the "figure" of the brushstroke isolated against the large blank background of the canvas.

Lee continues to write on contemporary issues. His most recent text, titled, “The Message of the New Coronavirus,” was written in April 2020, shortly after the outbreak of the pandemic. In it, Lee uses reflections on living entities and interrelationship to consider the virus as an ally and nonhuman message.

== Exhibitions ==
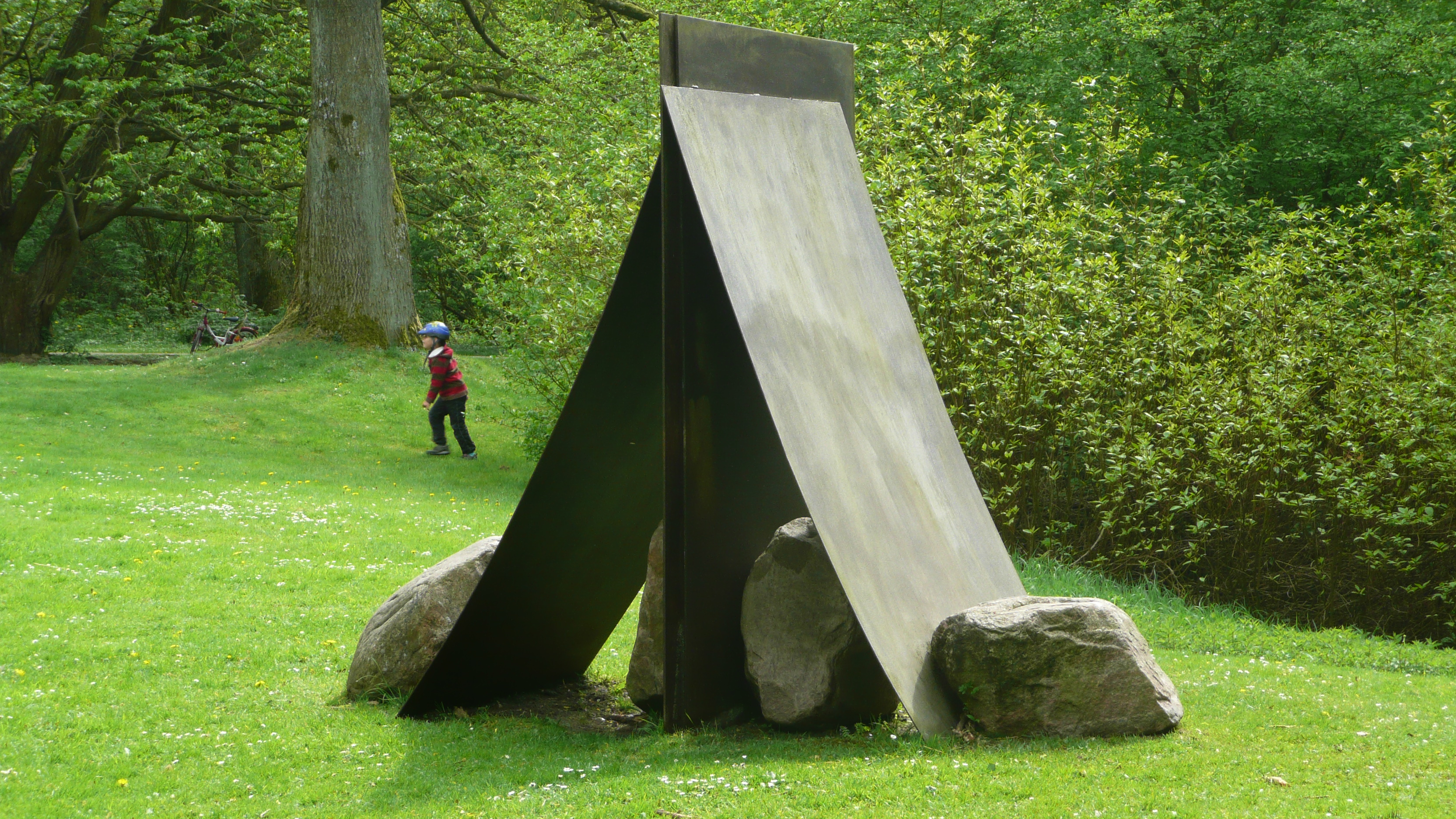
Lee Ufan Relatum with four stones and four irons, 1978

From his first solo exhibition in Japan in 1967, Lee Ufan was invited by Manfred Schneckenburger to participate in Documenta VI (1977) in Kassel, Germany, and in 1969 and 1973 he represented Korea in the Bienal de São Paulo. In 1971, Lee was chosen as one of the representatives of Korea to the Paris Biennale. His contribution to the 1971 Biennale consisted of a Relatum piece in which a rubber mat was held down and stretched by three strategically placed rocks. The first scholarly overview of Mono-ha was written in 1978 by critic Minemura Toshiaki for Bijutsu techō's thirtieth anniversary issue. Following its publication, Minemura began preparing the first official exhibition on Mono-ha as a historical artistic movement in 1986 at Kamakura Gallery in Kanagawa Prefecture. The exhibition, entitled Mono-ha, was divided into three parts and included Lee as well as nine other colleagues. Lee's work was included in the 1992 Tate Liverpool exhibition, Working With Nature: Traditional Thought in Contemporary Art from Korea, the first major survey of Korean art shown in the U.K. In 1997, Lee had a solo exhibition at the Jeu de Paume, Paris, and in 2001 the Kunstmuseum Bonn held a major retrospective of his work. Major exhibitions of Lee's painting and sculpture were later held at the Yokohama Museum of Art in 2005 and the Musée d'art Moderne Saint-Etienne in France in December 2005. The Situation Kunst (für Max Imdahl), a museum associated with Ruhr University Bochum in Germany, opened in 2006 with a gallery devoted to a permanent installation of Lee Ufan's paintings and a garden of his sculpture. However, it was Lee's Resonance exhibition at Palazzo Palumbo Fossati during the 2007 Venice Biennale that won him critical acclaim and a wider audience.

In 2011, Lee Ufan: Marking Infinity was exhibited at the Solomon R. Guggenheim Museum in New York City, organized by curator Alexandra Munroe, with over 90 works, from the 1960s to the present. This marked his first major retrospective in the United States. For the exhibition, Lee recreated Phenomena and Perception B (1969/2011), a performance piece in which he drops a large rock onto glass plates, shattering them. The work was included in a group show, Japanese Art After 1945: Scream against the Sky, also organized by Munroe in 1995 at the short-lived SoHo branch of the Guggenheim. It was the first show in North America to address Mono-ha. Marking Infinity at the Guggenheim also featured Lee's writings on aesthetics and contemporary art as wall texts explaining the philosophy of his work. The art critic Robert C. Morgan wrote on Marking Infinity for The Brooklyn Rail, stating, "What makes Lee Ufan's work exhilarating is the structure—not in the pragmatic sense, but in the virtual/tactile sense; that is, the manner in which the 'weight' comes down to the gravity of seeing: we see and touch the work, less in actuality than conceptually." In 2011, “Young Sook Park and Lee Ufan: Pure Clay,” at TH Gallery in New York commemorated the collaboration between Lee and ceramacist, Young Sook Park.

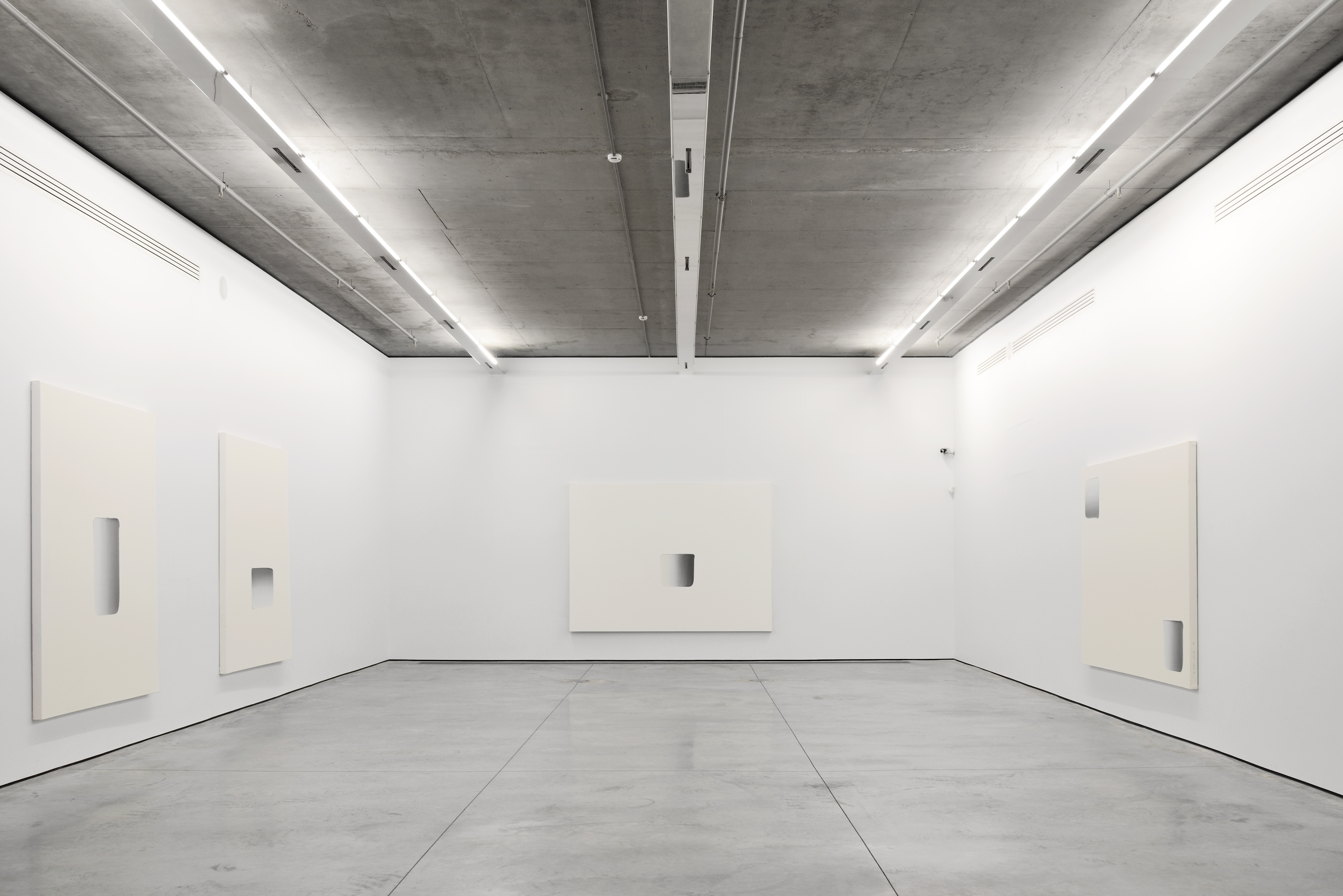
Personal exhibition by Lee Ufan at Gary Tatintsian Gallery in 2014/15

In 2014, Lee was the seventh guest artist selected for the contemporary art program of the Palace of Versailles, following Jeff Koons in 2008, Xavier Veilhan in 2009, Takashi Murakami in 2010, Bernar Venet in 2011, Joana Vasconcelos in 2012, and Giuseppe Penone in 2013. In 2019, Lee became the first single-artist to take over the entire plaza of the Hirshhorn Museum and Sculpture Garden in the museum's 44-year existence. The exhibition, titled Lee Ufan: Open Dimension, took shape around 10 site-specific sculptures in the Relatum series, responding to the museum's Brutalist cylindrical design and human relations to nature. Also in 2019, Dia Beacon mounted a major showcase of their 2017 acquisition of three sculptural works by Lee: Relatum (formerly System, 1969), Relatum (formerly Language, 1971), and Relatum (1974). Placed within the context of his peers who developed Minimal, Postminimal, and Land art practices contemporaneously, such as Michael Heizer, Donald Judd, Robert Smithson, and Michelle Stuart, this presentation of Lee's work at Dia aimed to investigate the formal, material, and conceptual relationships between these artists. In 2020, Lee's work will be displayed at the STARS: Six Contemporary Artists from Japan to the World exhibition in Mori Art Museum in Tokyo, Japan. The exhibition featured one of Lee's earlier Relatum works along with the sculptural installation, Relatum - Dissonance, and two large-scale more recent Dialogue paintings.

Lee's sculptures are on display in the Rijksmuseum Garden, Amsterdam, the Netherlands https://www.rijksmuseum.nl/en/whats-on/exhibitions/lee-ufan May 28 - October 27, 2024. Admission Free.

== Collections & awards ==
Lee is represented in major museum collections including MoMA, New York; Guggenheim Museum, New York; Centre Georges Pompidou, Paris; Tate Gallery, London; Kröller-Müller Museum, Otterlo Holland; the National Museums of Modern Art in Tokyo, Kyoto and Osaka; the Yokohama Museum of Art and the National Museum of Contemporary Art in Seoul. His work is also held in the permanent collection of the Hiroshima City Museum of Contemporary Art and the Frederik Meijer Gardens & Sculpture Park.

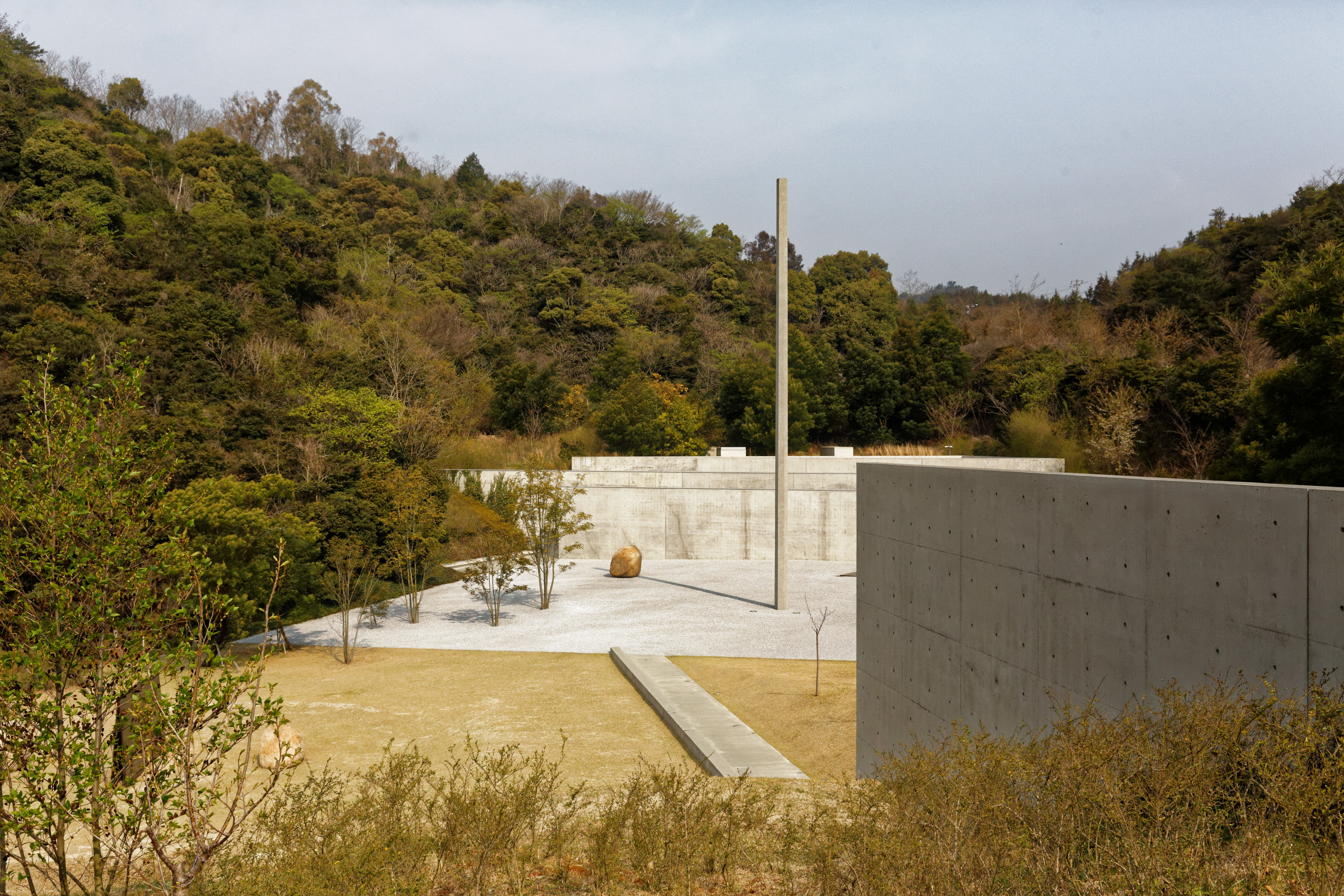
Lee Ufan Museum

In 1997, Lee was invited to serve as visiting professor at the Ecole Nationale Supérieure des Beaux-Arts in Paris. He received the UNESCO Prize at the Shanghai Biennale in 2000; the Ho-Am Prize of the Samsung Foundation in Korea in 2001; and the 13th Praemium Imperiale for painting in 2001. Other honors include Order of the Rising Sun, Gold Rays with Rosette in 2009, Legion of Honour, 2007, and the Geumgwan Prize (Gold Crown) Order of Cultural Merit (South Korea), 2013. In 2010, the Lee Ufan Museum, a building designed by architect Tadao Ando and operated by Benesse, opened on the island of Naoshima, Japan. In 2022, Lee opened a museum in Arles, France, in the 16th-century Hôtel Vernon also renovated by Tadao Ando. Comprising 1,347 square meters, it includes three levels dedicated to Lee's work and one floor of multipurpose space. On September 27, 2025, Lee Ufan received the "Aglaya International Award" for its contribution to the Culture of Peace, from the Artisophia Foundation, in the Canary Islands (Spain).

== Art market ==
Lee's primary dealers are Pace Gallery, in New York and Seoul; Scai the Bathhouse, in Tokyo; and Lisson Gallery, in London, New York and Shanghai.

The artist's most expensive works sold at auction:

1. $2,165,000 – From Line, 1976. Sotheby's, Nov 11, 2014.
2. $1,700,000 – From Point, 1978. Sotheby's, May 16, 2007.
3. $1,637,421 – From Point, 1979. Christie's, May 24, 2014.
4. $1,502,000 – From Line, 1978. Christie's, May 17, 2023.
5. $1,438,339 – Dialogue, 2020. Christie's, May 28, 2023.

== Publications ==
- 《양의의 표현》, 2022
- 《멈춰 서서》, 2004
- 《여백의 예술》, 2002
- 《시간의 여울》, 1994

== Bibliography ==
- Lee Ufan, Gary Tatintsian Gallery, 2015. ISBN 978-5-9906881-1-7
- Kee Joan, Contemporary Korean Art: Tansaekhwa and the Urgency of Method, University of Minnesota Press, 2013.
- Alexandra Munroe (2011). Lee Ufan: Marking Infinity. New York: Guggenheim Museum. ISBN 978-0-89207-418-1.
- Lee Ufan: The Art of Encounter, London 2008.
- S. von Berswordt-Wallrabe: Lee Ufan. Encounters with the Other, Steidl, Goettingen, 2008.
