= Chang Ucchin =

South Korean painter (1917–1990)

- Hangul: 장욱진
- Hanja: 張旭鎭
- RR: Jang Ukjin
- MR: Chang Ukchin

Chang Ucchin (Korean: 장욱진; Hanja: 張旭鎭, 26 November 1917 – 27 December 1990) was one of the most representative modern Korean artists. He is known for his oil paintings that depict Korean sceneries, animals, and children in simple and naive painting styles.

== Early life and education ==
Chang Ucchin was born on 26 November 1917, in Chūseinan-dō, Korea, Empire of Japan. After his father's death, he moved to Seoul (then Keijō) where his aunt became his guardian. Although his aunt was against Chang Ucchin's art education and career, he was granted her permission to pursue a career in art after winning first place in a national student art contest hosted by Joseon ilbo in 1938 with his painting Gong-gi nori (공기놀이, Game of Jackstones). He studied oil painting at Tokyo's Teikoku Art School (帝国美術学校) from 1939 to 1944. In Tokyo, he was able to receive a relatively progressive style of painting compared to the conservative and academic style taught in Tokyo Fine Arts School.

== Early career ==
After liberation in 1945, Chang Ucchin briefly worked for the National Museum of Korea until 1947 where he was able to learn about traditional Korean art and was inspired by traditional paintings, woodworks, and crafts.

From 1948 to 1952, he participated in group exhibitions of the New Realism Group (Sinsasilpa, 신사실파, 新寫實派) with fellow members such as Kim Whanki, Yoo Youngkuk, Lee Kyu-sang (이규상, 李揆祥, 1918–1964). The New Realism Group was focused on re-examining the direction of Korean modern and contemporary art by experimenting with new aesthetics and forms, as well as incorporating newly translated Korean traditions to modern elements.

During and after the Korean War, Chang Ucchin made use of the limited resources he had and produced several key works such as his self portrait, Boribat (보리밭, Barley Field, 1951), and Narutbae (나룻배, Ferry, 1951), of which the latter was painted behind Chang Ucchin's own beloved piece, Sonyeo (소녀, Girl, 1939) as he could not access canvases easily after the war. His years in refuge at Busan during the war was the only time cityscapes appear in his paintings. For instance, he painted clusters of houses in the city, as well as a car, bicycle, and Western-style house in Jadongcha ga itneun pung-gyeong (자동차가 있는 풍경, A View with a Car, 1953).

He became a professor of fine arts at Seoul National University in 1954, but resigned to paint full-time from 1960.

== Deokso Period (1963–1975) ==
After resigning his post at Seoul National University, Chang Ucchin moved to Deokso, Gyeong-gi-do Province, a small riverside village past the outskirts of Seoul in 1963. Living alone, he produced many works that depicted nature, animals, and people. His paintings of the Deokso period reflect his affection of nature and people surrounded by nature, and begin to show stronger brushstrokes and simplified geometric shapes.

Deokso period paintings depict people in simplified forms, often resembling stick figures or shown without facial features. People, especially children are shown in positions that are free, playful, and naive. These characteristics derived from his questioning of the innate and essential human nature and identity and his quest for true freedom and harmony with nature.

He effected a unique way in painting routine objects familiar to all Koreans such as children, magpies, the sun, and the moon. In the midst of the current of Western Modernism, he developed his own style of painting.

He depicted scenery surrounding him, his neighbors, and themes related to Buddhism. Chang Ucchin was raised in a Buddhist family and incorporated his beliefs into his paintings by choosing to use simple lines rather than elaborate brushstrokes as a way to express his pursuit of perpetual Buddhist enlightenment and studying the essence of all things in life. He was also inspired by his wife who read Buddhist scriptures and produced a series of her portraits, including Jinjinmyo (진진묘, 眞眞妙, 1970), titled after his wife's Buddhist name.

== Myeongryundong Period (1975–1979) ==
After purchasing and renovating an old house next to his family home, Chang Ucchin worked at his new studio in Myeongryundong, Seoul.

Paintings produced during this period began to use symmetrical compositions compared to earlier works that were heavily focused on the centre of the canvas.

He also continued to experiment with new media. In addition to oil painting, he tried various formative practices such as marker pen drawing, Chinese ink painting, painting on pottery, silkscreen, copperplate print, and wood-block print. The paintings on pottery were collaborations between the ceramists Yoon Kwang-cho and Shin Sang-ho. Chang Ucchin began to produce many ink paintings from 1979 and the depiction of trees that were typically round in earlier periods began to be shown in irregular forms, reflecting his continuous experimentation with form, pattern, and style.

Some of his paintings during this period depict people and facial expressions in a humorous and childlike manner, in contrast to the highly abstract and simplified shape of people and children during his stay at Deokso. For instance, Yeoinsang (여인상, Image of a Woman, 1979) depicts a woman standing in a timid pose with enlarged bare feet on the ground. Her facial features are exaggerated but is cheerful and bright, much like the peaceful and colourful background that contains a dirt road that leads to a village of houses, a sun at the centre of the sky, a bird and a dog. The image is reflective of Chang Ucchin's affection of people, nature, and a pastoral life.

Chang Ucchin also wrote several short writings for newspapers and magazines, and later collated these to an essay collection titled Gang-ga ui ateullie (강가의 아틀리에, Atelier by the River, 1976).

== Suanbo Period (1980–1985) ==
In 1980, Chang Ucchin set up his studio at Suanbo, Chungcheong-do Province from his Seoul family home at Myeongryundong. During this period, he produced a large volume of works, hinting to the stabilisation of his artistic style as he reached his late 60s and 70s. The theme of his paintings also reflected his age and paintings like Sigoljip (시골집, House in the Countryside, 1980) was elaborative of his loneliness as he awaited for his children's return.

From the 1980s, Chang Ucchin's works began to show stronger Eastern influence in both his painting style and materials used. For instance, he used elements of traditional literati ink paintings and minhwa (민화, 民畵, folk painting), and even used ink brushes instead of oil brushes to amplify the translucent appearance of ink on canvas.

Chang Ucchin also travelled to the United States in 1982 where he held an exhibition of a few of his oil paintings, silk screens, etchings, and ink paintings, and again to Europe in 1983 and held a prints exhibition in Paris.

== Sin-gal Period (1986–1987) ==
In his final years, Chang Ucchin worked at Sin-gal, Yong-in. In these last years, Chang Ucchin's works expressed stronger influence of traditional minhwa painting styles and employed stronger and vivid colours. His childlike painting style became more fluid in its form and composition.

== Legacy ==
Chang Ucchin is considered to be one of the greatest pioneers of Korean modern art. His works are thought to be the most genuine expressions of his life, alongside his views on nature and its interaction and harmony with people. His unique painting styles and naive expressions have made him one of the most highly commemorated Korean artists of the twentieth century.

In April 2014, The Chang Ucchin Foundation unveiled the Chang Ucchin Museum of Art, built in collaboration with the city of Yangju. The museum houses 362 pieces of Chang's artworks.
