= Whanki Kim =

South Korean painter (1913–1974)

- Born: April 3, 1913; Sinan County, Zenranan-dō, Korea, Empire of Japan
- Died: July 25, 1974 (aged 61); New York City, U.S.
- Known for: Painting
- Movement: Abstract art
- Spouse: Hyang-an Kim (1944-)
- Children: Wha Young Kim; Young Suk Kim; Geum Ja Kim; Chung In Kim
- Relatives: Ku Pon-ung; Yun Hyongkeun; Choi Seung-hyun (great-nephew)

- Whanki Kim
- Hangul: 김환기
- Hanja: 金煥基
- RR: Gim Hwangi
- MR: Kim Hwan'gi

Kim Whanki (Korean: 김환기; Hanja: 金煥基; April 3, 1913 – July 25, 1974) was a Korean painter and pioneering abstract artist. Kim lived and worked in a number of cities and countries during his lifetime, including Tokyo, Japan; Seoul and Busan, Korea; Paris, France; and New York City, USA, where he died.

Kim belongs to the first generation of Korean Abstract artists, mixing oriental concepts and ideals with abstraction. With refined and moderated formative expression based on Korean Lyricism, he created his characteristic art world. His artworks largely dealt with diverse hues and patterns. Kim's early works were semi-abstract paintings which allowed viewers to see certain forms, but his later works were more deeply absorbed abstract paintings, filled with lines and spaces.

The artist's partner Hyang-an Kim established the Whanki Foundation in 1978 and opened the Whanki Museum in 1992. The Museum, located in Seoul, was built by Korean American architect Kyu Sung Woo.

A pioneer of abstract painting and the godfather of the Dansaekhwa movement, Whanki Kim established his place in Korean history and art at an early age. Whanki Kim was an artist whose profound impact on the history of Korean art was seen in the first wave of abstract art. His nomadic lifestyle led him to many different places, like Japan, France, and the U.S., which differentiated his artwork from other artists, who created their art based in Korea, due to the lack of opportunities for travel. As a peripatetic artist gaining inspiration from artists of other origins, Whanki Kim's style of abstract art transformed from geometric abstraction to art with traditional Korean motifs to monochrome paintings of dots and lines. He balanced keeping Korean values and beliefs close and incorporating new foreign techniques into his works, which evidently reflect his personal identity and Korea's national identity, impacted by the political and social conditions of the mid-1900s.

== Biography ==
=== Early life ===
Born as the fourth child and only son of wealthy farmer and local landowner Kim Sang-hyeon (김상현), Kim Whanki grew up comfortably in Eupdong-ri, Kijwado, Anjwa-myeon, Sinan County, Zenranan-dō, Korea, Empire of Japan. After graduating from elementary school, Kim was sent to Seoul to live with his older sister and attend Choongdong Middle School (중동중학교). His family then supported him to study abroad in Tokyo, Japan, where he attended Kinjō Middle School. During his five years of study, he learned to play the violin. Once Kim returned home in 1932, his father objected to Kim's wishes to continue his studies and set Kim to marry.

=== Tokyo, Japan: 1932–1937 ===
Having decided to become an artist against his father's wishes, Kim secretly boarded a vessel bound for Japan. Thus in 1933, at the age of 20, Kim enrolled in the 3-year program offered at the Department of Arts at Nihon University in Tokyo. During his second year into the program, Kim joined the Avant-Garde Western Painting Institute (アヴァンギャルド洋画研究所, AbuangyarudoYōga Kenkyūjo), led by Japanese artists who were introducing to Japan Cubism, Futurism, and Surrealism based on their experience living and working in Europe. Among his mentors were Togo Seiji and Tsuguharu Foujita. In 1935, Kim is awarded for his first submission to the prestigious Second Section Association (二科会, Nikakai, 이과전, Igwajŏn), When the Skylarks Sing (종달새 노래할 때), marking his debut as an artist. The painting portrays a woman dressed in hanbok, whose body was rendered in geometric, simplified forms. The basket upon her head is "transparent" by showing its content at an impossible angle, revealing Kim's interest apart from realism and towards abstraction. His experiments of incorporating Korean motifs as simplified forms onto the flat picture plane continued, as can be seen in House <집> (1936) and Sauce Jar Terrace <장독대> (1936). Features often seen in traditional Korean houses, such as wooden gates, paper screen doors, stone walls, stairs, and pottery, are also noted to have added a sense of order and repetition to his paintings, further illustrating his development towards pure abstraction.

During this time Kim participated in activities led by Japan's many artist associations, such as the Hakujitsu Society (白日会), Kofu Society (光風會, Kofukai, 광풍회, Kwangp'unghoe), Free Artists' Association (自由美術家協会, Jiyū Bijutsuka Kyōkai), the Room Nine Society (九室會; Kyushitsukai), and the Hakuban Society (白蛮会, 백만회, Paengmanhoe). The Hakuban was established in 1936 after the closure of the Avant-Garde Western Painting Institute by five of its members, including Kim and Gil Jin-seop (길진섭, 吉鎭燮, 1970–1975). His first solo exhibition took place at the Amagi Gallery in Tokyo in January 1937, only months before returning to Korea. Even after he left Tokyo, Kim continued to submit works to the Free Artists' Association in Japan until 1941, including Rondo <론도> (1938). As one of the earliest examples of abstract art in modern Korea, the country's government designated the painting as a Registered Cultural Property (No. 535) in 2013.

He even stayed an additional year in Japan as an assistant before returning to Korea in 1937. Kim's time in Tokyo supported his identity as an Abstract artist. In his university years, he became fascinated by the work of Henri Matisse and Pablo Picasso His works of 1937 and 1938, such as Rondo, Aria, and White Seagull, are said to show a clear turn toward abstraction with their compositions of pure geometric shapes consisting of repeated rhythmic circular and oblong shapes with squares intersecting or overlapping.

Whanki Kim's early art experimentation with geometric abstraction drew inspiration from Cubism. His first piece that gained popularity was When Skylarks Sing (1935), which depicts a woman holding a basket on top of her head. The building in the background plays with light and shadows and is one of the many geometric shapes that creates depth in the painting. Whanki Kim contrasts the realistic depiction of a traditional Korean woman with an ambiguous background that muddles the exact setting of the painting. There is also a lack of details on the woman's body and face. The artwork reflects Whanki Kim's perception of colonial Korea under Japan's rule, in which Kim as a Korean was relatively distanced from society and had different perspectives than a Korean artist who was attached and impacted by the war.

=== Seoul: 1938–1951 ===
After returning from his studies in Tokyo, Kim continued to befriend members of the Korean literary circle while gaining more interest in traditional Korean art. By 1940, this exhibition was no longer called the Free Artists Exhibition. It was called the Creative Artists Association, due to increasing military tensions that did not encourage new ideas. The Creative Artists Association made a branch in Korea and held its first exhibition in Seoul, where Kim, fellow Korean artists, as well as a number of Japanese artists exhibited their work. Kim is said to have submitted six pieces: Island Tale, Still Life, Landscape 1, Landscape 2, Landscape at Atami, and Chamber Music before he left the Association in 1941.

In 1944, Kim, who had divorced his first wife, remarried Byun Dong-rim (변동림, 卞東琳, 1916–2004), who was a prodigiously talented writer and widow of poet Yi Sang. Defying the objections from their families, Byun took Kim's art name–Hyang-an–at the time of marriage and lived as such until her death. Kim changed his art name to Su-hwa (수화, 樹話).

Korea was liberated from Japanese rule in 1945 and established its independent government by 1948. The same year, Kim, along with artists Yoo Youngkuk, Lee Kyusang (이규상, 李揆祥, 1918–1967), created the New Realism Group (신사실파, Shinsashilp'a). Its foundational idea was to pursue new types of realistic painting and contribute to the perception of a "new formation of reality", which could be exist apart from Japan's direct influence as well as the right-left ideological struggles that dominated the Cold War period of Korea. Navigating between figuration and non-figuration, the group has since been considered pioneers of Korean abstract art and one of the most influential artist groups in Korean modern art. Participating members included Chang Ucchin, Paek Youngsu (백영수, 白榮洙, 1922–2018), and Lee Jung-seob.

For the New Realism Group's second exhibition held in 1949, Kim submitted his painting Jar and Flowers <백자와 꽃> (1949). The work, in which a piece of white porcelain is rendered as a round abstract geometric form, is considered to be one of the earliest examples from Kim's oeuvre in which he employs pottery as a significant motif for which he received critical acclaim. Since his return to his home country from Japan, Kim had collected and developed a sophisticated taste for Korean antiquities and pottery, especially for a type of white porcelain ware made in the Joseon period widely known as moon jars. It is known that he enjoyed displaying and observing Korean pottery in his home, while depicting the very same objects in his paintings. As a motif in Kim's paintings, Korean pottery was employed as an aesthetic solution for reconciling tradition with modernity.

Our [Korean] jars opened my scope on aesthetic quality and Korean people, which can be said that the textbook I used were these jars.

Based on his submissions to the neorealism exhibitions, Kim's works during 1942 and 1950 show inspiration from nature and everyday life. His desire to present pure composition and simplified objects is evident in work such as Woods.

=== Busan: 1951–1953 ===
During the Korean War, the South Korean government moved to the southern port city of Busan, along with many refugees. Whanki Kim also fled Seoul for safety in the South and entered a refugee camp for three years. These years are said to have been a time of suffering for Whanki Kim—his wife, Hyang-an Kim, recalls his strong rage and habit of drinking, though he did continue to paint. Some of the works produced during this time are Refugee Train <피난열차> (1951), Landscape at Chin-hae, Shanty, and Jars and Women <항아리와 여인들> (1951).

Kim's oil painting An Evacuation Train from 1951 is another example of his early abstraction work that reflects his distance from the Korean war. This painting shows a crowd of refugees crammed together in train carriages, creating a claustrophobic environment. While some artists opted for sorrowful, more realistic depictions of this era using dark tones, Whanki Kim added his own touch of brighter hues of red and blue and simple shapes. There seems to be a contradiction between the urgent, claustrophobic environment of Koreans fleeing the war and the cartoon-like depiction of the refugees. This painting also reflected a time when abstract American art was promoted by the United States Information (USIS). Western art was easily accessible for Korean artists through funded subscriptions to newspapers, magazines, and art journals, which introduced the contemporary trends of abstraction. The true origin of this agenda was the U.S.-led anti-communist campaign against the socialist realist art of North Korea, and the USIS paid South Korean artists, including Whanki Kim, whose work represented an antidote to North Korean cultural practices. This was opposed to forcefully produced art with subjects of Stalin and Kim Il Sung during the time of South Korea under the North Korean rule.

=== Seoul: 1953–1956 ===
When Kim Whanki returned to Seoul in 1953, his obsession with jars grew once again and even more than before. He drew jars over and over again in his works including Jar and Poetry, White Jar and Woman, Jar, and Jar and Plum Blossoms. His return to Seoul also allowed him to teach at the College of Fine Arts, Hongik University, to hold a one-man exhibition at the USIS Gallery, and to be elected a member of the Korean Academy.

=== Paris: 1956–1959 ===
Kim's journals show that his departure for Paris was something he had been planning for quite a while. Starting in 1954, many Korean artists made this trip including Nam Kwan, Kim Heung-su, and Kim Chong-ha. Paris, the capital of the world of modern art, was the place that would cure them of their sense of inferiority, which had resulted from their negative experiences with Western art in Japan. Even though many artists and their works were significantly changed during trips abroad, Kim intentionally retained his artistic style and continued to portray motifs of jars, birds, mountains, deer, and plum blossoms. Away in France, Kim came to better understand and appreciate the unique qualities of Korea and Korean art.

Whanki Kim frequently traveled to new places to adopt new artistic techniques and incorporate them into his work, and his goal throughout his career was to reach this universality of a "boundaryless integration of Eastern and Western aesthetics". He was tired of his works being viewed as either an abandonment of Korean values or as a weak imitation of "authentic" Western art. A symbol of Whanki Kim's struggle to reach this seamless integration of both traditional/modern and Eastern/Western style was the buncheong jar from the Joseon dynasty. The Joseon Dynasty pottery can be characterized as large, white, thick, and misshapen, and has a utilitarian function. An infamous piece is the "Moon Jar," which is a white porcelain vessel that is shaped round, like a moon. When he traveled to Paris, his paintings underwent intense change, including the color palette primarily becoming blue, and they began to mimic the mottled ceramic surfaces. In the 1950s, Whanki Kim began to incorporate traditional motifs from the Korean landscape, such as a blue moon, mountains, and plum blossoms. Jar (1958) by Whanki Kim represented the transition from flat, patchy strokes to a building-up of layers. The texture of this piece is evidently thick and mottled, akin to traditional Korean pottery. Further, the jar as a subject has no sense of space as there are no referential objects surrounding it. The scale of the moon is as big as the jar, which creates a "zoom-in" effect and adds to the abstraction of the art. Adding these Korean motifs to his artwork made Kim more aware of his Korean identity in a time of constant travel. Visiting Paris was a transformative experience for Whanki Kim as he was able to experiment with the stained glass effect of Roualt's paintings to replicate the 3D nature and texture of the buncheong jar onto the 2D canvas. He was able to combine the "Koreanness" of the Joseon Dynasty jar and elements of the abstract expressionist movement.

=== Seoul: 1959–1963 ===
On his return to Seoul in 1959 he was almost immediately offered the position of Dean of Faculty at the College of Fine Arts at Hongik University. In 1960, he became President of Hongik Art College. He found himself teaching and performing administrative duties more often than he was concentrating on art. He often felt frustrated during this time because of conflicts with other board members and the lack of connection between reality and what dreams he had for the institutions of art.

=== New York: 1963–1974 ===
1963 was the first year Korea participated in the São Paulo Biennial, in which Kim participated as the country's commissioner and among the seven featured artists: Young-ju Kim (김영주, 金永周, (1920–1995), Yoo Youngkuk, Kim Ki-chang, Suh Se-ok, Han Yong-jin (한용진, 韓鏞進, 1934–), and Yoo Gang-yeol (유강열, 劉康烈, 1920–1976). Submitting three works–Moonlight in Summer Night <여름 달밤> (1961), Moonlight Night of Island <섬의 달밤> (1959), and Cloud and Moon <운월> (1963)–Kim was awarded an Honorable Mention for painting. Upon seeing the works of at the Biennale, such as the works of American artist Adolph Gottlieb whom was awarded the Grande Prêmio, Kim reported his desire for the "internationalization" of Korean art.

"The Korean room [in the Biennial] was good. My painting wasn't bad either. I felt confident that my art had meaning. ... There's beauty in my art, and this beauty comes from having lived in the Korean countryside."

Thus in 1963, Kim relocated to New York, a city that was emerging as a new center for modern Art. Hyang-an Kim joined Kim in New York the following year. With a grant from the Asia Society funded by the foundation of John D. Rockefeller III, they settled in a studio on the Upper West Side of Manhattan. There he found support from a number of Korean cultural attaché's, Korean American artists Po Kim, John Pai (1937–), and Nam June Paik, as well as American artists Adolph Gottlieb and Mark Rothko.

When Whanki Kim arrived in New York, he began to experiment with new materials, like newspaper pages and oil paints. He was curious about how different oil paints reacted with the oil on the newspaper, which created a "shifting, moving sense of paint laying on top of a surface" compared to the absorption effect of watercolor paint, which led to his interest in paper-mache. A paper sculpture called Daejup (1968) represents the transformation Kim's art underwent to merge the oil paintings on the newspapers with 3D sculptures. Whanki Kim took pride in the fact that he conserved "Koreanness" into his art as the oil paint on paper mimicked the mottled surface of pottery from Joseon dynasty. Daejup is a wide black jar that widens near the top and has symmetrical dots surrounding the lining of the jar. The dots are intentionally disordered to add an organic sense to the work, similar to the jars of the Joseon time period. What made Whanki Kim so extraordinary was that even while moving to New York and picking up these new techniques of paper-mache, he protected elements of his homeland. New York allowed him to be free of all social obligations and just focus on the creativity of his work. However, it is important to acknowledge that other Korean artists in his realm did not have the privilege and opportunity to drop all of their responsibilities to pursue art. Thus, Whanki Kim had an advantage when it came to access to foreign techniques and the ability to explore.

Most noted from the artist's time in New York is the rise of the series of "all-over canvas dot paintings" (점면전화, Chŏmmyŏnjŏnhwa) or simply known as "dot paintings". By 1970, Kim began to produce paintings that filled the entire surface of his unprimed canvases with small, irregular dots using oil paint mixed with turpentine. An early, significant example is Where, in What Form, Shall We Meet Again? <어디서 무엇이 되어 다시 만나랴> (1970), titled after a poem of his friend and Korean poet Kim Gwang-Seop (김광섭, 1905–1977). While the work resulted from years of experimentation with abstraction and the geometrical elements that make up painting–dot, line, and plane–, the subdued palette as well as the watered-down paint produced an effect of blurred ink, evocative of East Asian ink wash painting. With Where, in What Form, Shall We Meet Again?, Kim was awarded the Grand Prize at the first iteration of the Korean Art Grand Award Exhibition. Drastically different from Kim's work from Korea that depicted Korean motifs and sentiments, his purely abstract style left a great impression to the Korean art scene.

Kim continued to produce "dot paintings" on larger-sized canvases and experimented with different colors, especially with range of blue hues. By 1971, Kim took a turn on its composition by arranging the dots in a circular or curvilinear fashion, such as seen in Universe 05-IV-71 #200 (1971). Universe, which is regarded as one of the most important works of the artist's oeuvre today, was well received in New York at the time. The work was included in Kim's solo show at New York's Poindexter Gallery, where he continued to show annually, until his death in 1974.

Dansaekhwa, also known as the monochrome painting movement, included paintings of gray, brown, beige, and white hues produced in the late 1960s and applied to paintings that manifested a merger between the artist's body and mind by exploring the physicality of the painting materials. This movement stemmed from the desire to reclaim their stolen "Koreanness" pride from the war and the need for strong political and social control. It was also a departure from the Japanese-style Nihonga that represented the colonial period of Korea and adopted abstract paintings in Western art scenes during the era of modernization. In Universe (1971), Kim painted repeating rows of circles made of dots that capture the essence of waves pulsating on the shore. The dots "seem to proliferate like living cells" and "represent the flow of powerful solar energy", which allows the audience to experience synesthesia. Since no two dots are the same, the movement of each piece is uneven and causes the eye to lose focus and get lost in the painting. Whanki Kim distinguishes himself from other artists with the temporality of his work. American paintings tend to have that "all-at-once" aspect, while Whanki Kim's work is constantly dynamic and there is an implicit sense of movement at all times. New York was a significant transitional period because the usual motifs, like the bird and moon, were gradually replaced by dots and lines, as seen in this work. His pieces became less figurative and more abstract with linear horizontals and verticals and diagonal arrangements. Compared to his earlier works with very bright hues, Universe, along with his later works, were gray-blue or black and encapsulated the "Whanki Blue" palette. Further, Kim designed this piece so that the audience could picture the movement of shimmering heavenly bodies mimicked by the dynamic dots. Individuals are stimulated to become "one" with the painting. This transition and disappearance of Korean motifs can also speak to Whanki Kim's distance from his Korean identity as he settled in New York and became engrossed in foreign works.

During his career in New York, works depicting cosmic, planetary subjects, sound, echo, and music arose. In the second half of his time in New York, Kim spent much time on collages, papier-mâché works, and oil-on-newspaper paintings. It was during this time that Kim began to utilize dots in his works, sometimes even covering whole canvases with just dots, such as in Where and in What Form Are We to Meet Again? (1970) and 05-IV-71 #200 (Universe) (1971). The latter was sold for HK$102m (US$13.03m), surpassing its estimate of HK$48m-62m, and became the most expensive Korean work of art.

=== Death ===
Kim had an operation on his cervical spine to correct neck pain resulting from a lifetime of stooping over his detailed work for up to 10 hours a day. The operation went well, but Kim experienced a fall in the hospital and suffered an intracerebral hemorrhage, which caused his death at age 61.

=== Descendents ===
His great-nephew is Choi Seung-hyun (b. 1987), an artist, actor, and rapper active under the moniker T.O.P as well as a former member of Big Bang.

== See also ==
- Whanki Museum

== Exhibitions ==
- 22nd Second Section Association Exhibition (二科会, Nikakai), Tokyo, Japan; 1935 (Awarded)
- 23rd Second Section Association Exhibition (二科会, Nikakai), Tokyo, Japan; 1936 (Awarded)
- Amagi Gallery, Tokyo, Japan; Solo Exhibition; 1937
- Jeongjaok Gallery, Seoul, Korea; Solo Exhibition; 1940
- 1st New Realism Group (신사실파, Shinsashilp'a) Exhibition, Hwashin Gallery, Seoul, Korea; 1948
- 2nd New Realism Group (신사실파, Shinsashilp'a) Exhibition, Hwashin Gallery, Seoul, Korea; 1949
- 1st National Exhibition (대한민국미술전람회, Taehanmin'gungmisulchŏllamhoe), Seoul, Korea; 1949
- 3rd New Realism Group (신사실파, Shinsashilp'a) Exhibition, Hwashin Gallery, Seoul, Korea; 1950
- New Seoul Tea Room, Busan, Korea; Solo Exhibition; 1952
- USIS Gallery, Seoul, Korea; Solo Exhibition; 1954
- Donghwa Gallery, Seoul, Korea; Solo Exhibition; 1956
- M.Bénezit Gallery, Paris, France; Solo Exhibition; 1956
- M.Bénezit Gallery, Paris, France; Solo Exhibition; 1956
- M.Bénezit Gallery, Paris, France; Solo Exhibition; 1957
- M.Bénezit Gallery, Paris, France; Solo Exhibition; 1957
- Cheval de Verre Gallery, Brussels, Belgium; Solo Exhibition; 1957
- Institut Gallery, Paris, France; Solo Exhibition; 1958
- Contemporary Korean Paintings, World House Galleries, New York, New York, United States; organized by Ellen Psaty Conant
- Kim Whanki Art Exhibition; Korean Information Center, Seoul, Korea; Solo Exhibition; 1959
- Bando Gallery, Seoul, Korea; Solo Exhibition; 1960
- Korean Information Center, Seoul, Korea; Solo Exhibition; 1961
- Korean Information Center, Seoul, Korea; Solo Exhibition; 1962
- Korean Information Center, Seoul, Korea; Solo Exhibition; 1963
- 7th São Paulo Biennale, São Paulo, Brazil; 1963 (Honorable Mention for Painting)
- Asia House Gallery, New York, New York, United States; Solo Exhibition; 1964
- 8th São Paulo Biennale, Special Exhibition Room, São Paulo, Brazil; 1965
- Tasca Gallery, New York, New York, United States; Solo Exhibition; 1966
- Gotham Book Mart Gallery, New York, New York, United States; Solo Exhibition; 1968
- 1st Korea Arts Exhibition, Gyeongbokgung Palace Museum, Seoul, Korea; 1970 (Grand Prize)
- Whanki, Poindexter Gallery, New York, New York, United States; Solo Exhibition; September 25–October 21, 1971
- Shinsegye Gallery, Seoul, Korea; Solo Exhibition; 1971
- Poindexter Gallery, New York, New York, United States; Solo Exhibition; 1972
- Poindexter Gallery, New York, New York, United States; Solo Exhibition; 1973
- Poindexter Gallery, New York, New York, United States; Solo Exhibition; 1974

Selected Posthumous Exhibitions

- Whanki, paintings 1960-1974, Poindexter Gallery, New York, New York, United States; February 18–March 8, 1975
- 13th São Paulo Biennial, Special Exhibition Whanki; October 17–December 15, 1975
- Kim Whanki Retrospective, National Museum of Modern and Contemporary Art, Korea; December 3–December 17, 1975
- Kim Whanki 10th Death Anniversary Commemorative Exhibition, National Museum of Modern and Contemporary Art, Korea; March 1–March 25, 1984
- Whanki: Retrospective 1963-1974, Centre National des Arts Plastiques, Paris, France; May 12–June 14, 1987
- Whanki Kim, New York 1963–1974, Whanki Museum, Seoul, Korea; 1992
- Asian Traditions/Modern Expressions: Asian American Artists and Abstraction, 1945–1970, Jane Voorhees Zimmerli Art Museum, Rutgers University, New Brunswick, New Jersey; 1997

== Further reading and external links ==
- Whanki Museum
- Kim Whanki, Encyclopedia of Korean Culture (KO)
- Kim Whanki, Korean Wikipedia (KO)
- Kim Whanki, Korean Art Multilingual Dictionary
- (in Korean) Naver Cast - Whanki Kim
- (in Korean) Doosan Encyclopedia - Whanki Kim
- Brief biography of Kim Hwan'gi, in: Keith Pratt; Richard Rutt; Jamese Hoare (1999). Korea: A Historical and Cultural Dictionary. Curzon. pp. 212–213. ISBN 0700704647.
- Barry Schwabsky on the Kim Whanki exhibition at the Ecole Nationale Supérieure des Beaux-Arts, in: Artforum, Summer 1996
- Korean Art Pioneer Kim Whan-ki Advanced Technology & Design KOREA
