= Kyu Sung Woo =

South Korean architect (born 1941)

- Born: 1941 (age 84–85); Seoul, South Korea
- Education: Seoul National University (BS, MS); Columbia University (MS); Harvard University (MS)
- Occupation: Architect
- Awards: Ho-Am Prize in the Arts

Korean name
- Hangul: 우규승
- Hanja: 禹圭昇
- RR: U Gyuseung
- MR: U Kyusŭng

Kyu Sung Woo (Korean: 우규승; Hanja: 禹圭昇; born 1941) is a South Korean architect and principal of the architectural design firm, Kyu Sung Woo Architects, Inc. The firm's projects include many built and proposed works in the United States and South Korea.

== Biography ==
Kyu Sung Woo was born in Seoul, South Korea. After receiving a Bachelor of Science and Master of Science in Architectural Engineering at Seoul National University, he went to the United States in 1967. He then studied at Columbia University, where he received a Master of Architecture (1968) and Harvard University, where he received a Master of Architecture in Urban Design (1970). He founded Kyu Sung Woo Architects, Inc. in 1990 after working in various design and consulting positions around the US. In 2008, Woo received the South Korea's Ho-Am Prize in the Arts. He is a Fellow of the American Institute of Architects.

== Architectural style ==
The frequent use of simplified rectilinear forms and volumes in Woo's works tie him to the modernist movement. Additionally, several aspects of his style are often drawn from his cultural experience living in both South Korea and The United States. Hong-bin Kang, a fellow South Korean architect, remarked that, "It is meaningless to ask if Woo is a 'Korean' architect or an 'American' architect: for he is neither, and at the same time, both… He does not try to sell 'oriental' qualities to the American architectural community, nor does he attempt to introduce the latest in Western architecture to Koreans." Evidence of these two cultural influences can be seen in Woo's Putney Mountain House, which features pitched New England–style roofs along with large sliding glass doors, similar to the screen doors that would lead to outdoor courtyards in traditional Korean homes.
Furthermore, Woo often articulates his design philosophy in terms of how the necessities of a building's site should shape its appearance and organization. In discussing the Whanki Museum, Woo stated, “… I tried to consider how to conform the museum’s existence as a public building to the scale of its neighborhood, its topography, and its natural environment.”

== Projects ==
Woo's works include varying scales of buildings, from small homes to mass residential complexes and institutional buildings.

=== Olympic Village Housing – Seoul ===
While working at Woo & Williams (later to become Kyu Sung Woo Architects, Inc.), Woo entered an international competition in 1985 to design a housing village for the athletes and reporters of the 24th Olympic Games in Seoul. Woo's design was selected and completed in 1988. The Olympic Village, which is located south of the city, includes 5,540 housing units and supporting facilities. It is arranged in a fan shape, with residential units radiating from a U-shaped galleria and public plaza. The buildings conform to a bowl-shaped landscape, with the residential towers increasing in height as they move outwards from the central plaza. Throughout the course of the Games, 13,000 athletes and 7,000 journalists were housed in the complex.
Following the Olympic Games, the complex was repurposed into a permanent urban community. This community includes a subway station, three schools, and religious, cultural, recreational, and retail facilities.

=== Whanki Museum ===
The Whanki Museum is a museum/exhibition complex located in the Buam Dong Valley in Seoul. The building was constructed in 1992 in commemoration of the contemporary Korean painter, Kim Whanki. The, complex occupies two blocks, one of which houses the works of Kim Whanki, while the other contains a temporary art exhibition space, a cafeteria, and a shop. The compound is arranged to follow the east–west axis of the valley.
The central hall of the museum building serves as the unifying space in Woo's design. The 8-meter-tall (26 ft) cube-shaped space is partially underground and divided in order to create display space for paintings on the bottom walls. The top walls are carved away into columns, revealing a stairwell that encompasses the space. The hall is lit directly using artificial light and a central skylight and indirectly through the adjacent mezzanine.
In designing the Museum, Woo described his desired connection between Kim's art and his own architecture, "In exhibition spaces, the architectural experience should be subordinate to that of the art. Here and elsewhere, however, architecture does not have to play a passive role. The process of absorbing art is a collective and continuous experience that occurs throughout a museum, an intense activity that needs intervals of rest. Occasional connections with nature and the context, activated by the architecture of a museum, can enhance one’s experience of a work of art and make one’s appreciation of both more relevant and rich."

=== 10 Akron Street ===
10 Akron Street is a LEED Gold certified residence hall on the Harvard University campus in Cambridge, Massachusetts. The building is situated on the banks of the Charles River and at the foot of a 22-story residential tower, Peabody Terrace, designed by Josep Lluis Sert (an architect whom Woo had studied under at Harvard).
The residence hall is a 115,000-square-foot building that is U-shaped in plan. It was constructed in 2008 around a courtyard garden designed by Michael Van Valkenburgh. Due to the building's highly public location at the entrance of campus, Woo aimed to reconcile the scale and massing of the building with those of the surrounding communities and views.
On the design of 10 Akron Street, Woo remarked, "I wanted this building to relate to and complement Peabody Terrace both in massing and scale. These two projects, however, are designed 50 years apart and are reflections of their own time. Innovation was the essence of Peabody Terrace for housing typology, construction, technology, and aesthetics; while Akron housing was an attempt to retain tradition and innovation within the given changing conditions of the city and campus."

== Other notable projects ==
- Asian Culture Complex – Gwangju, South Korea
- Village Residence Halls – Brandeis University
- Heller School – Brandeis University
- Putney Mountain House – Putney, Vermont
- Stone Cloud – Seoul
- Nerman Museum for Contemporary Art – Overland Park, Kansas
- Woo Residence – Cambridge, Massachusetts
- Residence Hall – Massachusetts College of Art, Boston
- International Village – Northeastern University, Boston
- Behrakis Health Sciences Center – Northeastern University
- Arts of Korea Gallery – Metropolitan Museum of Art, New York
- Student Housing – Bennington College, Vermont
- Keum Jung Sports Park – Busan, South Korea
- Observatory Commons – Cambridge, Massachusetts
