= Whanki Museum =

Coordinates: 37.5944°N 126.9663°E

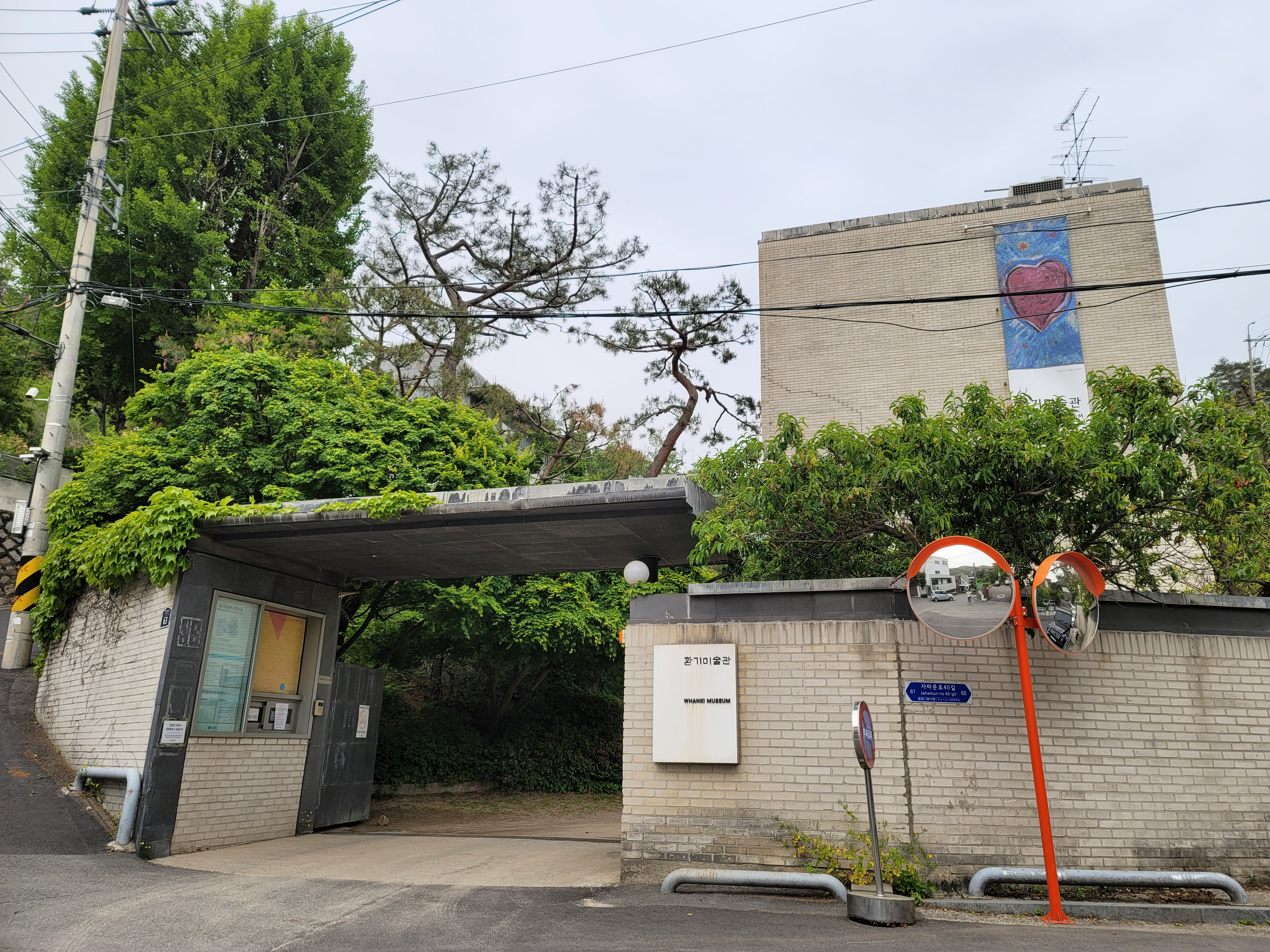
- Established: 1992
- Location: 210-8 Buam-dong, Jongno-gu, Seoul, South Korea
- Type: art museum
- Director: Mee-jung Park
- Architect: Kyu Sung Woo
- Website: whankimuseum.org

Korean name
- Hangul: 환기미술관
- Hanja: 煥基美術館
- RR: Hwangi misulgwan
- MR: Hwan'gi misulgwan

The Whanki Museum is a private art museum in Jongno-gu, in central Seoul, South Korea. It was established by the Whanki Foundation mainly to exhibit and commemorate the art of Whanki Kim, one of Korea's foremost abstract painters. The museum is located in Buam-dong, close to Seongbuk-dong, Seongbuk-gu, where Whanki Kim and his wife spent many years. The atmosphere and natural environment of the two places have much in common. The museum building was designed by architect Kyu Sung Woo. Construction began in 1990, and the museum opened in November, 1992.

The bulk of the collection is displayed in the main building which was specially designed to showcase Whanki Kim's art. Special exhibitions are held in Annex 1, which includes a café and art shop on the ground floor. The latest addition, Annex 2, is used for lectures.

In 2026, the museum was accused by local residents of poisoning a ginkgo tree, which museum officials had previously complained to the council was causing structural damage to the museum's outer wall. Holes had been drilled into the tree, and funnels used to inject herbicide. Museum authorities refused to confirm or deny involvement.

== See also ==
- List of single-artist museums
- List of museums in Seoul
- List of museums in South Korea
- Korean painting
