= Nerman Museum of Contemporary Art =

- Established: 2007
- Location: 12345 College Blvd; Overland Park, Kansas
- Coordinates: 38°55′30″N 94°43′37″W
- Type: Art museum
- Website: www.nermanmuseum.org

The Nerman Museum of Contemporary Art is an art museum that is part of Johnson County Community College in Overland Park, Kansas.

The Nerman Museum is named for donors Jerry and Margaret Nerman. It opened in October 2007, succeeding the college's former Gallery of Art. The building was designed by Korean architect Kyu Sung Woo.

Construction of the approximately $15 million Nerman Museum was realized through Johnson County Community College funding, with support from the Nerman Family, the M.R. & Evelyn Hudson Foundation, the Ewing Marion Kauffman Foundation, Marti & Tony Oppenheimer, Richard I. & Jeanne S. Galamba, Barton P. & Mary D. Cohen, Dean E. Thompson, Irma Starr, Carl & Lee McCaffree, Jim & Mary Tearney, and Joseph & Margery Lichtor.

The museum building is clad in Kansas limestone. The museum's two levels house ten expansive galleries for temporary exhibitions and the permanent collection. Additional spaces in the museum include the 200 seat Hudson Auditorium, Café Tempo, two classrooms, and art storage and preparation spaces. The museum boasts two lobbies – the Richard I. and Jeanne S. Galamba Lobby (north cantilever entrance), featuring a 60,000 white LED installation by artist Leo Villareal, and the glass and metal Regnier Center Atrium Lobby.

The Nerman Museum's permanent collection consists of works gifted by the Oppenheimers and the Oppenheimer Brothers Foundation. It also includes art from Johnson County Community College's Permanent Collection.

== Recognition ==
- Frommer's cited the Nerman Museum as a significant cultural attraction when they listed Kansas City as one of their top 10 world travel destinations for 2012.
- In April 2006, Public Art Review magazine named JCCC one of the top 10 university/college campuses for public art in America, citing the outdoor sculpture and the paintings, ceramics, photography and works on paper installed throughout the campus.
