= Lee Jung-seob =

Korean artist (1916–1956)

Lee Jung Seob
- 이중섭
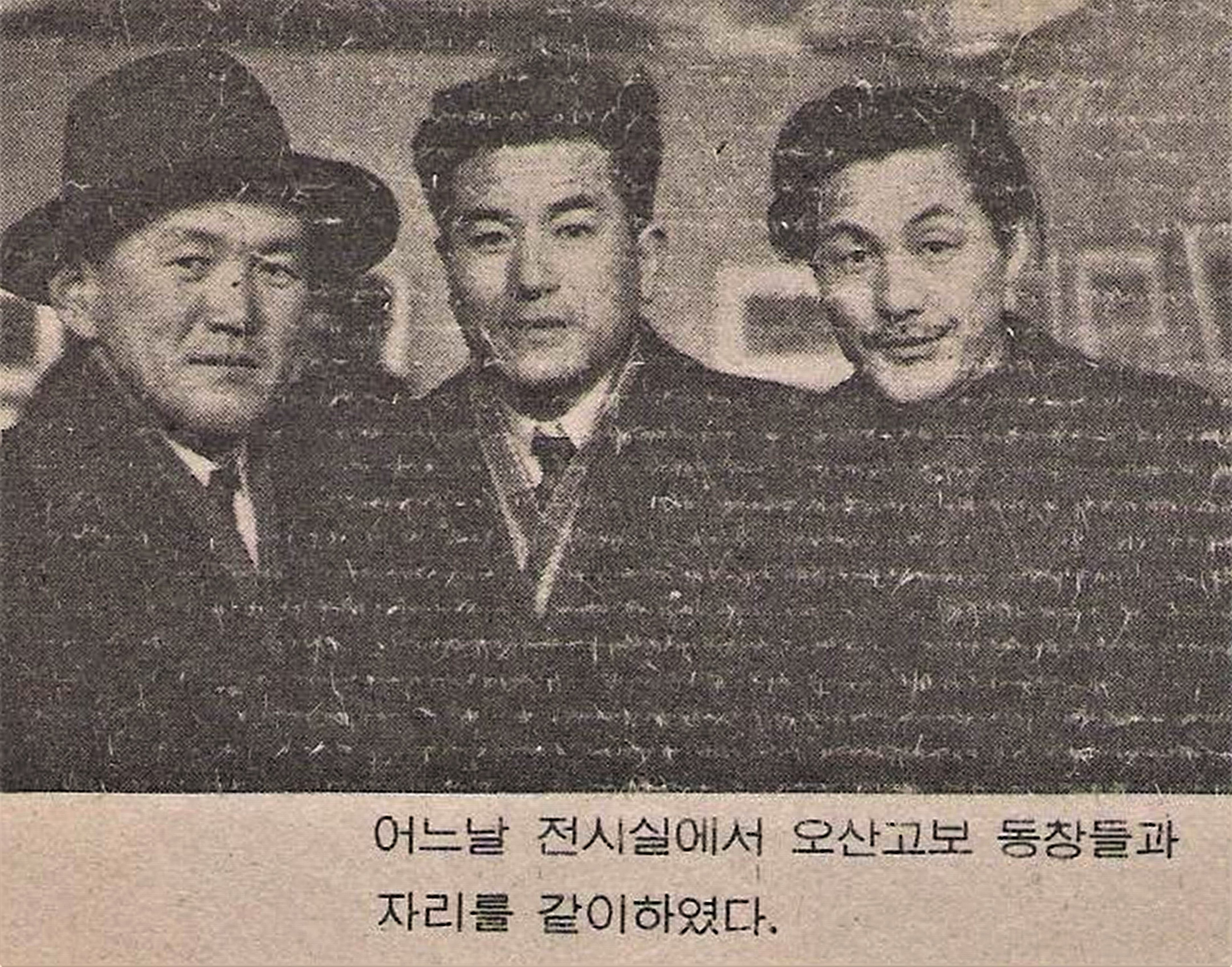
- Lee Jung seob on the right, with Kim wol Yong on the left.

Korean name
- Hangul: 이중섭
- Hanja: 李仲燮
- RR: I Jungseop
- MR: I Chungsŏp

Lee Jung-seob (April 10, 1916 in Pyeongannamdo – September 6, 1956 in Seoul) was a Korean artist most known for his oil paintings, such as White Ox.

== Life ==
=== Early years ===
Born and raised in Korea under Japanese rule, Lee was born into an affluent family in Pyongwon County, South Pyongan Province in present-day North Korea. His family owned an extensive area of land, and Lee's brother, who was twelve years older than him, ran the biggest department store at the time in Wonsan. Lee's brother assumed a paternal role after their father's death in 1918. Lee attended Jongno Primary School in Pyongyang, and found his artistic calling when he encountered replicas of Goguryeo tomb murals at the Pyongyang Prefectural Museum near the elementary school. The grand scale and vivid wall paintings mesmerized a young Lee. In 1930, he began his art studies at Osan High School in Jeongju, which was independently financed by Korean Christian nationalists whose mission was to raise next-generation leaders in opposition to Japanese colonialism. Student activists frequently led anti-colonial socialist demonstrations at school, and Lee, recognized for his various artistic talents, was greatly inspired by his high school art teacher Im Yong Ryeon. The family fortune enabled Lee to pursue his dream of becoming an artist.

In 1932, Lee entered Teikoku Art School for Occidental Painting in Japan and studied art in earnest. In 1936, he went to Tokyo to attend the Imperial Art Institute. He abruptly quit in 1937 and entered Bunka Gakuin (Japanese: 文化學院), a liberal private academy that was more fascinated with the avant-garde than Teikoku. At Bunka Gakuin, Lee showed Fauvist tendencies and a strong, free-like drawing style. It was during this time that Lee made the bull his main subject in his paintings, identifying himself with the bull in his pursuit of Korean modernism. Amid his studies, Lee joined some of his senior classmates in displaying his works at an exhibition organized by the Free Artists' Association (自由美術家協会, Jiyū Bijutsuka Kyōkai). After his exhibited works drew critical acclaim, Lee was invited to join. At Bunka Gakuin, he fell deeply in love with junior colleague Yamamoto Masako (Japanese: 山本方子, Korean name Lee Nam-deok, in hangul: 이남덕) who would later become his wife.

Despite the rising tensions of the Pacific War, Lee was relatively safe within his school boundaries, gaining a liberal education in the face of imperial militarism. Lee graduated from Bunka Gakuin in 1941 and returned home to Wonsan in 1943 as panic surrounding the war grew in Tokyo. Lee continued to paint and organize art exhibitions in Seoul and Pyongyang undeterred by the wartime emergency in Colonial Korea. In April 1945, Masako traveled to Wonsan in the midst of the bombing of Japan, and the two were married the following month. In 1946, their first child was born but suddenly died from diphtheria. At that time, Lee was preparing an exhibition and making artwork as a relatively unknown artist. The sudden death of his child greatly affected him. He sent his painting A Child Flies with a White Star, which was inspired by his loss, to the exhibition commemorating the independence of Korea in 1947.

His son Taehyun was born in 1947, and his second son, Taeseong, was born in 1949.

=== The Korean War ===
The end of Japanese occupation in Korea at the end of World War II was met with Soviet forces in northern Korea and U.S. forces in southern Korea. The communist regime soon settled in Wonsan, and Lee's brother was arrested and imprisoned. The regime also restricted Lee's works as officials monitored him closely due to his brother being a successful entrepreneur, his Japanese wife hailing from a wealthy Catholic family, and himself an artist who expressed his thoughts and ideas in his paintings.

With the start of the Korean War in 1950, Wonsan began to be bombed. Part of a mass exodus to South Korea, Lee found refuge in Busan with his wife and two sons in December of that year. Lee was forced to leave his mother and artwork behind, which is why almost none of his art produced before 1950 has survived. By this time, Lee's family became desperately poor. Finding Busan overcrowded with other refugees and seeking a warmer climate, Lee moved his family further south to Jeju Island, the very southern tip of Korea.

=== Life on Jeju ===
Lee and his family found the warm and pleasant life they hoped for in Seogwipo, Jeju, the southern coast of the island. The family spent an impoverished but mostly happy year together on the island. Lee's painting A Family on the Road (1951) shows a father leading a golden bull and a wagon with a mother and two sons tossing flowers and searching for Utopia. Despite hardships, Lee sketched and painted his surroundings, inspired by the local scenery, and gained new subject matter in seagulls, crabs, fish, the coast, and his growing children. Here, Lee developed a more simplified linear style of depicting children together with fish and crabs within a compact and abstract landscape. By the end of 1951, financial hardships on the island took their toll and the whole family was in poor health. They returned to Busan in December, wandering between refugee camps for the Japanese.

The location holds a geographical significance and meaning for many of his pieces; he clearly adored the home he found in Seogwipo. Lee created some of his best-known works during his stay on the island, including Boys, Fish, and Crab (1950), Song of the Ocean of Lost Hometown (1951), The Sun and Children (1950s), A Family Dancing Together (1950s), Children in Spring (1952-53), Children in the Seashore (1952-53).

=== Family and separation ===
Tired of destitution, Masako left for Japan with their children in July 1952 as a temporary agreement. Unable to get a visa to accompany his family, Lee became depressed and ached for his family. Lee would send letters and postcards with drawings to his wife and children, expressing his love and longing to see them again. He picked up a job as a crafts teacher and continued to work, producing paintings, magazine illustrations, and book covers, and participating in exhibitions. Most of his works produced during this time in Busan were unfortunately lost to a fire. Lee later returned to the capital of Seoul.

From around the end of the War until June 1954, Lee worked as a lecturer in Tongyeong. Relatively stable for the first time since the outbreak of the war, Lee spent his year in Tongyeong feverishly producing an abundance of art pieces, including his famous Bull series and a series of oil paintings of the beautiful Tongyeong landscape. Here, he held his first solo exhibition.

Poet Ku Sang, a close friend of Lee's, described how Lee struggled to sell his art so that he could reunite with his family in Japan; the pain and agony of losing that hope turned to Lee's self-torture and eventual mental illness. Lee drew Family of Poet Ku Sang (1955), his yearning for familial love expressed in the portrait of Ku gifting his young son a tricycle. Lee was never able to save up enough money to move and be reunited. He never met his family again except for a short meeting for 5 days in Tokyo in 1953.

In January 1955, he held a private exhibition at the Midopa Gallery in a last-ditch effort to sell his works. Despite the exhibition's success, he remained heavily in debt as he never received the money for the twenty works sold. Ku Sang helped Lee organize another final exhibition at the Gallery of the US Information Service in Daegu in April, which reaped even worse results than the one in Seoul. Lee spiraled into a deep depression and castigated himself for not only failing as his family's provider but also as an artist.

=== Death ===
He suffered from a type of schizophrenia credited to longings for his family and stress from life hardships. In his loneliness, Lee turned to alcohol and developed a severe anorexia. He continued his migratory lifestyle, moving between Seoul, Daegu, and Tongyeong until his death. He spent his final year in various hospitals and homes of friends. He worked on illustrations for literary magazines, including his River of No Return series.

On September 6, 1956, Lee died of hepatitis at age 40 alone at Seoul Red Cross Hospital. Friends of Lee had him cremated and sent some of his ashes to Masako in Japan. They then commissioned a tombstone for him at Manguri Public Cemetery in Seoul.

== Style and Works ==
=== Artistic development ===
Lee began his art studies at Osan School under the instruction of his high school teacher, Im Yong Ryeon, who studied drawing, oil painting, and historical murals at the Art Institute of Chicago (1923-26) and the Yale School of Fine Arts (1926-29). Lee inherited a love for Goguryeo tomb murals and paintings, which shone through in his vigorous line work, deep colors, circular compositions, and symbolic motifs of animals. Western-style painting was actively introduced in Pyongyang by artists returning from Japan's Tokyo School of Fine Arts. This was when Lee began to familiarize himself with modern painting techniques like watercolor, dessin, and oil painting. Under Im, Lee learned to sign his artworks in Korean while avoiding the colonial regulations on using Hangul.

In Tokyo, Lee's style was influenced by Fauvism and expressionism, though his themes were very characteristic and indigenous. His works often depicted everyday life in Korea, including scenes of rural landscapes, his family's village and island life, and traditional Korean dress. He made great contributions to the introduction of Western styles in Korea. His inspirations include George Rouault (1871-1958) and Pablo Picasso (1881-1973).

Lee always yearned to paint a large-scale mural in a public space for the enjoyment of many people, but his dreams were never realized due to the turmoil of the Korean War and its aftermath.

== Major series ==
=== Tinfoil paintings ===
Unable to afford typical art materials, Lee created an innovative new technique for making line paintings on pieces of tinfoil from cigarette packs. He used an awl to scratch lines into the tinfoil, applied paint, and then wiped away the paint so that only the etched lines were tinted. Although a flat image, the deeply indented lines gave the impression of multiple layers. The shiny, metallic surface of the tinfoil further enhanced its aesthetic effect. This specific technique draws from the tradition of inlaid Goryeo celadon or metalware inlaid with silver, pointing to Lee's deep reverence for Korean tradition. Lee supposedly produced about 300 tinfoil paintings.

His paintings range from scenes of poverty and social adversity to scenes of his happiest moments in Seogwipo, generally depicting the family he desperately longed for, happily playing with crabs, fish, and flowers. The tinfoil paintings were intended to serve as rough sketches for large murals that he dreamt of painting. This is his most famous type of work, with three of these pieces housed in the Metropolitan Museum of Art in New York, and three others on display in the Seogwipo gallery.

His tinfoil paintings include Twins (1950) and Children Playing in the Peach Garden (1954).

=== Letter paintings ===
From the time Lee was separated from his family, he regularly sent letters to his wife and children in Japan. Early letters were affectionate and full of joy, saturated with the hope that they would be reunited soon enough. Many of the letters consisted of free-flowing handwriting and delightful illustrations for his family, reflecting his deep love for them.

From the middle of 1955, however, Lee descended into despair and almost entirely stopped writing to his family. It is also said that he stopped reading the letters that his wife sent to him. An estimated sixty letters have survived, consisting of about 150 pages. These letters, such as Artist Drawing His Family (1953-54), hold important documentary value, revealing the relationship between Lee's daily life and his art, and are important independent art pieces in themselves.

=== Children ===
Much of Lee's subject matter focused on children, mainly his own, drawing from the iconography of children playing together on celadon vessels from the Goryeo period. Small sculptures of baby Buddha also served as inspiration for his motifs of children. After the death of his first child, Lee buried with him a drawing of children playing so that he could play with other children in the afterlife.

Despite his years of strife, poverty, transience, and warfare, Lee produced paintings that laughed at the harshness of reality, expressing the blithe, childlike beauty of happy days spent with his family.

Works include Family with Chickens (1954-55), Twins (1950), The Sun and Children (1950s), and Children Playing in the Peach Garden (1954), oil on paper.

=== Cows ===
Throughout his life, Lee created numerous paintings centered on the subject of the 'cow,' a creature that held a special place in his artistic universe. The cow speaks to the deep roots of the Korean people and is a modernist reflection of self. The white bull in particular came to symbolize Korea and the white-robed Korean people. Scholars and historians have argued that this subject matter was an especially bold choice during a time when Korean motifs were actively repressed by colonial Japan. After the war, he returned to bull paintings, imbued with confidence and strong will.

Lee used vivid colors and strong brushstrokes in Bull (1953), a product of his deep longing for his family, to evoke the determined hope Lee held in his heart for a reunion. Lee once said, "When I look into a cow's big eyes, I know happiness."

Other paintings include White Ox (1954), A White Bull (1953-54), Gray Bull (1956)

== Lee Jung Seob Art Gallery ==
In 1995, the Lee Jung Seob Art Gallery was built in his honor at the center of the so-called "Lee Jung-Seob's Art Street" (a part of Olle Route 6) in Seogwipo, Jeju. The museum grounds begin on a path surrounded by lush vines and flora at the bottom of a hill leading to the thatched roof house where Lee and his family lived after arriving in Seogwipo. Another path from the house through a vegetable garden leads to the museum.

A reproduction of his piece Fantasy of Seogwipo (1951), showing birds and people living in harmony on a warm day, while Korean peaches hang heavy and sweet from the treetops above, is on display at the gallery. The gallery holds 11 original works by Lee, a whole floor of reproductions, and many of his original letters to his wife. Due to Lee's rise in popularity over the years, the monetary value of his work has skyrocketed, making it difficult for the museum to acquire pieces for its collection. Part of the second floor occasionally exhibits works by modern Korean artists, many of them Jeju natives.

== Reputation and legacy ==
A posthumous exhibition held in Lee's honor in 1957, drew great public attention to his artworks. Lee became the first Korean to have an art piece represented in a permanent collection of the Museum of Modern Art in New York.

Lee is considered one of the most important artists in Korea. He wished to be known as a painter of the Korean people and reflected unique Korean modernism while still realizing the traditional aesthetics of his country. His works portray an individual's hopes and desires in times of oppressive violence, poverty, and desperation. The story of his life reminds viewers of the devastating effects of war on individuals and families.

On April 10, 2012, Google celebrated Lee Jung-Seob's 96th birthday with a Google Doodle that featured one of his iconic "Bull" paintings.

== Paintings ==
Works of Lee Jung Seob
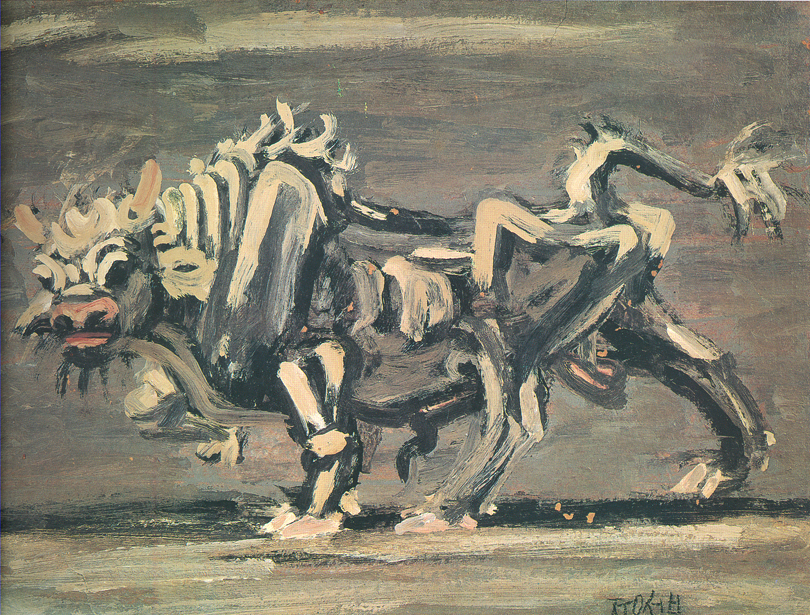
White Ox (1954)

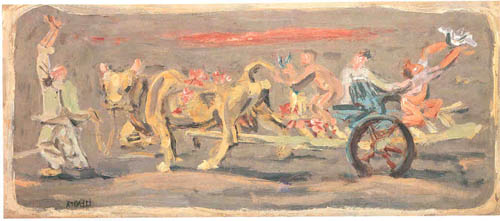
Family Leaving the Streets (1950s)

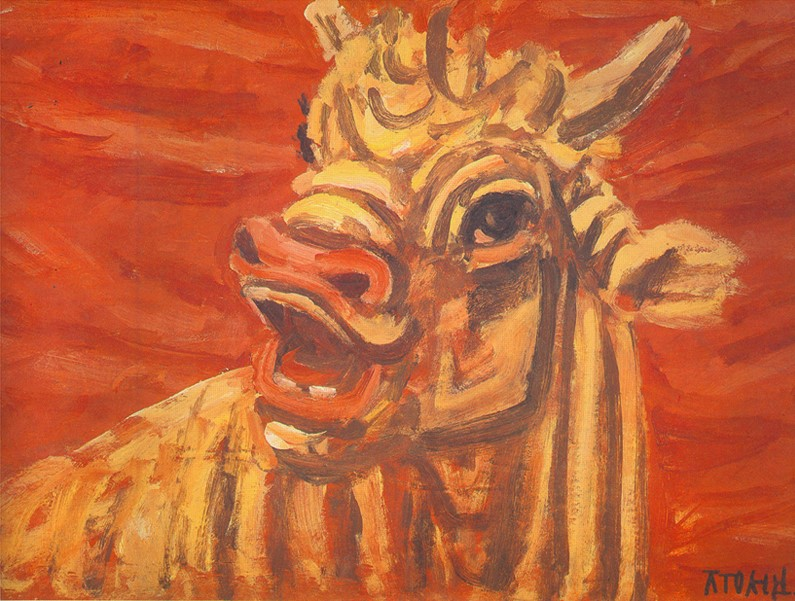
Bull (1950s)

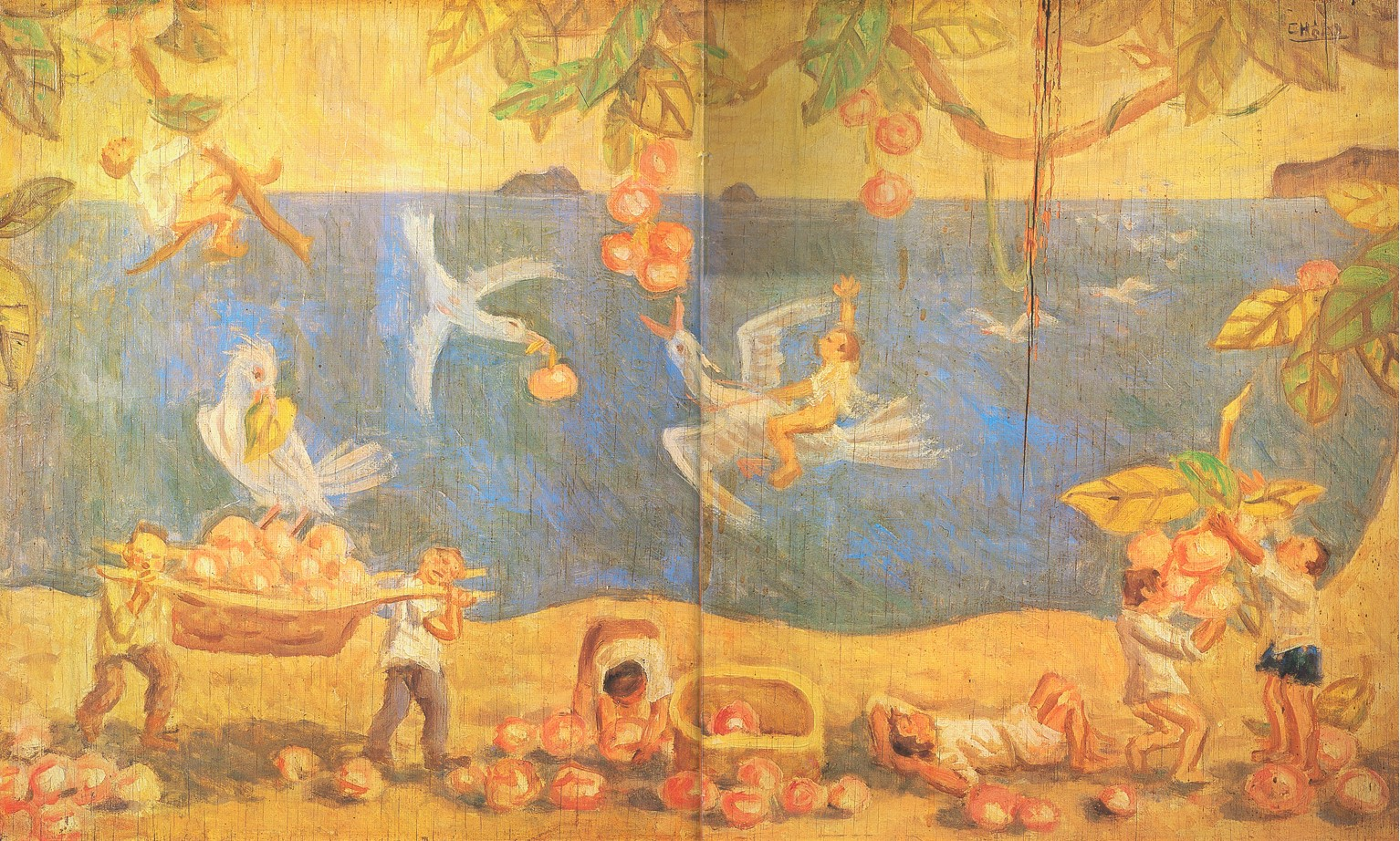
Fantasy of Seogwipo (1951)

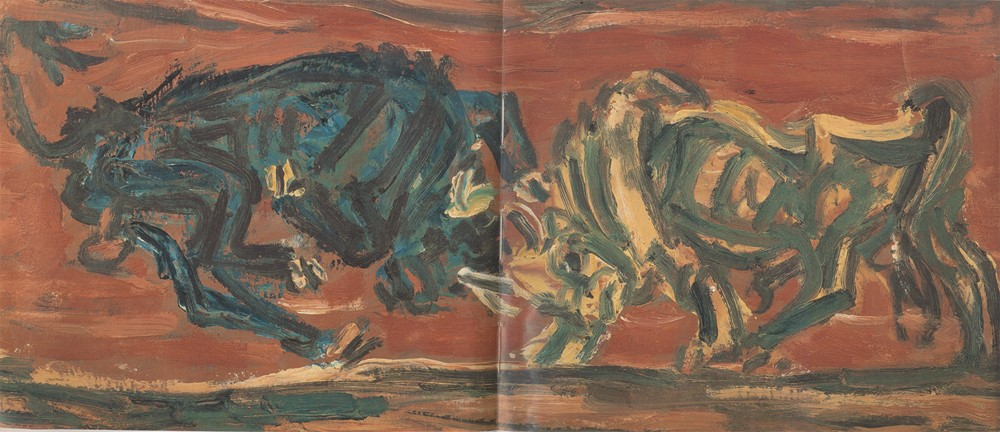
Fighting Ox (1950s)

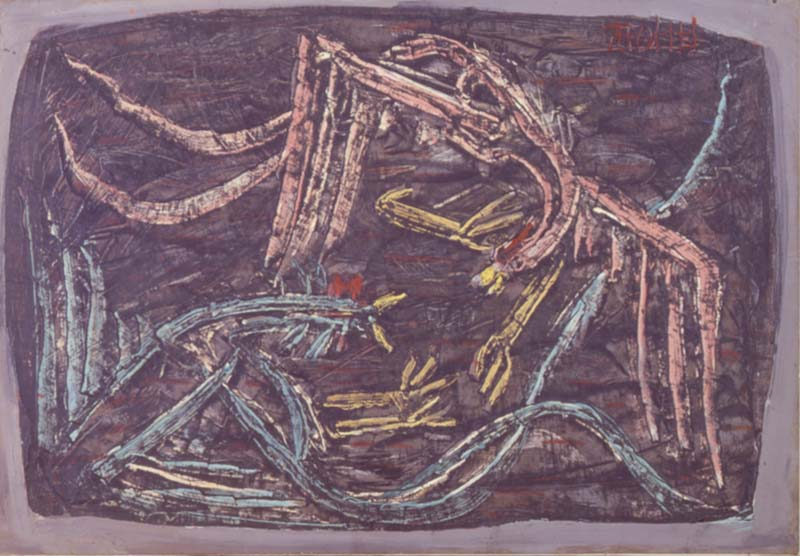
Tugye (Fighting Chickens, 1955)

Lee Jung Seob has produced many works during his lifetime. Some of his paintings include:

- White Ox – 흰 소, 1954 (exhibited in Museum of Modern Art)
- Fighting Ox – 싸우는 소
- Fish and the Kids – 물고기와 아이들, 1950
- The Family and the Dove – 가족과 비둘기, 1956

== See also ==
- List of Korean painters
- Korean art
