= New patrons =

Series of art projects since the 1990s

The New Patrons (French: Nouveaux commanditaires) are a series of art projects initiated in the 1990s following a protocol drawn up by Belgian artist François Hers. The terms "Nouveaux commanditaires" or "New Patrons" refer to the protocol established in 1990, the subsequent cultural policy movement, the resulting artworks, and the various mediation organisations responsible for overseeing the projects internationally. New Patrons are the individuals who initiate the commissioning of an artistic project.

The protocol followed by the New Patrons outlines the main stages in developing an artistic project conceived as democratic in nature and originating from a commission by citizens, residents, employees, or any other group with a motivated interest in the creation of a work of art.

The initiative was first established in France under the impetus of the Fondation de France, which supported it from 1990 to 2022. It was introduced in Belgium in 2000, followed by Germany, Spain, Italy, Switzerland, and several other countries. Through several hundred projects, the movement has engaged numerous prominent figures in contemporary art, including Daniel Buren, Luciano Fabro, Christian Boltanski, Harun Farocki, Angela Bulloch, Michelangelo Pistoletto, Wim Delvoye, Jean-Michel Othoniel, and Erwin Wurm, as well as contributors from architecture, music, and design. The protocol has also influenced sociologists, philosophers, and art historians, and has been the subject of sustained scholarly research, notably by Bruno Latour, Vinciane Despret, Laurence Bertrand-Dorléac, Joseph Koerner, and Jean-Michel Frodon.

== History ==
As early as 1963, conceptual artist François Hers proposed an approach to art that extended beyond museums, drawing inspiration from the ideas of the Dada movement to establish new relationships between society, artists, and artistic production. Hers' work reflects this ambition, and has often been described as "wild". In 1990, Bernard Latarjet, then president of the Fondation de France, asked Hers to establish a new cultural framework. Hers proposed a mode of action based on artistic requests emanating from society itself. This proposal led to the creation of the Protocole des Nouveaux commanditaires in 1991, encouraging collaboration between citizens and artists.

The protocol introduced by Hers relies on a network of mediators—essentially curators—who facilitate collaboration between patrons and artists. It revives the collaborative and experimental spirit seen in the conceptual works of John Cage, Fluxus, and George Brecht, as well as the concept of participatory art found in conceptual art. This approach challenges traditional power structures, redefining interactions between artists and the public, while retaining intermediaries such as galleries and curators to facilitate social connection. The audience thus gains independence and agency. Central to this dynamic is the artwork itself, which becomes a focal point for collective participation.

Hers published the first formal text of the protocol in 2001, followed in 2012 by a joint publication with Xavier Douroux, Art without Capitalism. Two further books significantly expanded discussions of the New Patrons. In 2013, under the supervision of a committee chaired by Bruno Latour, Faire art comme on fait société assembled 47 contributions from across multiple disciplines. In 2017, an English-language edition, Reclaiming Art – Reshaping Democracy, provided an anglophone perspective, using case studies of existing projects to explore the emergence of public art commissions.

The first artistic projects from the Nouveaux commanditaires programme took place in Burgundy in 1991. Xavier Douroux, director of Dijon's Le Consortium, served as mediator between patrons and artists.

The protocol later expanded beyond France, first to Belgium in 2000. It was introduced in Germany in the late 2000s under the initiative of Sigrid Pawelke.

From 2002 onward, mediators from participating European countries organised under the Société internationale des Nouveaux commanditaires (International Society of the New Patrons).

In 2017, Hers proposed expanding the initiative to philosophy and the humanities in order to address contemporary cultural and social issues, through a programme entitled Nouveaux commanditaires – Sciences, supported by the Fondation de France and other institutions.

In 2022, the Fondation de France, which had until then coordinated and accredited the mediating structures in France and funded projects in France and abroad, announced its withdrawal from the programme. Responsibility was transferred to the French Ministry of Culture. A new French non-profit organisation, the Société des Nouveaux commanditaires en arts et sciences, was subsequently established, supported by both the Fondation de France and the Ministry of Culture.

=== The protocol of the New Patrons ===
In his Letter to a Friend, François Hers suggests the emergence of a new chapter in the history of art: an "art of democracy" succeeding the era of modern art. He argues that contemporary conditions make such a development possible, building on the achievements of modernity that began with the Renaissance and continued into the 1960s.

During this long period, artists played a significant role in shaping individual identity and expanding expressive possibilities, contributing to new ways of perceiving the world. Hers argues that these advances supported the emergence of democracy and the development of science and technology.

The Protocol of the New Patrons calls for artistic creation to arise not only from artists or elite commissioners, but directly from society through active dialogue with artists. This democratisation of art is enabled by the freedom of form gained over centuries of artistic experimentation, allowing artists to engage with contemporary cultural issues.

The Protocol also clarifies the roles and responsibilities of each party: citizens (the New Patrons) articulate the rationale for artistic commissions; artists create works in response; politicians and patrons support the initiatives; and philosophers and researchers analyse the issues involved.

In late 2010, the initial artistic protocol was complemented by a specific protocol for the Nouveaux commanditaires – Sciences programme.

=== Development in the scientific sector ===
The Protocol of the New Patrons, initially devised for artistic creation, was extended to scientific research in 2013. A new protocol invites citizens to become patrons of scientific projects, enabling them to participate actively in research and development. As with artistic projects, patron-citizens express needs, concerns, or interests, and scientists work with them to develop responses. This approach seeks to promote civic engagement, support dialogue between scientists and local communities, and ensure that scientific research responds to societal needs and values. By extending the New Patrons' protocol to scientific inquiry, the programme offers a model for participatory democracy in science.

== Contributing figures ==
Around 500 artists from various disciplines—including sculptors, painters, visual artists, video artists, designers, architects, composers, writers and illustrators— from every continent have received commissions for one or more artistic projects from New Patrons.

The following is a non-exhaustive, alphabetical list of artists or collectives who have produced at least one work within the framework of the Protocol of the New Patrons:

- Vito Acconci
- Elisabeth Ballet
- Shigeru Ban
- Robert Barry
- Cécile Bart
- Patrick Berger
- Bigert & Bergström
- Christian Boltanski
- Céleste Boursier-Mougenot
- Goran Bregović
- Lee Bul
- Angela Bulloch
- Balthasar Burkhard
- Jean-Marc Bustamante
- Édith Canat de Chizy
- Alexandre Chemetoff
- Sandro Chia
- Claude Closky
- Delphine Coindet
- Matali Crasset
- Anouk De Clercq
- Pierre de Meuron
- Hervé Di Rosa
- Wim Delvoye
- Maryline Desbiolles
- Bechara El-Khoury
- Luciano Fabro
- Harun Farocki
- Sylvie Fleury
- Philippe Forest
- Michel François
- Yona Friedman
- Gloria Friedmann
- Hamish Fulton
- Giuseppe Gabellone
- Anya Gallaccio
- Martino Gamper
- Liam Gillick
- Andy Goldsworthy
- Dominique Gonzalez-Foerster
- Peter Halley
- Camille Henrot
- Pierre Henry
- Jacques Herzog
- Thomas Houseago
- Jacques Jouet
- Tadashi Kawamata
- Jan Kopp
- David Lang
- Bertrand Lavier
- Claude Lévêque
- Michael Lin
- Lani Maestro
- Annette Messager
- Michel Mossessian
- Olivier Mosset
- Jean-Luc Moulène
- Tania Mouraud
- Antoni Muntadas
- Maurizio Nannucci
- Richard Nonas
- Melik Ohanian
- Lucy Orta
- Jorge Orta
- Jean-Michel Othoniel
- Jorge Pardo
- Philippe Parreno
- Simon Patterson
- Yan Pei-Ming
- Bruno Peinado
- Carmen Perrin
- Michelangelo Pistoletto
- Rudy Ricciotti
- Robin Rimbaud
- Ugo Rondinone
- Martha Rosler
- Ágatha Ruiz de la Prada
- Claude Rutault
- Sarkis
- Jean-Louis Schoellkopf
- Ettore Spalletti
- Barbara Steiner
- Superflex
- Niele Toroni
- Tatiana Trouvé
- Oscar Tuazon
- Joëlle Tuerlinckx
- Felice Varini
- Joana Vasconcelos
- Xavier Veilhan
- Didier Vermeiren
- Jean-Luc Vilmouth
- Ulla von Brandenburg
- Gary Webb
- Erwin Wurm
- Rémy Zaugg

=== Research, reflection and academic work ===
Due to its associative, collaborative and at times democratic process—where the initiative to commission a work may come from any individual and is considered both original and innovative in contrast to conventional art-world mechanisms—the Protocol of the New Patrons and its projects since the 1990s have been the subject of research and publications by numerous academics across a range of disciplines.

In art history, contributors include Meyer Schapiro and Martin Warnke. In philosophy, scholars such as Bruno Latour, Heinz Wismann and Krzysztof Pomian have engaged with the Protocol.

Philosophers of science, including Vinciane Despret and Isabelle Stengers, as well as economist Frédéric Lordon, have also contributed to academic discussions of the initiative.

== Major projects ==
=== In contemporary art ===
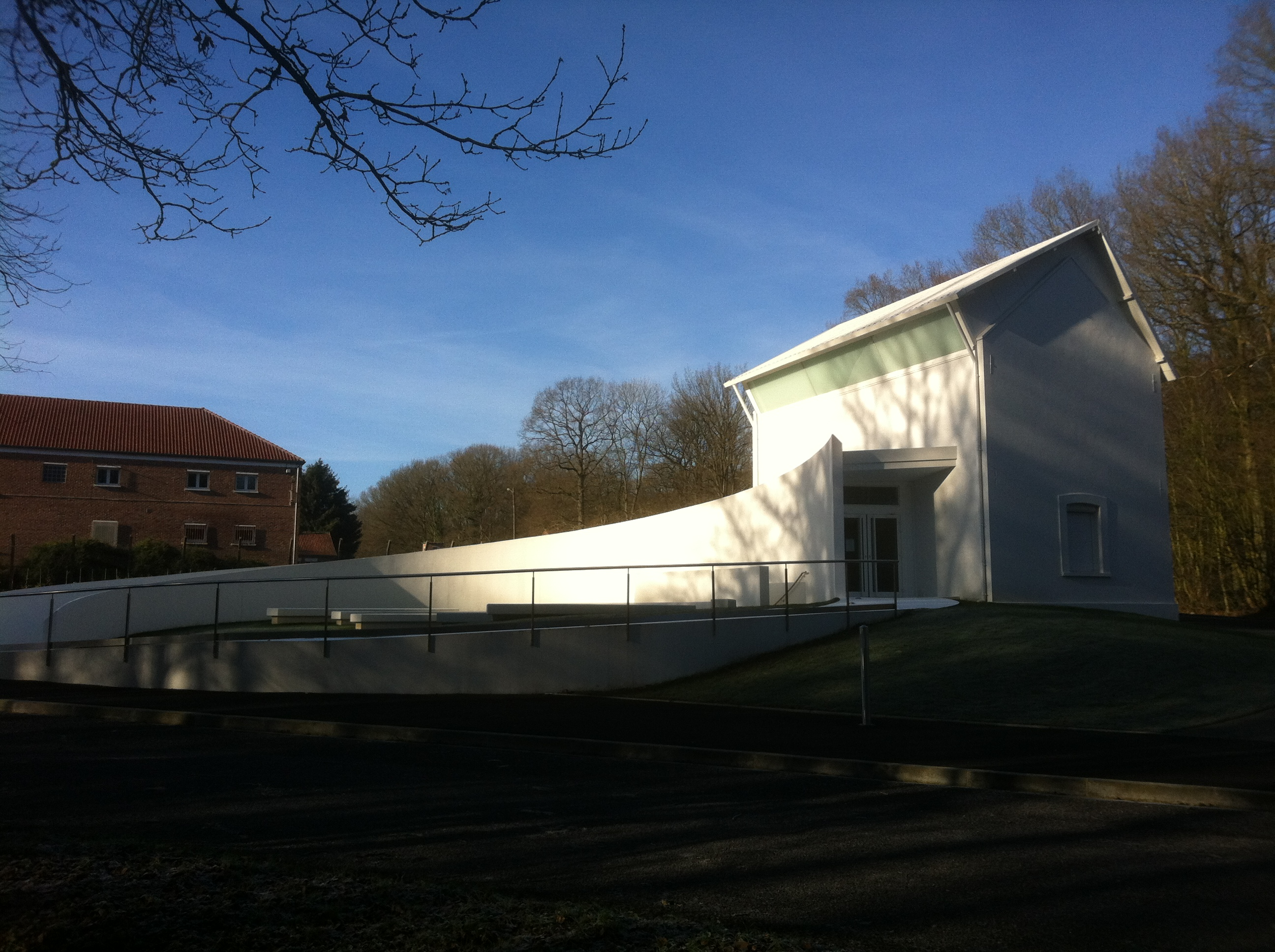
The Maison forestière Wilfred-Owen (2011) by Simon Patterson, dedicated to Wilfred Owen, commissioned by the mayor and inhabitants of the town of Ors (France).

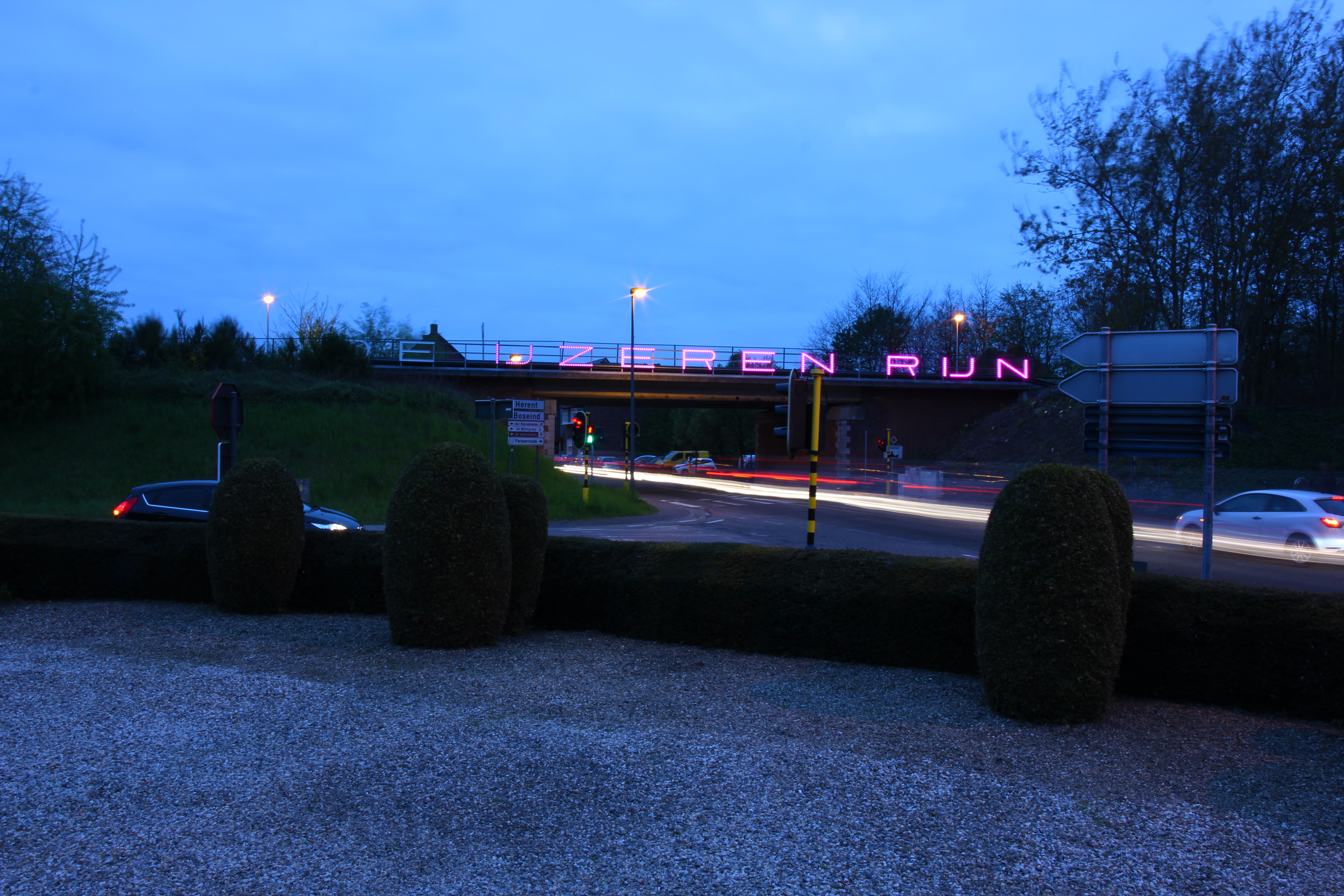
John Körmeling's IJzeren Rijn (2017) installed on a bridge of the Iron Rhine in Pelt, commissioned by the inhabitants of the former municipality of Neerpelt (Belgium).

==== La Salle des Départs, Departure and Channel of Flight ====
The Salle des Départs is a major work by Italian artist Ettore Spalletti, developed in collaboration with Guido Fanti. It was installed in 1996 at the Raymond Poincaré Hospital in Garches (Hauts-de-Seine, France).

The project originated with Dr François Paraire and Prof Michel Durigon of the hospital's pathological anatomy department, who sought to renovate the morgue's departure room, where families bid farewell to deceased relatives.

Spalletti conceived a total environment marked by symbolic variations of blue evoking the celestial and the eternal. Black and white Carrara marble elements punctuate this contemplative space, offering a dignified setting for bereaved families.

Two musical compositions, Departure by David Lang and Channel of Flight by Robin Rimbaud, were commissioned to accompany the space.

The Salle des Départs seeks to address how death is approached in hospitals and society by transforming a clinical mortuary space into a humane public environment.

The closure of Garches Hospital, expected in 2024, threatens the future of the work. Authorities and members of the artistic community have called for its preservation and reinstallation in a new medical facility.

==== Colonna di Genk ====
The Colonna di Genk ("Pillar of Genk"), erected in Genk (Limburg, Belgium), is the final work of Italian artist Luciano Fabro, who died in 2007.

The column embodies the mining heritage of Belgian Limburg and symbolises the longstanding links between local communities and Italy. Commissioned in 2005, the sculpture represents the resilience of local residents in the face of the mining industry's decline, the social challenges experienced by Italian immigrant workers, and subsequent economic difficulties.

Made from Italian Carrara marble, the Doric column reflects the deep connection between Genk and the Italian mining communities that contributed to the region's industrial growth.

Inaugurated on 1 May 2008, ten months after Fabro's death, the Colonna di Genk stands as a testament to the artist's commitment to social cohesion and embodies the city's motto, "Samen sterk" ("Strong together").

=== In architecture ===
==== Les Bogues du Blat ====
Les Bogues du Blat is a group of social housing units designed by architect Patrick Bouchain in Beaumont, Ardèche (France). Initiated to counter rural flight, the project features wooden-frame houses inspired by local chestnut structures, reflecting the region's heritage.

Developed through a participatory process involving residents, future residents and elected officials, the project reflects a collaborative and sustainable approach to architecture. Construction began in 2012 and emphasised environmentally friendly materials and community living, closely linked to the Monts d'Ardèche Regional Natural Park.

=== In design ===
==== Le Blé en herbe primary school ====
Located in the town of Trébédan in Brittany (France), the primary school École Le Blé en Herbe was designed by Matali Crasset.

The school emerged through collaboration between the municipality, residents and local educational authorities. Planning began in 2007, when the community decided to renovate its outdated school building. Teachers, parents and local officials sought to revitalise the village and provide stimulating learning environments.

Crasset conceived the school as a complete work of art. The architecture and furnishings were designed to foster pupils' autonomy, creativity and development, expressed through bright colours and numerous shared spaces.

== Organisation ==
International Society of the New Patrons
- Société internationale des Nouveaux commanditaires
- Abbreviation: SiNc
- Formation: 2002; 24 years ago (Dijon); 19 December 2023; 2 years ago (Paris)
- Founder: François Hers
- Founded at: Paris
- Type: International non-profit Organisation
- Legal status: AISBL
- Headquarters: Avenue Louise
- Location: City of Brussels, Belgium
- Members: 7 national organisations
- Official language: French, English
- Secretary General: Thérèse Legierse
- President: Alexander Koch
- Website: http://nouveauxcommanditaires.eu

=== In France ===
Between 1991 and 2022, the Fondation de France oversaw and funded the development of New Patrons projects. In France, the Fondation de France recognised a number of organisations and individuals as "accredited mediators", responsible for mediating New Patrons projects within a specific region or, in some cases, within a particular artistic discipline. These include Le Consortium in Burgundy and Les Abattoirs in Occitania. The Fondation de France also coordinated the artistic projects associated with the extension of tramway line 3b in northern Paris.

Since 2020, the mediator associations have operated independently from the Fondation de France, with accreditation now overseen by the newly created Société des Nouveaux commanditaires en arts et sciences, a non-profit association founded in Lille.

Mediators are generally curators with extensive knowledge of the art world and of their local context.

=== Outside France ===
Outside France, mediation structures are established by national organisations. Internationally, they are grouped under the International Society of the New Patrons (Société internationale des Nouveaux commanditaires, SiNc), founded in Dijon in 2002 and established as an international non-profit association in Brussels in 2023.

As of 2024, SiNc includes the following members:

Founding members of the Société internationale des Nouveaux commanditaires
Country	Name	Legal form	Founded
Germany	Die Gesellschaft der Neuen Auftraggeber	gGmbH	2007
Belgium	de Nieuwe opdrachtgevers – les Nouveaux commanditaires	ASBL	2000
Cameroon	Société des Nouveaux commanditaires du Cameroun	OBNL	2016
Spain	Concomitentes	Asociación Civil	2018
France	Société des Nouveaux commanditaires en arts et sciences	Association loi de 1901	2020
Italy	a.titolo	Associazione culturale	2001
Switzerland	Société suisse des Nouveaux commanditaires	Swiss association	2014

Funding is most often provided by the Fondation de France and by foundations operating under its umbrella, particularly the Fondation Carasso, as well as through public contributions. In France, funding also comes from the Ministry of Culture and the regional FRAC contemporary art funds; in Dutch-speaking Belgium from the Flemish Community; and in Germany from the Kulturstiftung des Bundes. In some cases, budgets are supported by the "1% for art" mechanism.

=== Name and brand ===
"Nouveaux commanditaires" is a registered trademark of the International Society of the New Patrons in the Benelux and of the Fondation de France in France.

The term has been translated into several languages. In some cases, new expressions were created to evoke the idea of a "patron", while in other cases existing terms were adopted:

- Nuovi committenti (Italian)
- Nuevos comanditarios (Spanish)
- Nieuwe opdrachtgevers (Dutch)
- Neue Auftraggeber (German)
- Komanditario berriak (Basque)
- Taiteen Uudet Tukijat (Finnish)

In its international communications, the International Society of the New Patrons uses the English term "New Patrons".

=== Academic programmes ===
Two academic programmes in France focus on the New Patrons and on mediation in contemporary art.

In 2010, inspired by the New Patrons protocol, Bruno Latour founded a programme in political arts at Sciences Po Paris called SPEAP (Sciences Po Expérimentation Arts Politiques, later Sciences Po École des Arts Politiques). Under Latour's direction, the programme evolved into the Master of Experimentation in Arts and Politics, which subsequently became the one-year Master in Political Arts at Sciences Po's School of Public Affairs. In 2023, SPEAP joined the newly created Maison des Arts et de la Création. The programme focuses on artistic and academic experimentation and also provides training in curation and artistic mediation, particularly in the context of public art created under public or political institutions.

In 2020, the University of Lille launched a University Diploma titled "Building art as building society — Mediation-production in the contemporary arts", in collaboration with the French Society of the New Patrons in Arts and Sciences. The programme was later incorporated into the Master of Arts curriculum in the exhibition and production of contemporary artworks.

== Bibliography ==
- Vinciane Despret, Les Morts à l'œuvre, Paris: La Découverte, 2023.
- Émilie Hache, Frédéric Lordon, et al., Reclaiming Art / Reshaping Democracy – The New Patrons & Participatory Art, Dijon: Les presses du réel, 2017.
- François Hers, The protocol, Dijon: Les presses du réel, 2002.
- François Hers, Xavier Douroux, Art without Capitalism, Dijon: Les presses du réel, 2013.
- François Hers, Letter to a Friend about the New patrons, translated by Emmelene Landon, Dijon: Les presses du réel, 2016.
- François Hers, Operation Nouveaux commanditaires, Dijon: Les presses du réel, 2023.
