= Sigrid Pawelke =

- Born: 18 October 1971 (age 55); Regensburg, Germany
- Education: MA, theater studies, Sorbonne Nouvelle Paris III, 1996, PhD in performance studies and art history, Friedrich Alexander University of Erlangen-Nuremberg, 2000 Affiliation, Institute of Fine Arts, New York University, 1997–2000
- Known for: Considering the connection between Bauhaus and Black Mountain College
- Notable work: Influences of the Bauhaus stage in the USA (2005)
- Parent(s): Gerlinde Hefner; Rainer Pawelke

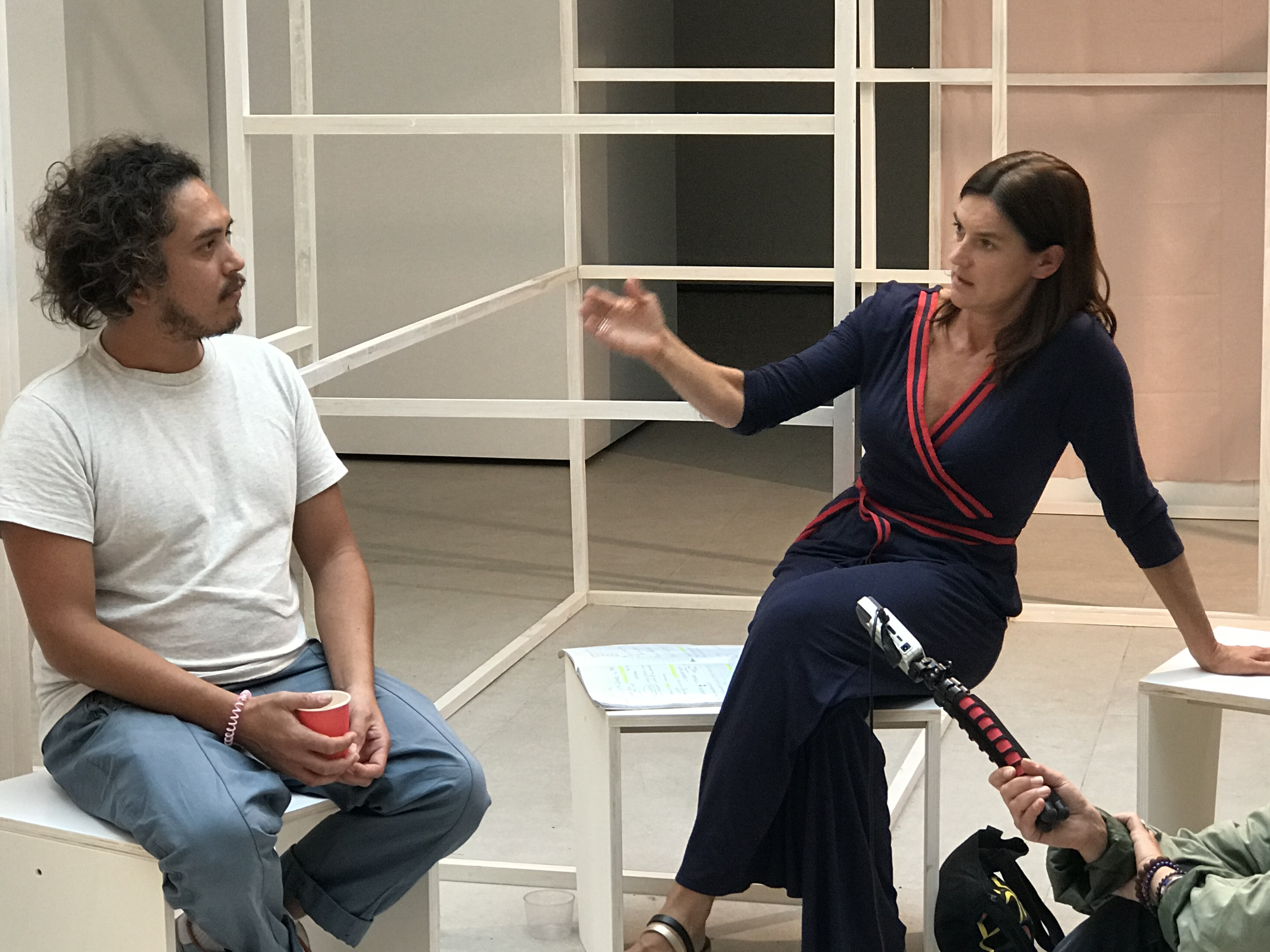
Sigrid Pawelke and Arjuna Neuman in 2020

Sigrid Pawelke is a German curator and a performance and art historian, regarded as one of the leading experts of the Bauhaus Stage and its influences on the arts in North America. In 2015 she was part of the Black Mountain show at the Hamburger Bahnhof, Museum of Contemporary Art Berlin, contributing fifteen film interviews of former Black Mountain students (such as Ati Gropius, choreographer Anna Halprin and Yvonne Rainer). In 2019 she created with Dimitri Chamblas “Unlimited Bodies”, a seven-day interdisciplinary experiment inspired by the radical pedagogies of the Bauhaus for the biennial “PERFORMA 19” in New York.

Born in Germany, she lives in France where she currently teaches art history and performance at the School of Visual Arts in Tourcoing. She has worked with artists like Lucy Orta, Jochen Gerz and Michelangelo Pistoletto and has organized workshops with choreographers VA Wölfl, Philippe Decouflé, Angelin Preljocaj, Rachid Ouramdane, Marcos Morau, Niv Sheinfeld and Oren Laor, among others.

== Career ==
Sigrid Pawelke has been trained in Dance and Performance and is a Tamalpa Graduate of Anna Halprin’s Life/Art Process. She studied Art History, theater and film studies at the University of Erlangen-Nuremberg and at the Sorbonne Nouvelle Paris III, and was a research fellow at the Institute of Fine Arts at New York University with Linda Nochlin.

She received her Doctor of Art History and Performance Studies (PhD) in 2000 for her thesis entitled "Influences of the Bauhaus Stage in the USA". It investigates the connection between the Bauhaus stage, avant-garde performance and Postmodern dance in the US, focusing particularly on aesthetic and pedagogical aspects. Pawelke examines the interdisciplinary ideas fostered by the Bauhaus, that were expressed in the programs at Black Mountain College, and that led for instance to the emergence of John Cage's first "Happening". Her work was the first study to consider the relationship between the European Bauhaus and the American experimental stage in rigorous scholarly detail.

Pawelke has taught performance art in theory and practice at Sorbonne Nouvelle III, the University of Paris VIII, the Parsons School of Design Paris, and Art History at the School of Visual Arts in Aix-en-Provence. Pawelke is active internationally, and regularly gives talks, lectures and workshops in cities such as Beirut, Berlin, Budapest, Rouen, Stockholm, Vilnius. She has been a guest speaker at the Centre Pompidou in Paris, the Kunst-Werke Institute for Contemporary Art Berlin, the Bauhaus Dessau. and the PRATT Institute New York. In 2022 she directed two workshops « Together – Creative Collective Body Processes in the Anthropocene » at the Università Ca’ Foscari in Venice (footnote) and « Wake up – body and biosphere » in Ypres, Belgium.

Pawelke has overseen projects and produced programs for the Fondation de France, the Bauhaus Dessau Foundation, Alfred Toepfer Foundation, and the Federal Agency for Civic Education Germany. Between 2006 and 2010 she initiated and developed the New Patrons program (Nouveaux commanditaires) in Germany. In collaboration with six high-profile curators and major art institutions (i.e. Deichtorhallen Hamburg) she advanced the European platform "New Patrons" from France, Belgium and Italy into Germany with the aim of initiating art of-and-for civil society.

Pawelke has come to specialize in art projects in the urban realm and the ecological sphere. She worked with artists such as Lucy and Jorge Orta, Jochen Gerz and Michelangelo Pistoletto at institutions as at PS1 Center of Contemporary Art in New York, the Fondazione Pistoletto in Biella and is especially interested in the social and ecological relevance and impact of her projects and interventions. In 2020 during the nomadic European biennial Manifesta 13 in Marseille, Pawelke curated five round tables on art, society and ecology as part of the Infinite Village by Cora von Zezschwitz and Tilman.

== Selected publications ==
- 1996 Numerous articles and reviews about dance and film for "magazine ARTE", Paris. French German culture channel
- 2002 We could be anywhere, I know this place, Lettre International, September 2002, Berlin
- 2005 Influences of the Bauhaus stage in the USA: A study on the connection of the Bauhaus stage, American stage performance and Postmodern Dance, focusing on aesthetic and pedagogical aspects; 293 p., Roderer Verlag
- 2008 Art and civil society – current paradigm and new pathways, Stiftung Mitarbeit, Wegweiser Bürgergesellschaft
- 2014 Black Mountain College: Art, Democracy, Utopia; Alan Speller, Black Mountain College: Art education and Avant-garde, Critique d’art

== Selected conferences ==
- 2003 – Speaker: "NO FUTURE – the world and politics in the ANTHOLOGY OF ART", Museum of Fine Arts (Budapest)
- 2003 – Speaker: "The arts and the city: innovative approaches", École nationale supérieure d'architecture de Paris-Malaquais
- 2009 – Curator: "European Conference of "New Patrons" New Patrons: A proposal for promoting art in civil society, Kunstwerke Berlin, Germany. With Bruno Latour and Chantal Mouffe amongst others; In connection with a three-day European Seminar on "New Patrons", Siggen, Germany. October 9, 2009, Kunst-Werke Institute for Contemporary Art Berlin, Germany
- 2009 – Speaker: "Open Engagement, Commissioning and Producing Art for the Public Realm", Marabou Parken and Polska Institutet Stockholm, Sweden. Title of the talk: Creative planning, artistic brief and New Patrons. 25–28 September 2009
- 2010 – Co-curator and speaker: "The Power of Imagination" Conference, Bauhaus Dessau. Title of the talk: "Pedagogy and Bauhaus stage: The basis for performance at Black Mountain College"
- 2010 – Speaker: "The Impact of Cultural and Citizenship Education on Social Cohesion", Vilnius. Title of the talk: Culture as a Driving Force for Social and Political Participation on the basis of the art commission program New Patrons. Title of the workshop: Culture as a Driving Force for Social and Political Participation: How Could Social Realities Be Formed and Changed Through the Arts?
- 2011 – Speaker: "Performance at Black Mountain College – An American Bauhaus", Public Talk, Centre Pompidou, Paris, France, 23 November 2011
- 2012 – Curator and speaker: "Back and forth: From life to art – John Cage", Aix en Provence and Alphabetville Marseille, France: A theme week on Cage for students and a broader audience addressing the issue of music, scores, chance and protocols of John Cage interacting with the educational institutions as Black Mountain College
- 2015 – Curator and speaker: "Dance and Visual Arts towards New Explorations", Aix en Provence, France: Two-day-conference bringing together 14 interdisciplinary experts to explore the role of stage and especially dance, and how it opens into multidisciplinary artistic fields; 9–10 March 2015 at Ecole supérieure d’art Aix en Provence, France
- 2015 – Curator and speaker: "Migration – Strategies of Creation": Two-day-conference about the migration crisis and its impact, bringing together migrants, artist, experts and scientists to develop creative strategies to tackle the issue in artistic ways. Plus a day of workshop with Tanja Ostojić, 14–16 December 2016 at Ecole supérieure d’art Aix en Provence, France
- 2016 – Curator and speaker: "Art and Biosphere – Birth of a Consciousness", Aix en Provence, France: Three-day-conference bringing together more than 20 international artists, designers, architects, experts and researchers and half a dozen institutions from all over France facilitating interdisciplinary exchange, 20–22 April 2016 at Ecole supérieure d’art Aix en Provence, France
- 2016 – Speaker: "The score as a source of creation and the creation as a score at the Bauhaus and in the work of Anna and Lawrence Halprin", lecture and body workshop about the RSVP Cycle of Anna and Lawrence Halprin, ESADHaR, School of visual arts and design Le Havre-Rouen, France
- 2019 – Speaker: “The bauhaus stage in America”, part of the exhibition “Bauhaus und Amerika. Experimente in Licht und Bewegung”, Landesmuseum Münster, Germany
- 2019 – Speaker: “A contextual and environmental pedagogy: Experiments in the Environment by Anna and Lawrence Halprin”, Symposium “100 years of Bauhaus”, ENSA school of architecture, Toulouse, France
- 2019 – Speaker: “The Weird Bauhaus and performative innovation”, “The Bauhaus stage”, PRATT Institute, art history, New York, United States
- 2020 – Speaker: “Female artists at Manifesta 13 in Marseille”, European nomadic biennial, Public Talk, Aix en Provence, France
- 2022 – Speaker: “Black Mountain – Live art and the art to live”, Università Ca’ Foscari,

Venice, Italy

== Residencies ==
- 2003 – Researcher, speaker and curator: "Urban Walk" and exhibition: Urban problematic in post war Beirut, BEIRUT STREET FESTIVAL, ZICOhouse, Lebanon
- 2005 – Participant: "Social Responsible Transformation" – Interdisciplinary residence, art projects, workshops and curatorship, Cittadellarte/Fondazione Pistoletto, Biella, Italy: Four-month residence together with 15 international artists and researchers: "Un gioco: la tua casa, il tuo segno, la tua scelta": installation of a playhouse with workshops on the notion of home/house, July 1 – October 31, 2015, University of Ideas, Fondazione Pistoletto, Biella, Italy
