= Public art =

Art in public space

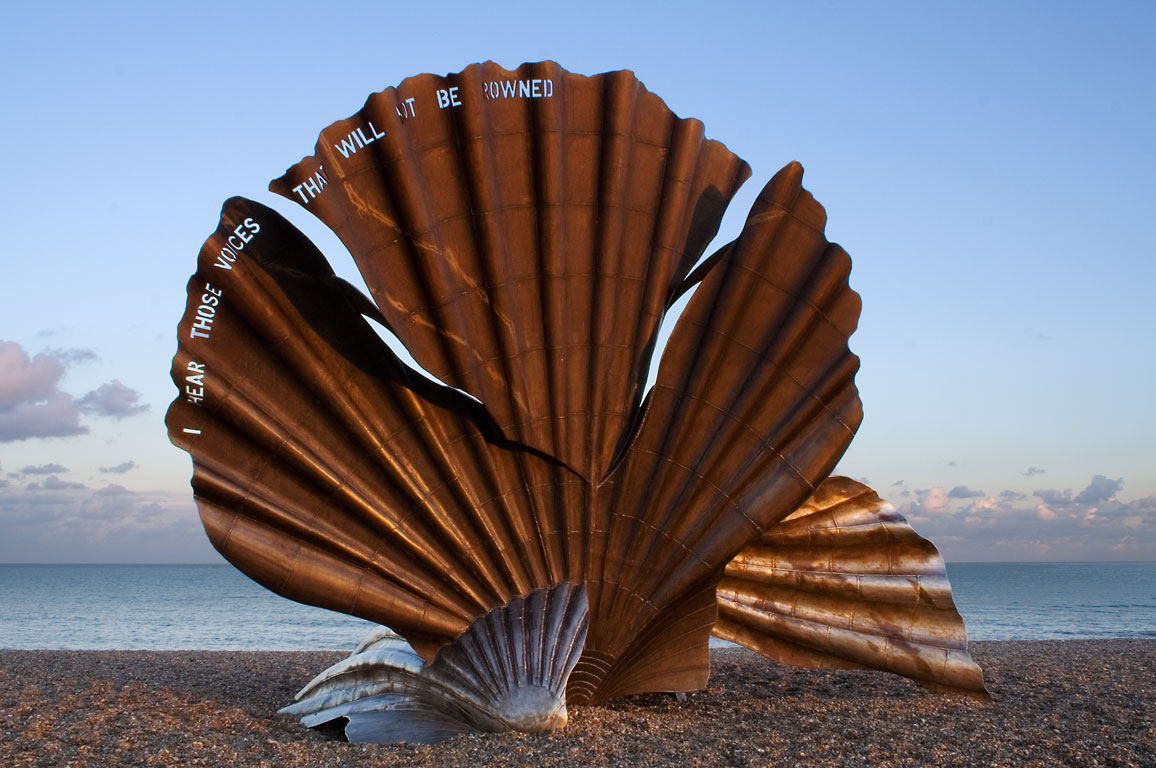
The Scallop, Aldeburgh, UK

Public art is art in any media whose form, function, and meaning are created for the general public through a public process. It is a specific art genre with its own professional and critical discourse. Public art is visually and physically accessible to the public; it is installed in public spaces in both outdoor and indoor settings. Public art often seeks to embody public or universal concepts rather than commercial, partisan, or personal concepts or interests. Notably, public art is also the direct or indirect product of a public process of creation, procurement and maintenance.

Independent art created or staged in or near the public realm (for example, graffiti, street art) lacks official or tangible public sanction has not been recognized as part of the public art genre, however the popularity of some street artists have led to this notion being reconsidered by many. Such unofficial artwork may exist on private or public property immediately adjacent to the public realm, or in natural settings but, however ubiquitous, it sometimes falls outside the definition of public art by its absence of public process or public sanction as "bona fide" public art.

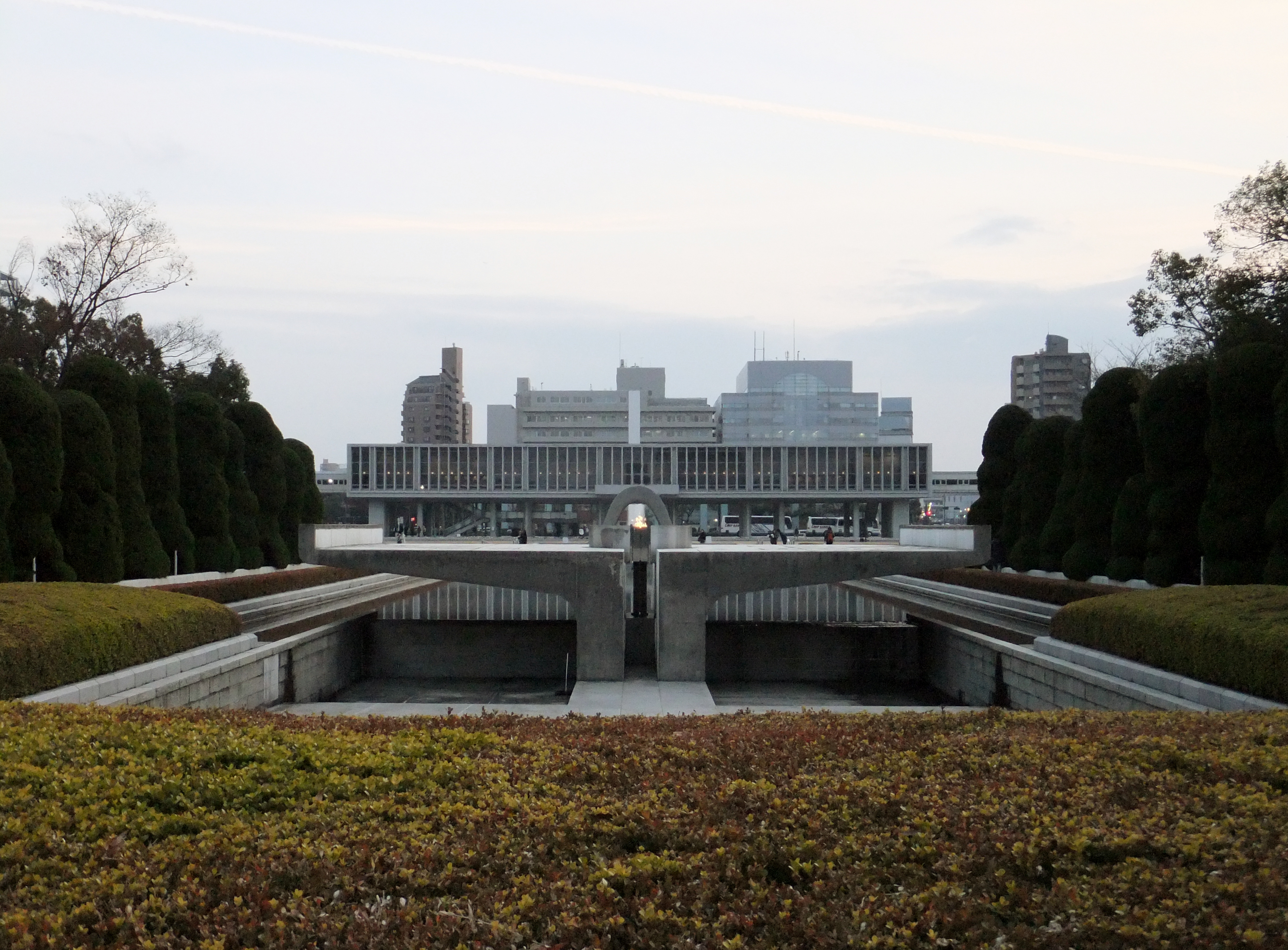
Peace Flame, Hiroshima, Japan

== Characteristics of public art ==
Common characteristics of public art are public accessibility, public realm placement, community involvement, public process (including public funding); these works can be permanent or temporary. According to the curator and art/architecture historian, Mary Jane Jacob, public art brings art closer to life.

=== Public accessibility: placement in public space/public realm ===
Public art is publicly accessible, both physically and visually. When public art is installed on privately owned property, general public access rights still exist.

Public art is characterized by site specificity, where the artwork is "created in response to the place and community in which it resides" and by the relationship between its content and the public. Cher Krause Knight states that "art's publicness rests in the quality and impact of its exchange with audiences ... at its most public, art extends opportunities for community engagement but cannot demand particular conclusion," it introduces social ideas but leaves room for the public to come to their own conclusions.

=== Public process, public funding ===
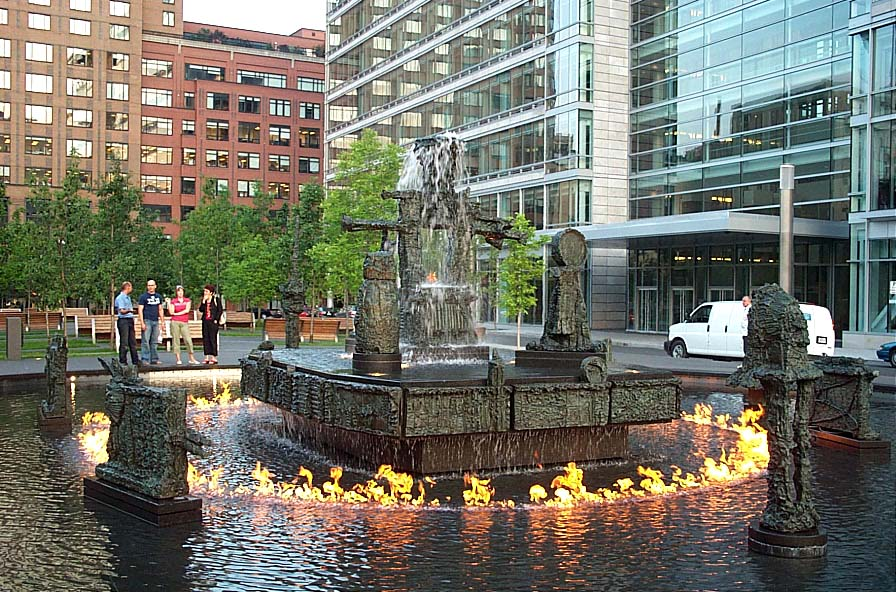
La Joute by Jean-Paul Riopelle, an outdoor kinetic sculpture installation with fire jets, fog machines, and a fountain in Montreal.

Public art is often characterized by community involvement and collaboration. Public artists and organizations often work in conjunction with architects, fabricators/construction workers, community residents and leaders, designers, funding organizations, and others.

Public art is often created in the context of formal "art in public places" programs that can include community arts education and art performance. Such programs may be financed by government entities through Percent for Art initiatives.

=== Longevity ===
Some public art is planned and designed for stability and permanence. Its placement in, or exposure to, the physical public realm requires both safe and durable materials. Public artworks are designed to withstand the elements (sun, wind, water) as well as human activity. In the United States, unlike gallery, studio, or museum artworks, which can be transferred or sold, public art is legally protected by the Visual Artists Rights Act of 1990 (VARA), which requires an official deaccession process for sale or removal.

== Forms of public art ==
The following forms of public art identify to what extent public art may be physically integrated with the immediate context or environment. These forms, which can overlap, employ different types of public art that suit a part

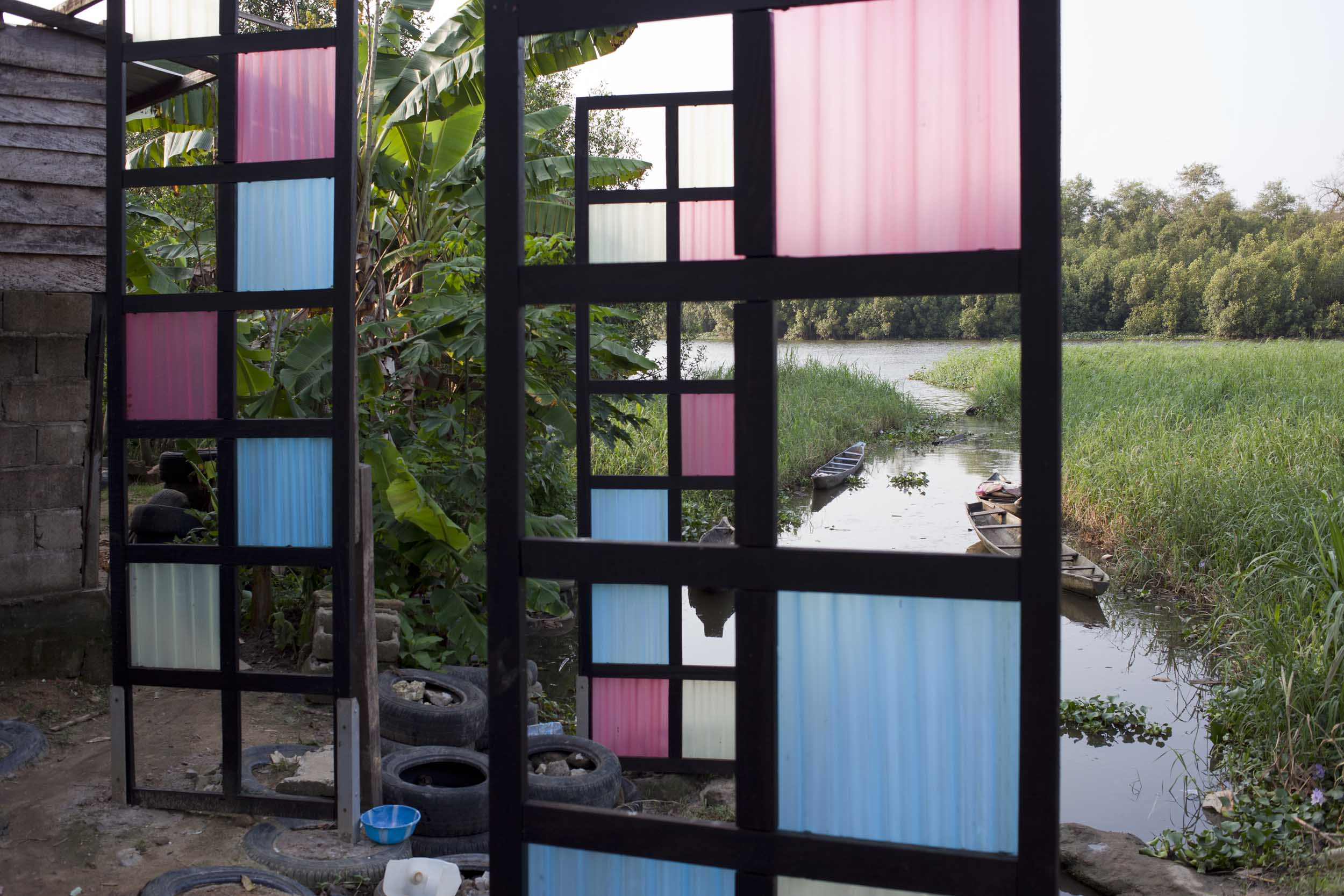
Salifou Lindou, Face à l'eau, Bonamouti-Deido, Douala, 2010. Commissioned by doual'art for the SUD Salon Urbain de Douala.

icular form of environment integration.

- stand alone: for example, sculptures, statues, structures
- integrated (into façades, pavements, or landscapes): for example, bas reliefs, Hill figure, Geoglyph, Petroglyph, mosaics, digital lighting
- applied (to a surface): for example, murals, building-mounted sculptures
- installation (where artwork and site are mutually embedded): for example, transit station art
- ephemeral (or non-permanent): performances, temporary installations: for example, a precarious rock balance or an instance of colored smoke.

== History of public art ==
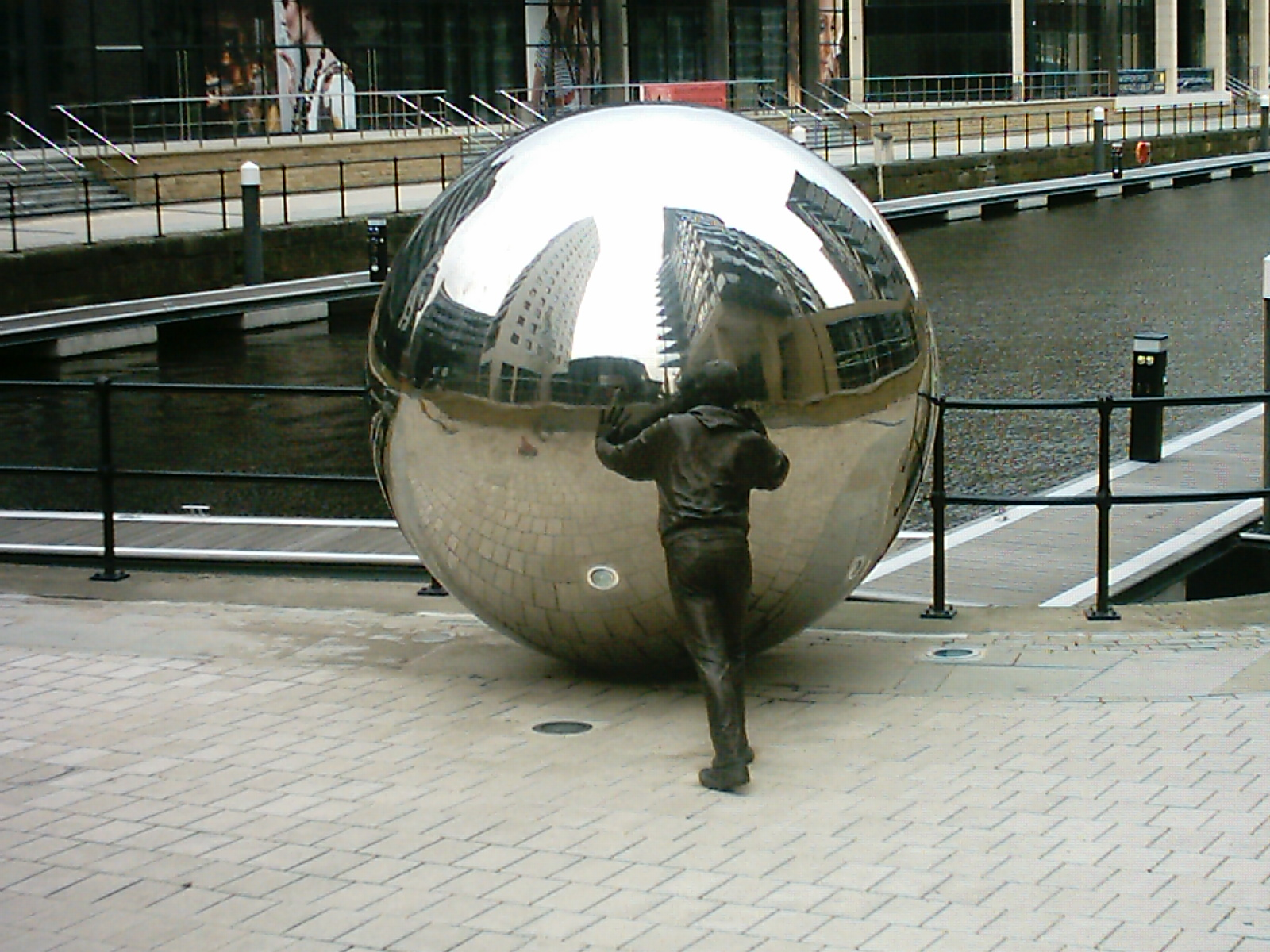
Public art on display at Clarence Dock, Leeds, UK

=== Environmental public art ===
Between the 1970s and the 1980s, gentrification and ecological issues surfaced in public art practice both as a commission motive and as a critical focus by artists. The individual, Romantic retreat element implied in the conceptual structure of land art, and its will to reconnect the urban environment with nature, is turned into a political claim in projects such as Wheatfield – A Confrontation (1982) by American artist Agnes Denes, as well as in Joseph Beuys' 7000 Oaks (1982). Both projects focus on the increase of ecological awareness through a green urban design process, bringing Denes to plant a two-acre field of wheat in downtown Manhattan and Beuys to plant 7000 oaks coupled with basalt blocks in Kassel, Germany, in a guerrilla or community garden fashion. In recent years, programs of green urban regeneration aiming at converting abandoned lots into green areas regularly include public art programs. This is the case for High Line Art, 2009, a commission program for the High Line, derived from the conversion of a portion of railroad in New York City; and of Gleisdreieck, 2012, an urban park derived from the partial conversion of a railway station in Berlin which hosts, since 2012, an open-air contemporary art exhibition.

=== Interactive public art ===
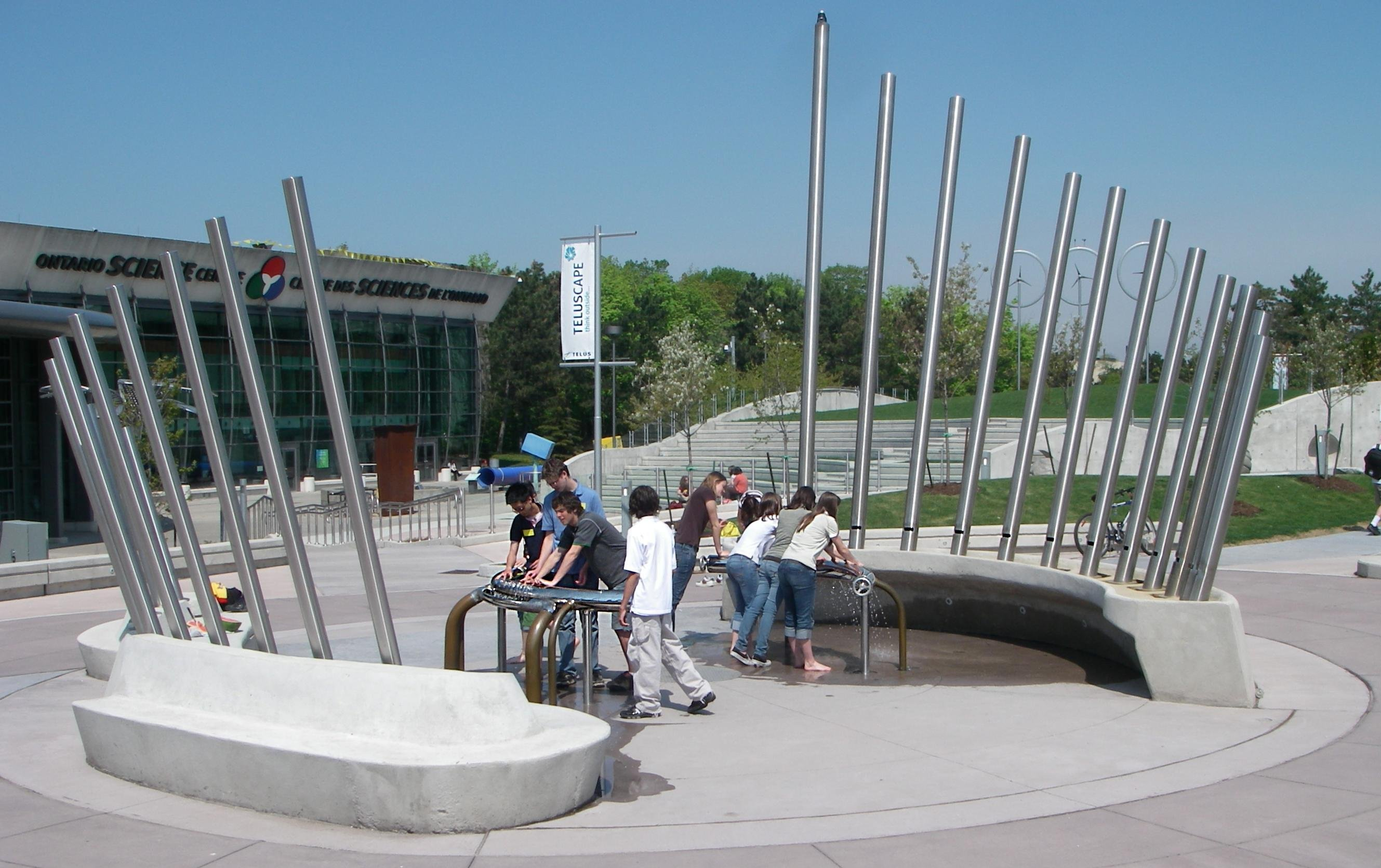
Public sculpture that is also a musical instrument (hydraulophone) by Steve Mann, which the public can play.

Some public art is designed to encourage direct hands-on interaction. Examples include public art that contains interactive musical, light, video, or water components. For example, the architectural centerpiece in front of the Ontario Science Centre is a fountain and musical instrument (a hydraulophone) by Steve Mann, where people can produce sounds by blocking water jets to force water through sound-producing mechanisms.

An early and unusual interactive public artwork was Jim Pallas' 1980 Century of Light in Detroit, Michigan, a large outdoor mandala of lights that reacted in complex ways to sounds and movements detected by radar. It was mistakenly destroyed 25 years later.

Another example is Rebecca Hackemann's two works: The Public Utteraton Machines (2015), which record people's opinions of other public art in New York—such as Jeff Koons' Split Rocker—and display responses online, and The Urban Field Glass Project / Visionary Sightseeing Binoculars, which are public viewing devices for speculative or altered cityscapes.

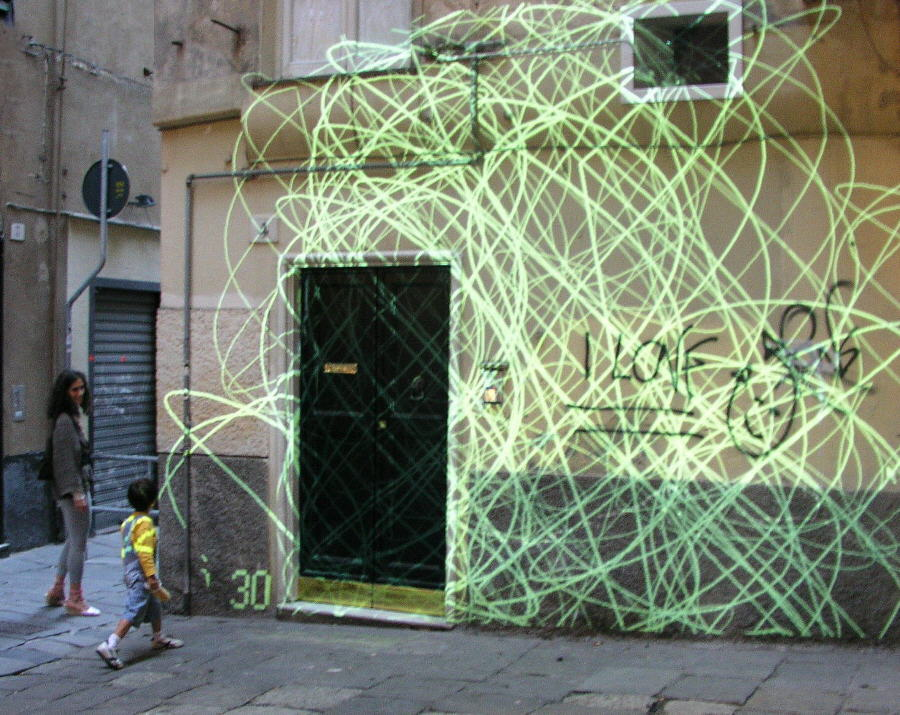
An outdoor interactive installation by Maurizio Bolognini (Genoa, 2005), which everybody could modify by using a mobile phone.

=== New genre public art ===
In the 1990s, some artists called for artistic social intervention in public space. These efforts employed the term "new genre public art" in addition to the terms "contextual art", "relational art", "participatory art", "dialog art", "community-based art", and "activist art". "New genre public art" is defined by Suzanne Lacy as "socially engaged, interactive art for diverse audiences with connections to identity politics and social activism". Mel Chin's Fundred Dollar Bill Project is an example of an interactive, social activist public art project. Rather than metaphorically reflecting social issues, new genre public art strove to explicitly empower marginalized groups while maintaining aesthetic appeal. An example was curator Mary Jane Jacob's 1993 public art show "Culture in Action" that investigated social systems though engagement with audiences that typically did not visit traditional art museums.

In the 21st Century, public art has often been a significant component of public realm projects in UK cities and towns, often via engagement with local residents, where artists will work with the community in developing an idea or sourcing content to be featured in the artwork. Examples would include Adrian Riley's 'Come Follow Me' in Minster in Lincolnshire where a 35m long text artwork in the public square outside the town's Minster includes local residents own stories alongside official civic history and the town's origin myth.

=== Curated public art ===
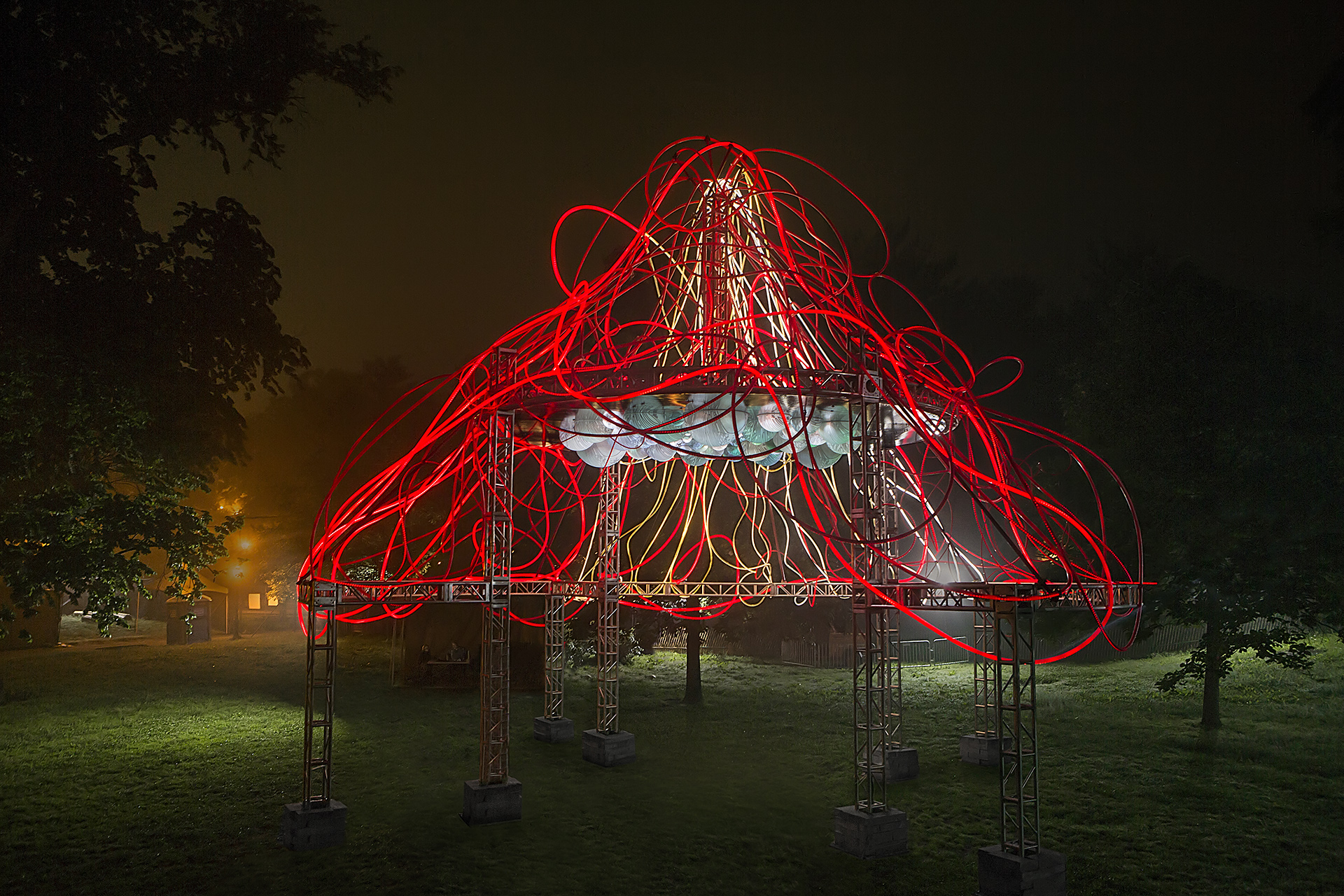
Public light sculpture installation by Grimanesa Amorós, Prospect Park, Brooklyn, 2018. Commissioned by BRIC.

The term "curated public art" is used to define the way of producing public art that significantly takes into account the context, the process, and the different actors involved. It defines itself slightly differently from the top-down approaches of direct commissioning.

If it mainly designates the fact that a curator conducts and supervises the realization of a public artwork for a third party, it can also mean that the artwork is produced by a community or public who commissions a work in collaboration with a curator-mediator.

For the second one, can refer to Les Nouveaux Commanditaires launched by Fondation de France with François Hers in 1990 with the idea that a project can respond to a community's wish. The New York High Line from 2009 is a good example, although less art is involved. The doual'art project in Douala (Cameroon, 1991) is based on a commissioning system that brings together the community, the artist, and the commissioning institution for the realization of the project.

=== Memorial public art ===
Memorials for individuals, groups of people, or events are sometimes represented through public art. Examples are Maya Lin's Vietnam War Memorial in Washington DC, Tim Tate's AIDS Monument in New Orleans, and Kenzō Tange's Cenotaph for the A-bomb Victims in Hiroshima Peace Memorial Park in Japan.

== Controversies ==
Public art is sometimes controversial. The following public art controversies have been notable:

- Detroit's Heidelberg Project was controversial for several decades since its inception in 1986 due to its garish appearance.
- Richard Serra's minimalist piece Tilted Arc was removed from Foley Square in New York City in 1989 after office workers complained the piece disrupted their work routine. A public court hearing ruled against the continued display of the work.
- Victor Pasmore's Apollo Pavilion in the English New Town of Peterlee has been a focus for local politicians and other groups complaining about the governance of the town and allocation of resources. Artists and cultural leaders mounted a campaign to rehabilitate the reputation of the work with the Baltic Centre for Contemporary Art commissioning artists Jane and Louise Wilson to make a video installation about the piece in 2003.
- Sam Durant's Scaffold (2017), installed in the Walker Art Center's garden, represented the gallows used in seven government hangings. Native American groups found the work offensive, as 38 Dakota people had been hung at Mankato, Minnesota. The artist agreed to dismantle and permit the tribal elders to burn and bury the piece.
- Maurice Agis' Dreamspace V, a huge inflatable maze erected in Chester-le-Street, County Durham, killed two women and seriously injured a three-year-old girl in 2006 when a strong wind broke its moorings and carried it 30 ft (9.1 m) into the air, with thirty people trapped inside.
- Ron Robertson-Swann's Vault, an abstract yellow polygonal structure erected in Melbourne City Square was considered so visually offensive that it was moved several times and referred by much of the public by the racist colour metaphor Yellow Peril.
- There have been numerous controversies regarding monuments in the United States, many of which have to do with public monuments dedicated to soldiers and leaders of the Confederate States of America following the American Civil War.

== Online documentation ==
Online databases of local and regional public art emerged in the 1990s and 2000s in tandem with the development of web-based data. Online public art databases can be general or selective (limited to sculptures or murals), and they can be governmental, quasi-governmental, or independent. Some online databases, such as the Smithsonian American Art Museum's Archives of American Art. It currently holds over six thousand works in its database.

Dozens of non-government organizations and educational institutions maintain online public art databases of public artworks covering numerous areas, including the National Endowment for the Arts, WESTAF, Public Art Fund, Creative Time, and others. Public Art Online, maintains a database of public art works, essays and case studies, with a focus on the UK. The Institute for Public Art, based in the UK, maintains information about public art on six continents.

The WikiProject Public art project began in 2009 and strove to document public art around the globe. While this project received initial attention from the academic community, it mainly relied on temporary student contributions. Its status is currently unknown.

== See also ==
- ART/MEDIA
- Association for Public Art
- Containerart
- Canary Wharf Art Trail, London
- Environmental sculpture
- List of sculptors
- Lock On (street art)
- Murals
- Plop art
- Sculpture trail
- Site-specific art
- Statue
- Street installation
- Graffiti
- Tape Art
- Street Art
- Trompe-l'œil

== Gallery ==
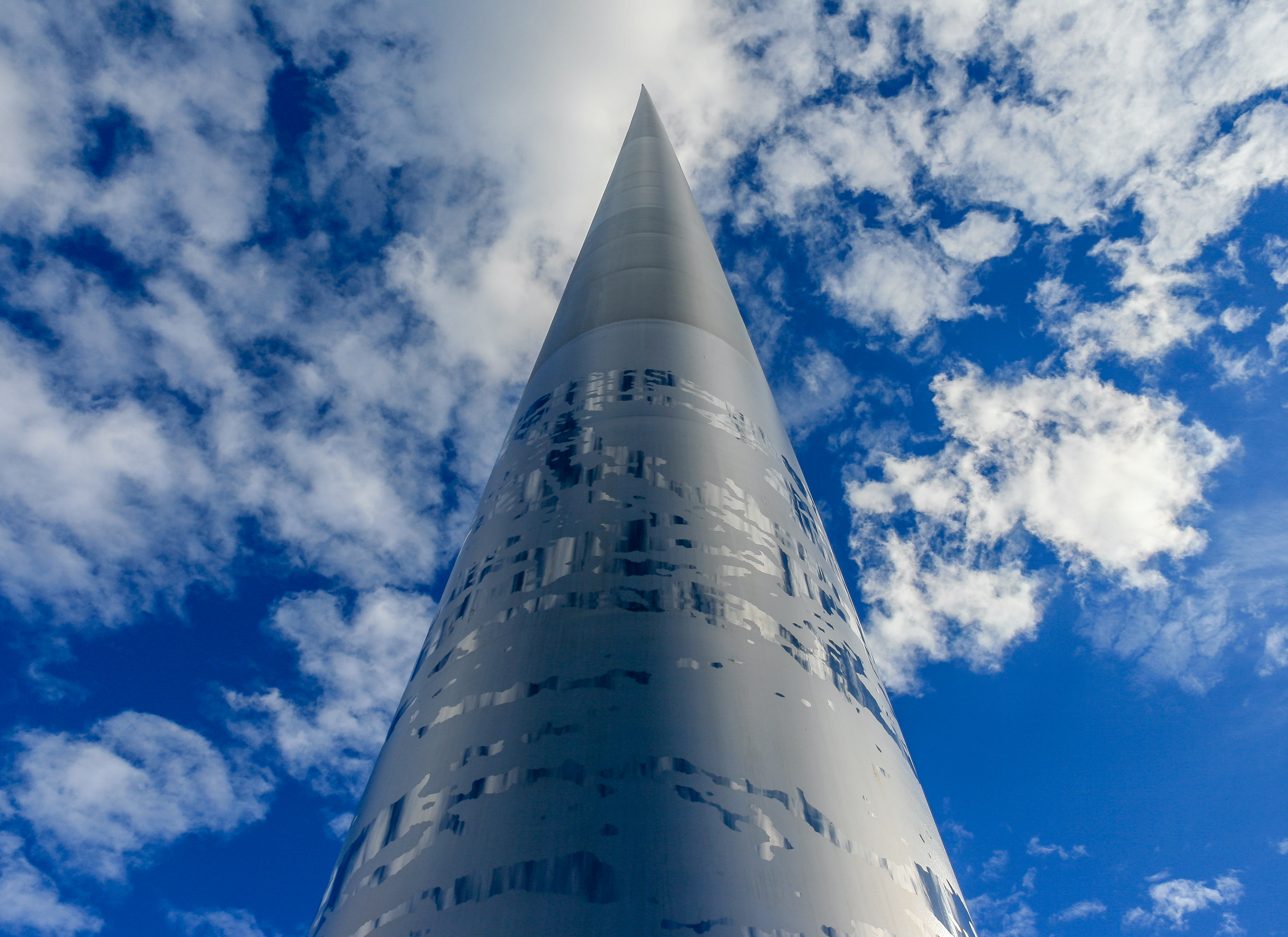
Spire of Dublin

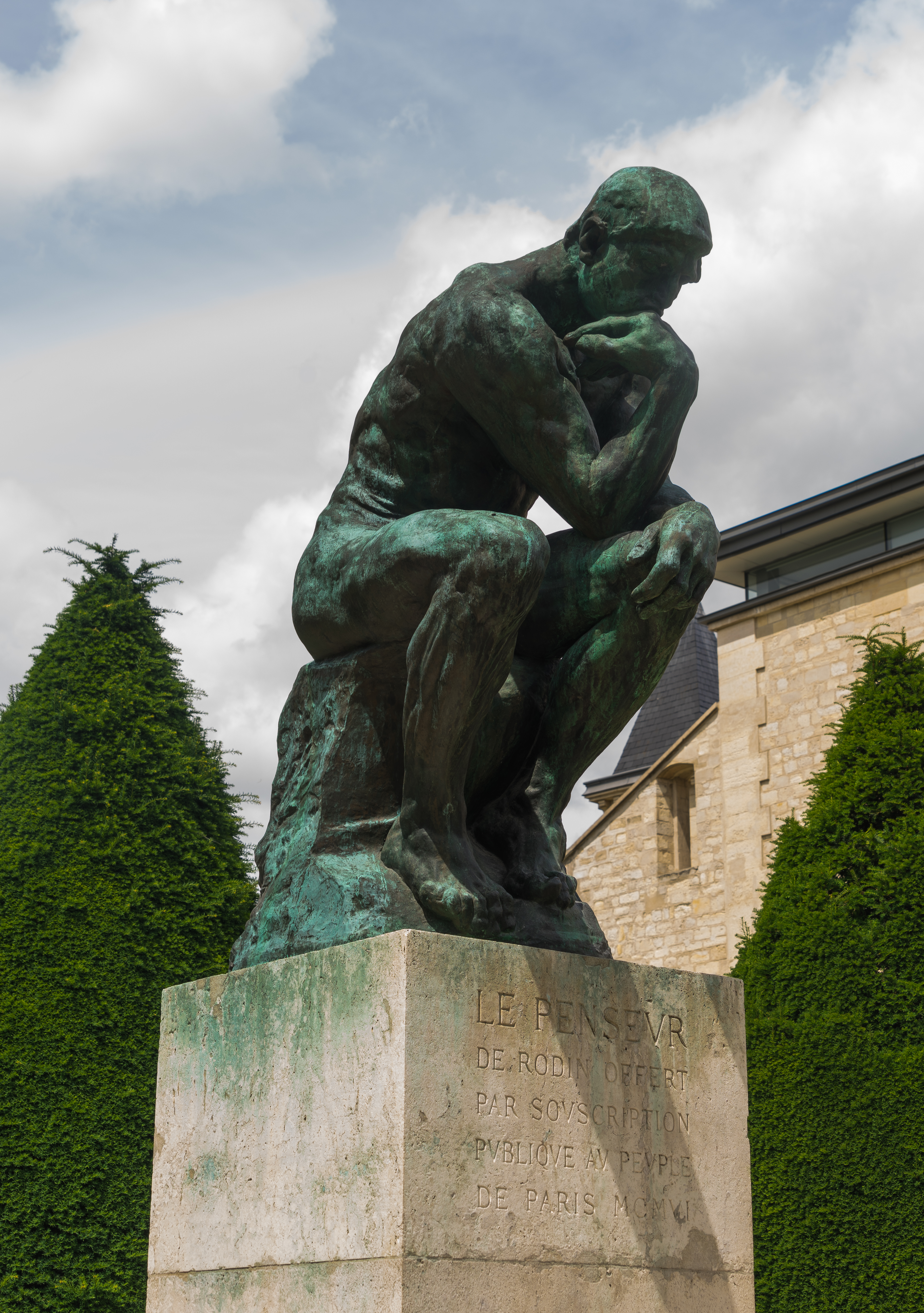
The Thinker

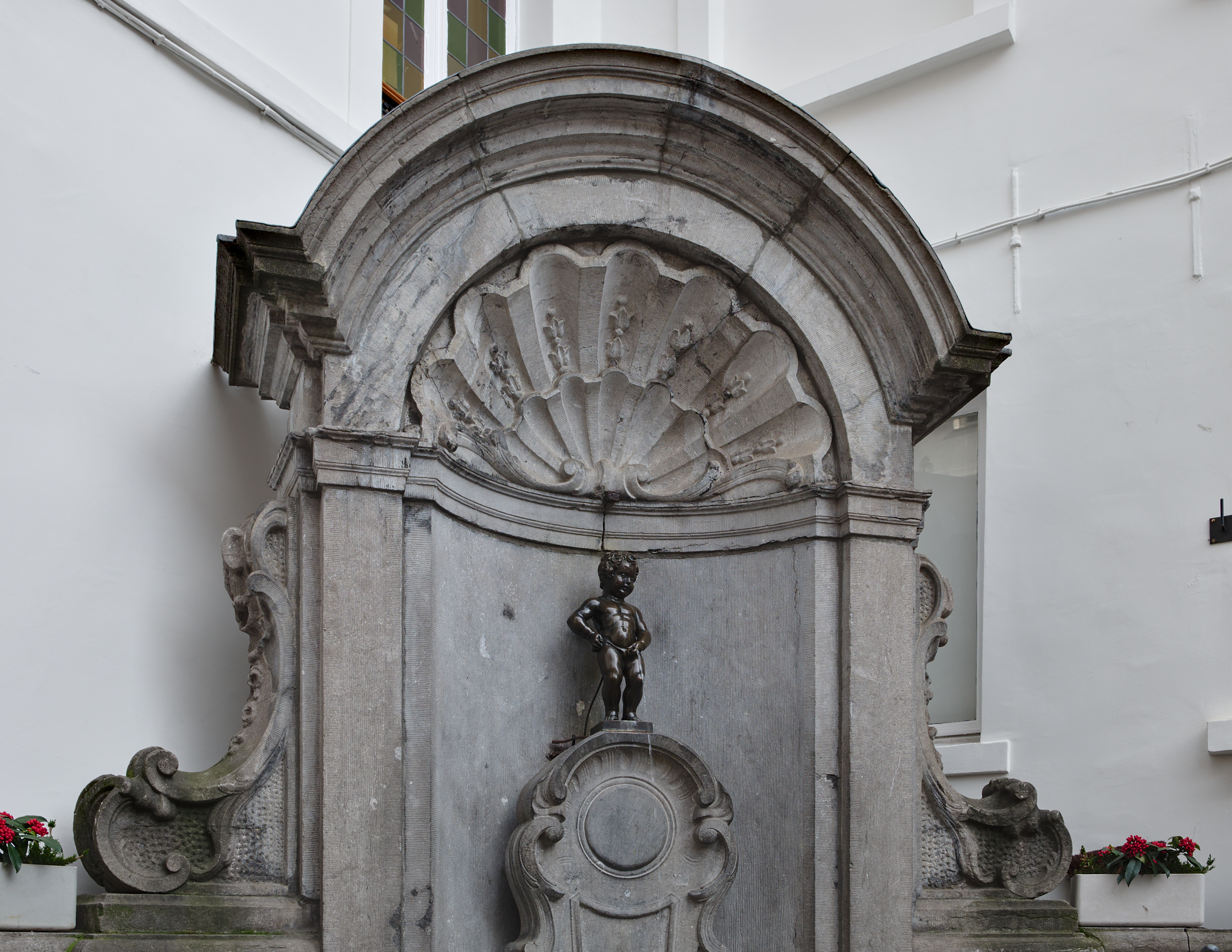
Manneken Pis

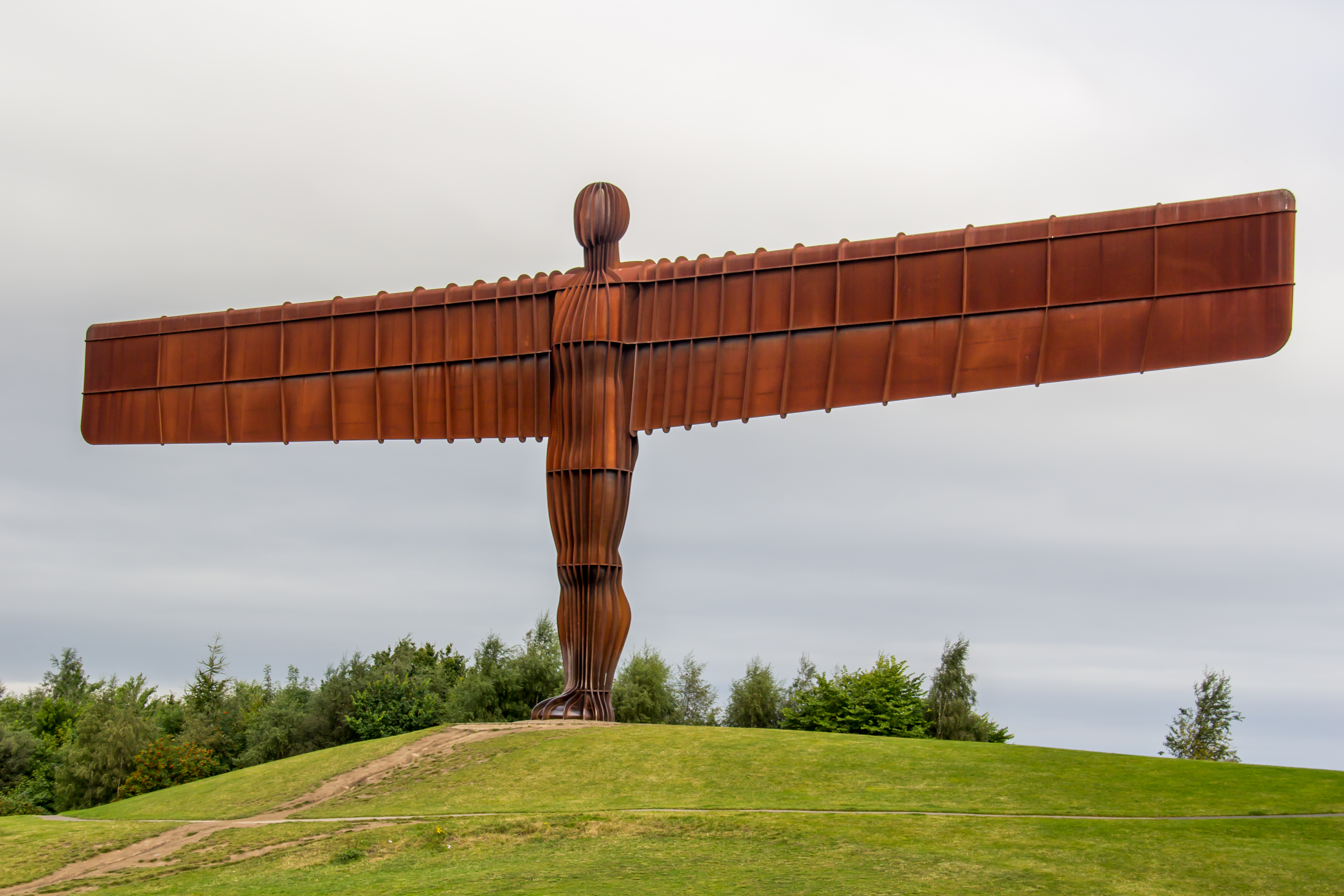
Angel of the North

== Bibliography ==
- Cole, Ina, From the Sculptor's Studio: Conversations with Twenty Seminal Artists (London: Laurence King Publishing Ltd, 2021) ISBN 9781913947590 OCLC 1420954826.
- Cartiere, Cameron, and Martin Zebracki, eds. The Everyday Practice of Public Art: Art, Space, and Social Inclusion. Routledge, 2016.
- Zebracki, Martin. Public Artopia: Art in Public Space in Question. Amsterdam University Press, 2012.
- Chris van Uffelen: 500 x Art in Public: Masterpieces from the Ancient World to the Present. Braun Publishing, 1. Auflage, 2011, 309 S., in Engl. [Mit Bild, Kurzbiografie und kurzer Beschreibung werden 500 Künstler mit je einem Kunstwerk im öffentlichen Raum vorgestellt. Alle Kontinente (außer der Antarktis) und alle Kunststile sind vertreten.]
- Savage, Kirk. Monument Wars: Washington, DC, the National Mall, and the Transformation of the Memorial Landscape. University of California Press, 2009.
- Powers, John. Temporary Art and Public Place: Comparing Berlin with Los Angeles. European University Studies, Peter Lang Publishers, 2009.
- Durante, Dianne. Outdoor Monuments of Manhattan: A Historical Guide. New York University Press, 2007.
- Ronald Kunze: Stadt, Umbau, Kunst: Sofas und Badewannen aus Beton in: STADTundRAUM, H., S. 62–65, 2/2006.
- Goldstein, Barbara, ed. Public Art by the Book, 2005.
- Federica Martini, Public Art in Mobile A2K Methodology guide, 2002.
- Florian Matzner (ed.): Public Art. Kunst im öffentlichen Raum, Ostfildern 2001
- Finkelpearl, Tom, ed. Dialogues in Public Art. MIT Press, 2000.
- Lacy, Susanne, ed. Mapping the Terrain: New Genre Public Art. Bay Press, 1995.
- Deutsche, Rosalyn. Evictions: Art and Spatial Politics. MIT Press, 1998.
- Burgin, Victor. In/Different Spaces: Place and Memory in Visual Culture. University of California Press, 1996.
- Miles, Malcolm. Art, Space and the City: Public Art and Urban Futures, 1997.
- Academy Group Ltd. Public Art, Art & Design. London, 1996
- Doss, Erika Lee. Spirit Poles and Flying Pigs: Public Art and Cultural Democracy in American Communities. Smithsonian Books, 1995.
- Senie, Harriet, and Sally Webster, eds. Critical Issues in Public Art: Content, Context, and Controversy. HarperCollins, 1992.
- Crimp, Douglas. On the Museum's Ruins. MIT Press, 1993.
- Miles, Malcolm, et al. Art For Public Places: Critical Essays, 1989.
- Volker Plagemann (ed.). Kunst im öffentlichen Raum. Anstöße der 80er Jahre, Köln, 1989
- Love, Suzanne, and Kim Dammers. The Lansing Area Arts Attitude Survey. Michigan State University Center for Urban Affairs, Lansing, 1978
- Herlyn, Sunke, Manske, Hans-Joachim, and Weisser, Michael (eds.). Kunst im Stadtbild - Von Kunst am Bau zu Kunst im öffentlichen Raum, (catalog for exhibition of the same name, at University of Bremen), Bremen, 1976
