= François Hers =

Belgian photographer and artist

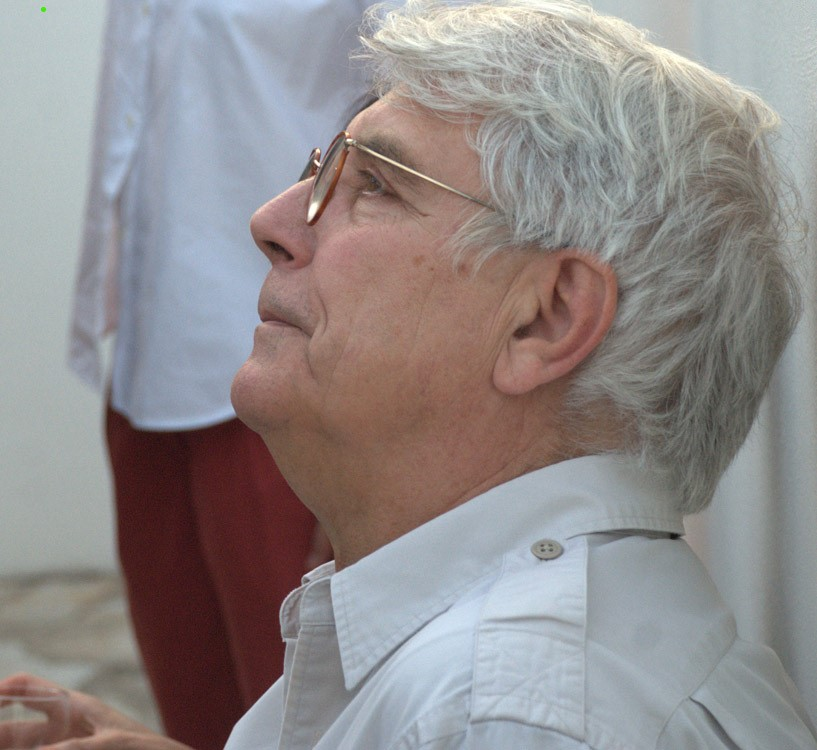
- François Hers in 2014.
- Born: 1943 (age 82–83); Brussels
- Occupations: Artist, writer
- Movement: Conceptual art, Photography
- Awards: Legion of Honour, Ordre des Arts et des Lettres, Nadar prize, UNESCO Joan Miro Medal

François Hers (born in 1943 in Uccle, Brussels) is a Belgian photographer and artist. He has been living and working in France since 1968.

== Biography ==
The career and work of this artist from the conceptual movement reflect the education he received. His mother (Nelly Stutz-Anagnostopoulos 1921–1987) taught him, through stories about the doings of his family during the Greek War of Independence and the Second Hellenic Republic, that it is possible to influence history. His father (Joseph Hers, 1884–1965), who spent over thirty-three years in China before founding a family, inspired him to search for the genuine motors of history behind those commonly accepted. Their house, by the architect Henry van de Velde, in which he lived until age 21, was a privileged meeting place for personalities who came to inform his father on political, religious, diplomatic, economic issues in Asia, the Soviet Union and Africa, in the framework of his activities to promote and favour exchanges with these regions of the globe, founded on first-hand information.

As for his artistic education, François Hers was self-taught, learning from books and magazines, manifestos, and other seminal texts on the history of art in Europe ranging from 1900 to 1940. These exhaustive publications left by Henry van de Velde in their house built in 1927, the "Nouvelle Maison," which has been since classified as a historic monument.

After a brief passage in architecture, questioning himself about what could be his contribution to the history of modern art he admired so much, François Hers understood that it was not through traditional means and career path that he would concretize this ambition that would guide his entire body of work.

In 1963, according to his own words, François Hers decided to break out the museum walls that blocked the prospects Dada and Marcel Duchamps had opened up, and decided to create a form of relationsship between society, its artists and their works that would be as contemporary as the works themselves. In his opinion, whatever the formal progress suggested by the avant-garde, such relationships were still established by default or remainedd governed by modalities conceived during the Renaissance.

During the sixties and the seventies, François Hers used photography as a tool to create Performances and question the possible patterns of the relationships artists may develop with society, as well as the ones between society members themselves and also the most intimate forms of expressions of each individual.

In 1972, while living in Paris, he took part in creating an author-photographer's cooperative named Viva agency. There, he was the instigator of a collective reportage called Families in France, described as historic for its powerful portrayal of the upheavals in French society it displayed.

To enrish his work with an experience of the world, his reporter status gave him the means to travel and to immerse himself into situations that would not have been open to him as an artist. It also allowed him to experiment the conditions of a demand-driven economy, as opposed to the supply-driven economy that governs exchanges in art. While, in his view, this mode of anonymous exchange was historically necessary, now that artists, like everyone else, have gained autonomy and freedom, they cannot remain alone in responding to the creative needs of their society in a political economy of art that, moreover, in no way meets the requirements of a democracy.

He exhibited in various museums and art centres. In 1980, at the Paris Biennale at the MMVP, he presented a series that revolutionized the art of the nude. In 1982, he published in the daily newspaper Libération a picture per day during five weeks, along with a commentary, based on his relationship with the city in which he lives in : Paris. In 1979, he met Sophie Ristelhueber. They married in 1996. In 1981, he exhibited with her Intérieurs at the Centre Pompidou, with a book well received beyond the world of art finding significant resonance in the social sciences.

In 1983, François Hers had his book of photographs Récit published by Lebeer-Hossmann in Brussels, by Herscher in Paris and Thames & Hudson in London. Its form and content extensively renewed the genre. With a text resulting from dialogues with Jean-François Chevrier and graphic design by Roman Cieslewicz, he presented his thrive to free the modern artist from a situation where he is doomed to remain the lonely hero of his own story. A scenario in which the work itself is locked in the status of object, part of a property or as a traded good, without being able to concretize the ambitions of a generation of artists: change the world and place art within life. A quest that will be qualified as “wild.”

In 1986, he took part in the exhibition Chambres d’Amis (Guest Rooms) in Ghent, Belgium, for which the organizer Jan Hoet was inspired by his book Interieurs, and after working with a major contemporary art gallery, Gewad, directed by Joost Declerq, François Hers became firmly convinced that it was outside the museum and the market that he would find the means and collaborations that would help him achieve his goal.

At the same time, in 1983, in response to a request made by Bernard Latarjet on behalf of the DATAR, (the French Inter-ministerial Delegation for Territorial and Regional Attractiveness), François Hers proposed the creation of a photographic mission, for which he designed the protocol and which he directed until 1989. He convinced this public administration to recognize the cultural responsibilities inherent to its technical activity, which was transforming the landscape in France, and to assume them by calling on artists to imagine new forms of relationship with contemporary space. This DATAR photographic mission would go down in the history of photography and the representation of space.

In 1990, when questioned by the Fondation de France, which was looking for models of action that would better take into account the real cultural needs of our society, he proposed to Bernard Latarjet, who had taken over as director, a new mode of action based on an appeal to art emanating from society itself. This action was governed by a protocol that the Foundation implemented in 1991 in conjunction with a multifaceted program to support research in art history and humanities.

This implementation of the Protocol of the New Patrons will be carried out with the help of a network of personalities from the world of contemporary art, whom François Hers will name mediators. They will be asked to use their knowledge and skills to forge links, not only between existing works and an audience, but also between people working together to create a work: a patron, an artist, and beyond that, all those who will be involved.

Once the implementation of this Protocol was well established, he suggested to open this call for research in the humanities, social sciences, and natural sciences: a culture being for a society both the set of relationships to the world that it creates and the understanding of what constitutes the world that it develops. In the 1990s, to help artists take a stand on social issues or explore new areas for creation, it will support, for example, the intervention of several African writers on the genocide in Rwanda to break the silence and find the words; photographer Gilles Peress's book and exhibition in Washington on the siege of Sarajevo, during the debate preceding the American intervention; a film on our perception of Africa by filmmaker Raymond Depardon, or on pain by Stephen Dwoskin; and visual artist Pierre Huyges's experimentation with the use of a television set and program.

In 2001, François Hers published his first manifesto "Le Protocole" with the Presses du Réel in Dijon. The text was then translated into the languages of the many people involved in the process launched. In line with this book, the same editor published in 2012 L'Art sans le capitalisme, with Xavier Douroux.

Two works in particular will enrich the critical mass of the New Sponsors' action. In 2013, under the aegis of a committee chaired by Bruno Latour, Faire art comme on fait société (Making Art as We Make Society) presented a collection of 47 contributions from a wide range of disciplines[14]. This initiative puts the action into perspective, drawing on both studies of commissions or case studies throughout history as well as a general study of current practices. In 2017, under the direction of Estelle Zhong and Xavier Douroux, another work, published in English, Reclaiming Art - Reshaping Democracy, similarly focuses on Anglo-Saxon perspectives. This critical mass continues to be enriched by several commissioned evaluations carried out by researchers, such as that by sociologist Emmanuel Négrier, “Une politique culturelle privée en France” (A Private Cultural Policy in France), or that provided by philosopher Vinciane Despret on what several commissions on death reveal, in her book “Les morts à l'œuvre” (The Dead at Work).

While continuing to serve as cultural advisor to the Fondation de France, François Hers pursued other activities in parallel. In 1994, amid controversy with the Ministry of Culture over the legitimacy of private foundations’s role in culture, he oversaw the establishment of the Hartung-Bergman Artist Foundation [15], which has since become a benchmark. He turned it into a laboratory where managing and studying methods, another essential aspect of contemporary culture, our artistic heritage, are explored and invented[16]. In 2014, he considered that he could not give this foundation any greater form and that its management should henceforth be taken over by a historian, as art history is at the heart of the raison d'être of such a foundation. He therefore handed over the management to a young historian, Thomas Schlesser, who would drive the remarkable development of the services offered by this foundation. (FR).

While piloting the development of exceptional artistic patrimony of archives in a 17th-century castle, François Hers established several other artists' foundations. For instance, the Olivier Messiaen Foundation, which has become, after renovations on the property where he composed most of his works, in 2016, a privileged residency for other composers and musicians. He offered the artistic direction to Bruno Messina (EN).

Elsewhere, in a botanical and animal park, also under the aegis of the Fondation de France, he proposed to call on the Architects Patrick Bouchain (FR) and Loïc Julienne, with their teams of landscapers and Graphic designers, to bring shape to the cultural dimensions of this place. He also called on researchers to conceive responses that could be applied to one of the principle questions posed by this place and to which our society is hereby confronted: how may one move from a predatory to a diplomatic relationship with the living beings and the earth?

In parallel, by organizing Seminars and supporting Publications with the Fondation de France, many works now present, from antiquity till the present day, a history of art that is not only about form, but also about the political conditions and contexts which brought artists to react and which determined the status society granted to their works.

In 2016, François Hers published, in French and English, Lettre à un ami au sujet des Nouveaux commanditaires to accompany the national and international development of the initiative within the Fondation de France supported by Catia Riccaboni et Dominque Lemaistre, which has since been joined by various public and private institutions in France and Europe.

In 2019, with the implementation of the New Patrons Protocol in France and in various European countries, as well as in other contexts around the world, having fully demonstrated its relevance and feasibility, the Fondation de France chose to hand over the reins so that others could ensure its wider development. It had fulfilled the mission assigned by the French government at its creation to help develop patronage: to identify social issues in all fields that had received little or no response, to identify people and methods of action capable of responding to them, and, if necessary, to take the risks of innovation to make them fully operational before passing them on. François Hers then proposed that, like their colleagues in Europe, mediators in France should join forces within an association that could steer this new development. In 2020, Amanda Crabtree, with the help of Mari Linmann and Chantal de Singly, created the Société des Nouveaux commanditaires, while an international association under European law was also created in Brussels. For his part, by investing himself once again in a more intimate work, he continued his reflection and writing on the ins and outs of this Protocol while dialoguing with the people and institutions that could contribute to its implementation.

== The Protocol of New Patrons ==
In his books Lettre à un ami (Letter to a Friend) and Opérations (Operations), François Hers believes that the conditions are right for a new chapter in the history of art to begin. That of democratic art following the one in which artists, along with philosophers and scientists, played a major role in the realization of the modern epic that began in the Renaissance and ended in the middle of the last century. He then suggested that a call for creation and research could become the driving force behind the implementation of a new form of democracy. A form based on the effective and active participation of all social actors in achieving this cultural ambition, which is still very young in historical terms: building a society with individuals while respecting their rights, beliefs, and interests. In other words, a participatory democracy that complements the exercise of representative democracy, because a deepening political crisis reveals that we can no longer expect elected officials alone, without the involvement of society itself, to be able to master the complexity of such a political project and the tensions inherent in it. Nor can they, without help, respond on the field to all the legitimate expectations that a democracy can give rise to. These include being taken into consideration, being able to engage in solidarity-based reflection and express an opinion that is not reduced to a mere view or vote, and being able to decide to act accordingly.

In order to do so, this Protocol is governed by a new cultural actor: a mediator-producer who is independent of the parties and qualified in the arts and sciences, as he or she may subsequently be in other fields that can contribute to the development of populations and territories.

To take action, this Protocol considers the roles and responsibilities of all social actors without distinction. It invites anyone who wishes to do so to speak to this mediator, who is there to listen to them and has informed them about the device, about any problem or issue that concerns them in any area of their life or work; to assess its relevance and feasibility with members of their community so that they can decide together to take public responsibility for a commission that may involve all disciplines of creation and research.

The mediator then makes an informed decision and assigns the commission to an artist or researcher he or she deems appropriate, submitting his or her choice to the sponsors for approval.

By entrusting mediators with the means to act, the elected officials and patrons who possess them support the development of a new political economy of creation and research, driven by the civic initiative of individuals acting on their own behalf for the common good.

Finally, as a producer, the mediator brings together and ensures the proper management of resources and the successful completion of a project that the sponsors are responsible for its integration into the community for which it is intended.

== Bibliography ==
- Intérieurs, with Sophie Ristelhueber, Archives d'Architecture Moderne, 1981, ISBN 2-87143-022-5
- Récit, Lebeer-Hossmann and Herscher, 1983, ISBN 978-2-7335-0047-7
- A Tale, Thames & Hudson, 1983, ISBN 0-500-54091-8
- Paysages Photographies, La Mission Photographique de la Datar, Travaux en cours, Hazan, 1985, ISBN 2-85025-099-6
- Paysages Photographies, En France des années quatre-vingt, Hazan, 1989, ISBN 2-85025-210-7
- Le Protocole, Les Presses du Réel, 2002, ISBN 978-2-8406-6075-0
- L'Art sans le capitalisme, Les presses du réel, 2012, ISBN 978-2-8406-6506-9
- Art Without Capitalism, Les presses du réel, 2013, ISBN 978-2-84066-591-5
- Faire Art comme on fait société, Les presses du réel, 2013, ISBN 978-2-84066-623-3
- Reclaiming Art – Reshaping Democracy, Les presses du réel, 2017
- Letter to a Friend About the New Patrons, Les presses du réel, ISBN 978-2-84066-905-0
- Lettre à un ami au sujet des Nouveaux commanditaires, Les presses du réel, ISBN 978-2-84066-904-3

== Honours ==
- 1983: Nadar Prize
- 1999: Joan Miro UNESCO Medal
- 2009: Chevalier des Arts et Lettres
- 2016: Chevalier de la Légion d'Honneur
