= Matali Crasset =

French industrial designer

- Crasset in 2026
- Born: Nathalie Crasset; July 28, 1965 (age 61); Chalons-en-Champagne
- Education: École nationale supérieure de création industrielle
- Known for: industrial designer artist architectural designer
- Website: matalicrasset.com

Matali Crasset, born on July 28, 1965, in Châlons-en-Champagne, is a French Industrial designer.

== Biography ==
Matali Crasset was born on July 28, 1965, in Chalons-en-Champagne into a family of farmers. She spent her childhood in the small village of Normée. In 1988, she decided to continue her studies in Paris at the ENSCI (Ecole Nationale Supérieure de Création Industrielle) and obtained her diploma as an industrial designer in 1991. She joined Denis Santachiara's studio in Milan in 1992 for a year, before joining Philippe Starck's studio in Paris in 1993, where she was appointed head of the Thomson Multimedia project, then Tim Thom, Thomson's design center. This collaboration lasted four years during which Matali Crasset developed under the direction of Philippe Starck "everyday objects at the service of people". Matali Crasset has defined Philippe Starck as a complex personality in whom she admires the ability to free himself from constraints. Nevertheless, 1998 saw her creating her own company with her husband Francis Fichot, to "protect herself from Starck".

Matali Crasset lives and works in Paris. She is the mother of two children, Popline and Arto.

In 2011 and 2016, she is a guest of honour at the Festival international du livre d'art et du film.

She was one of the artists selected by Brigitte Macron in 2017 for the redevelopment and decoration of the Elysée Palace.

== Selected personal exhibitions ==
Année	Expositions personnelles
1999	Pol’arisations, Espace Paul Bert, Nontron; Minimax 0–99, Villa Noailles, Hyères
2002	Matali Crasset for Dornbracht : update/3 spaces in one, Galerie Ulrich Fiedler, Cologne
2003	sliding living room, artconnexion, Lille; Sunic, galerie Gandy, Prague; Un pas de côté, Mudac, Lausanne; Unpacking design, Victoria & Albert museum, Londres; Homemade, Grand Hornu, Hornu
2005	Link, Otto gallery, Bologne
2006	Soundscapes, Cooper Hewit National museum of design, New York; Springtherapy, SM's, s'Hertogenbosch
2007	A rebours avec Peter Halley, galerie Thaddaeus Ropac, Paris
2008	matali crasset – Franck van Houtte : conversation, Design museum, Gand; In vino veritas, Gandy gallery, Bratislava; Permis de construire, cité de l’architecture, Paris; Another logic of…, Rabih Hage gallery, Londres; Living wood, galerie Thaddaeus Ropac, Paris
2009	Hyperactif / New Territorie au centre des arts d'Enghien-les-Bains, Enghien-les-Bains
2010	In vino veritas, Mudac, Lausanne
2011	Le Blobterre de Matali, Centre Pompidou, Paris
2012	Le blobterre de matali, Istanbul Modern, Istanbul
2013	Le voyage en uchronie, galerie Thaddaeus Ropac, Pantin; Le voyage en uchronie, Designblock, Prague
2014	Le blobterre de matali/interactions végétales, Forum Meyrin, Genève
2016	Reinventare un mondo commune, Pavillon Unicredit, Milan; We trust in wood, Synagogue de Delme, Delme
2017	Le blobterre de matali, Centre Pompidou, Malaga
2018	saule et les Hooppies, Centre Pompidou, Paris; matali crasset : les capes, The Cultural gallery, Monaco
2019	matali crasset : wood, Chesa Planta, the cultural gallery, St Moritz; matali crasset : la table botanique, Palazzo Soranzo Van Axel, the Muse gallery, Venise

== Works ==
Matali Crasset's creations are present in many public collections in France, Centre Pompidou, Musée des arts décoratifs of Paris National Centre for Plastic Arts, Fonds municipal d'art contemporain de la Ville de Paris, FRAC Nord Pas de Calais, Consortium Museum, and in many international institutions, MoMA, Art Institute of Chicago, Mudac in Lausanne (Switzerland), Indianapolis Museum of Art, Grand Hornu (Belgium), MAK Vienna (Austria).

=== Research ===
- MIXtree Salon d'interface musicale, 2005, Centre Georges Pompidou
- Easy China, Frac Nord-Pas-de-Calais, 2005

=== Scenography of contemporary art exhibitions ===
- Superwarhol, curator : Germano Celant, Grimaldi Forum, Monaco, 2003
- Printemps de septembre, Chill out, Toulouse, 2003
- Salon de Montrouge, curator : Stéphane Corréard, depuis 2009
- Expositions fleuves, Cneai, Chatou, 2009

=== Scenography of concerts ===
- Pierre Lapointe, Amours, délices et orgues, 2017

=== Architecture ===
- Le Nichoir (2011) et La Noisette (2012), Woodland houses, public commission, Le Vent des forêts, Meuse.
- Le pigeonnier Capsule, Caudry leisure centre, 2003. Work carried out as part of the Fondation de France's Nouveaux commanditaires.
- Hi Hotel, Nice, 2003
- SM's, musée d'arts décoratifs et d'art contemporain, s'Herogenbosch, 2005
- HI beach, Hi hôtel, Nice
- Tout'ouvert, Nice), 2006
- Les pastilles Restaurant , Cap 3000, Saint Laurent du Var, 2009
- Nouvel Odéon, cinema, Paris, 2009
- Ménagerie de Verre, Paris, 2009
- Maison des Petits, Cent quatre, Paris, 2009
- DAR HI, ecolodge, Nefta, Tunisia, 2010
- Hi Matic Hôtel, Paris, 2011
- Sledge house, Nice, 2011
- Petit salon de la maison des Petits, Cent quatre, Paris, 2013

=== Objects ===
Matali Crasset works with international publishers, Alessi, Campeggi, Danese, Domeau & Péres, Le Buisson, Ikea, Plust.

- Din Set, 2005
- Evolute, lamp, Danese, 2004
- Sac Nido, bag, 2006
- City brunch, 2004
- Okaidi, children's clothing collection in 2013 and 2014
- PS tray, Ikea, 2014
- We trust in wood, 2015
- Vino sospeso, Bordeaux, 2019

=== Furniture ===
- Quand Jim monte à Paris, Photo, Domeau & Pérès, 1995
- Permis de construire sofa, Domeau & Péres 2000
- Téo de 2 à 3, Domeau & Pérès, 1998
- Concentré de vie, sofa, Campeggi
- PS Wardrobe, Ikea, 2014

== Décorations ==
- Ordre des Arts et des Lettres: Commander, 31 août 2018
- Ordre national du Mérite: Knight, 16 May 2008
- Legion of Honour: Knight, 14 April 2017

== Bibliography ==
- Jean-Pierre Delarge, Dictionnaire des arts plastiques modernes et contemporains, Paris, Gründ, 2001 [lire en ligne]
- M. Crasset (2012). Matali Crasset (in French). Editions Norma. ISBN 978-2915542455.
- Emmanuelle Lallement (2007). Matali Crasset: Spaces 2000-2007 (in French). Daab gmbh. ISBN 978-3937718897.
- M. Crasset (2006). Matali Crasset (in French). Pyramyd. ISBN 2-35017-048-9.
- Claude Parent (2006). Emergences. Pyramyd. ISBN 2350170284.
- Emmanuelle (2002). Matali Crasset : Un pas de côté (1991-2002) (in French). Somogy. ISBN 285056575X.
- Matali Crasset (2002). Le Pigeonnier. Pyramyd. ISBN 2910565602.
- Choi, Leeji. "Matali Crasset Interview." Designboom | Architecture & Design Magazine, September 20, 2013, www.designboom.com/interviews/matali-crasset-designboom-interview/.
- Chronopoulos, George. "Exclusive Interview with Matali Crasset." Delood, November 21, 2011, www.delood.com/design/exclusive-interview-matali-crasset.
- Crasset, Matali. "Matali Crasset." Matali Crasset, www.matalicrasset.com/. "Interview: Matali Crasset.” La Revue Du Design, November 10, 2010, www.larevuedudesign.com/2010/11/10/interview-designer-matali-crasset/.
- Leff, Cathy. “Matali Crasset's Intentional Design.” Cultured Magazine, March 7, 2018, www.culturedmag.com/matali-crassets-intentional-design/.

== Filmography ==
- Dar-Hi by Matali Crasset, documentary film, Christophe Dumoulin and David Haremza, 2013.film-documentaire.fr
- matali crasset : le design ludique et politique, documentary film, Rémy Batteault, (France 5 November 9, 2019).
