= Order Out of Chaos: Man's New Dialogue with Nature =

1984 philosophy of science book

- Author: Ilya Prigogine and Isabelle Stengers
- Publisher: Bantam Books
- Publication date: 1984

Order Out of Chaos: Man’s New Dialogue with Nature is a 1984 popular science book co-written by philosopher of science Isabelle Stengers and physicist Ilya Prigogine. The book argues that the sciences are undergoing a revolution prompted by the discoveries of thermodynamics.

== Summary ==
Stengers and Prigogine write that there is a fundamental tension in science between "dynamics" and "thermodynamics". They state that in dynamical theories such as classical mechanics, general relativity, and quantum mechanics, the basic processes of nature are considered to be "deterministic and reversible": Newton’s, Einstein’s, and Schrödinger’s equations would all work the same way if time ran backwards. In thermodynamics, by contrast, the universe is governed by an irreversible "arrow of time". This is because the second law of thermodynamics, which introduces the idea of entropy, describes the probabilistic tendency for macroscopic systems to become increasingly "disordered" over time.

The authors write that although the laws of thermodynamics suggest that matter tends towards increasing disorganisation, evolution seems to produce ever more complex self-organising structures like cells and animals. This situation led some scientists, such as Erwin Schrödinger, to suggest that living matter must obey different physical laws to non-living matter, and others, such as Ludwig Boltzmann, to suggest that the apparent directionality of entropy is produced by our limited knowledge of all possible states of a system. Stengers and Prigogine disagree with such interpretations, suggesting that irreversibility is a real, universal phenomenon.

According to the authors, systems at thermal equilibrium are completely chaotic: entropy is maximised. In such conditions, the behaviour of individual components are indeed deterministic and reversible. However, the authors suggest that in non-equilibrium systems, instability gives rise to intrinsic randomness, which gives rise to irreversible processes. Non-equilibrium "dissipative structures" like living organisms can form and perpetuate themselves so long as they receive inputs of "free energy" from an external source. Thus, Stengers and Prigogine argue, "Nonequilibrium is the source of order. Nonequilibrium brings 'order out of chaos'."

== Reception ==
The book received generally positive reviews upon release. Stephen G. Brush termed it "provocative, fascinating and anchored in experimental science", while James Gleick described it as "a highly individual, philosophical view of the relationships between thermodynamics and dynamical systems". Some reviewers expressed concerns that the accessibility of the book obscured or misrepresented aspects of its scientific contents, for instance by equating entropy with "disorder". John Maynard Smith supported the main conclusions of the book but took issue with the authors' suggestion that thermodynamics provided a more "exhilarating" image of the universe than dynamics, writing: "If non-equilibrium thermodynamics makes poets happier, so be it. But we must accept or reject it on other grounds."

Order Out of Chaos is regarded as having contributed to the popularisation of complexity science. Prigogine and Stengers’s ideas have been applied to areas of communication theory, biology, and literary criticism.
