= Isabelle Stengers =

Belgian philosopher of science and scientist (born 1949)

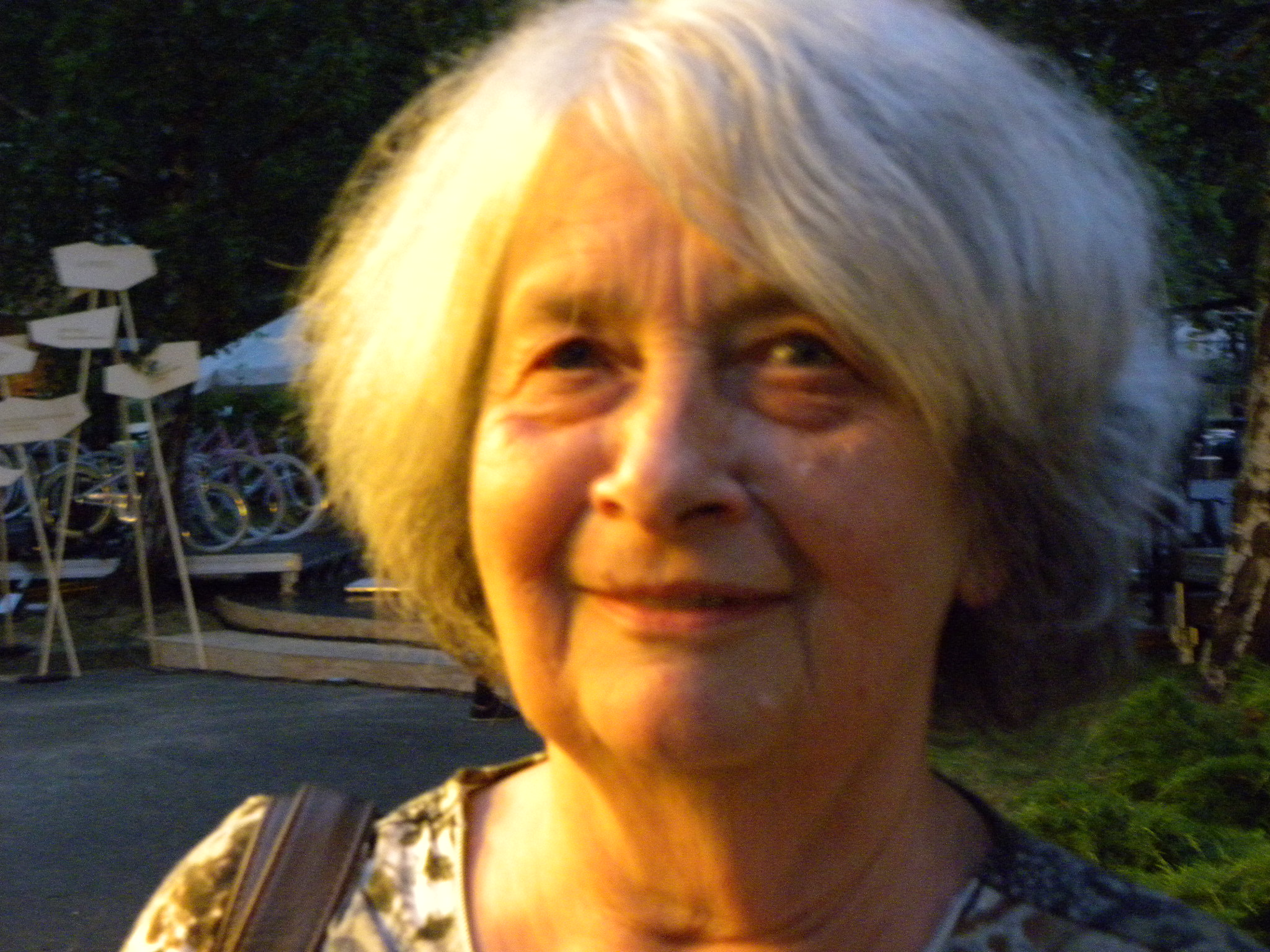
- Born: 1949 (age 76–77); Brussels, Belgium
- Father: Jean Stengers
- Awards: Ludwik Fleck Prize (2013)

Education
- Education: Université libre de Bruxelles
- Doctoral advisor: Ilya Prigogine

Philosophical work
- Era: Contemporary philosophy
- Region: Western philosophy
- School: Continental philosophy Speculative realism
- Institutions: Université libre de Bruxelles
- Main interests: Philosophy of science

Isabelle Stengers (/stɛnˈɡɛərz/; French: [stɛnɡɛʁs]; born 1949) is a Belgian philosopher, noted for her work in the philosophy of science. Trained as a chemist, she has collaborated with Russian-Belgian chemist Ilya Prigogine and French philosopher/sociologist Bruno Latour among others, and has written widely on the history of science as well as philosophers such as Gilles Deleuze, Alfred North Whitehead, Donna Haraway, and Michel Serres.

== Biography ==
Stengers is the daughter of the historian Jean Stengers. She studied chemistry, graduating with a degree in the subject from the Université libre de Bruxelles.

== Work ==
Her research interests include the philosophy of science and the history of science. She holds her Professorship in the Philosophy of Science at the Université libre de Bruxelles and received the grand prize for philosophy from the Académie Française in 1993. Stengers has written on English philosopher Alfred North Whitehead; other work has included Continental philosophers such as Michel Serres, Gilbert Simondon, Gilles Deleuze, or Vinciane Despret, as well as North American philosophers of science and of the environment such as Donna Haraway. Stengers has also collaborated with psychiatrist Léon Chertok, and the sociologist of science Bruno Latour.

An important part of her recent work consists of discussions with and translations of Donna Haraway's work, which she describes as a difficult task: "I must admit that translating Haraway is not easy, because the writing which she practices is, in her own terms, of a 'technological' order. That writing operates, that words act, that stories, and the way they are told, matter, is always the case for Haraway – including when textual rhetoric aims at situating the reader in the position of having to follow an argumentation with no way around, to share a point of view presented as fundamentally anonymous. Hence, this includes when the text steps aside in favour of the idea with which the point is to agree and of which it has been the mere vehicle. As for Haraway's text, it does not step aside: as is the case with a poetic text, to limit oneself to 'acknowledging' it constitutes a slight mistake." The interconnectedness of the thought of Isabelle Stengers, Donna Haraway, Bruno Latour, and Vinciane Despret, among others, is described by Donna Haraway as a web of "string figures."

Stengers has written books on chaos theory with Ilya Prigogine, the Russian-Belgian physical chemist and Nobel Laureate noted for his work on dissipative structures, complex systems, and irreversibility, especially Order out of Chaos (1984) and The End of Certainty: Time, Chaos and the New Laws of Nature (1997). Stengers and Prigogine often draw from the work of Gilles Deleuze, treating him as an important philosophical source to think through questions regarding irreversibility and the universe as an open system. Stengers' most recent work has turned to her proposition of Cosmopolitics, a key aspect of which Bruno Latour refers to as the "progressive composition of a common world" in which the non-human and the human are intimately entwined, and secondly, her revisiting and pragmatic modulation of the speculative philosophy of Alfred North Whitehead. Cosmopolitics won the Ludwik Fleck Prize in 2013.

== Partial bibliography ==
- Prigogine, Ilya and Isabelle Stengers. La Nouvelle Alliance (1979)
- Prigogine, Ilya and Isabelle Stengers. Order Out of Chaos: Man's New Dialogue with Nature, University of Michigan: Bantam Books (1984)
- Stengers, Isabelle and Chertok L. "A critique of psychoanalytic reason: hypnosis as a scientific problem from Lavoisier to Lacan", Noel Evans M (trans.), Stanford: Stanford University Press (1992)
- Prigogine, Ilya and Isabelle Stengers. The End of Certainty: Time, Chaos and the New Laws of Nature, Free Press (1997)
- Stengers, Isabelle. Power and Invention: Situating Science, Bains P (trans.), Minneapolis: University of Minnesota Press (1997)
- Stengers, Isabelle. The Invention of Modern Science, Smith D.W (trans.), Minneapolis: University of Minnesota Press (2000)
- Stengers, Isabelle. Cosmopolitics I, Bononno, R (trans.), Minneapolis: University of Minnesota Press (2010)
- Stengers, Isabelle. Cosmopolitics II, Bononno, R (trans.), Minneapolis: University of Minnesota Press (2011)
- Stengers, Isabelle and Pignarre P. Capitalist Sorcery: Breaking the Spell, Goffey A (Trans.), Palgrave Macmillan (2011)
- Stengers, Isabelle. Thinking with Whitehead: a free and wild creation of concepts. Harvard University Press. 2011. (translation of original: Penser avec Whitehead, 2002)
- Stengers, Isabelle. In Catastrophic Times. Resisting the Coming Barbarism, Goffey, A. (trans.), Open Humanities Press (2015)
- Stengers, Isabelle. Another Science is Possible: A Manifesto for Slow Science, Muecke, S. (trans.), Polity Press (2018)

== See also ==
- New materialism
