= Vinciane Despret =

Belgian philosopher

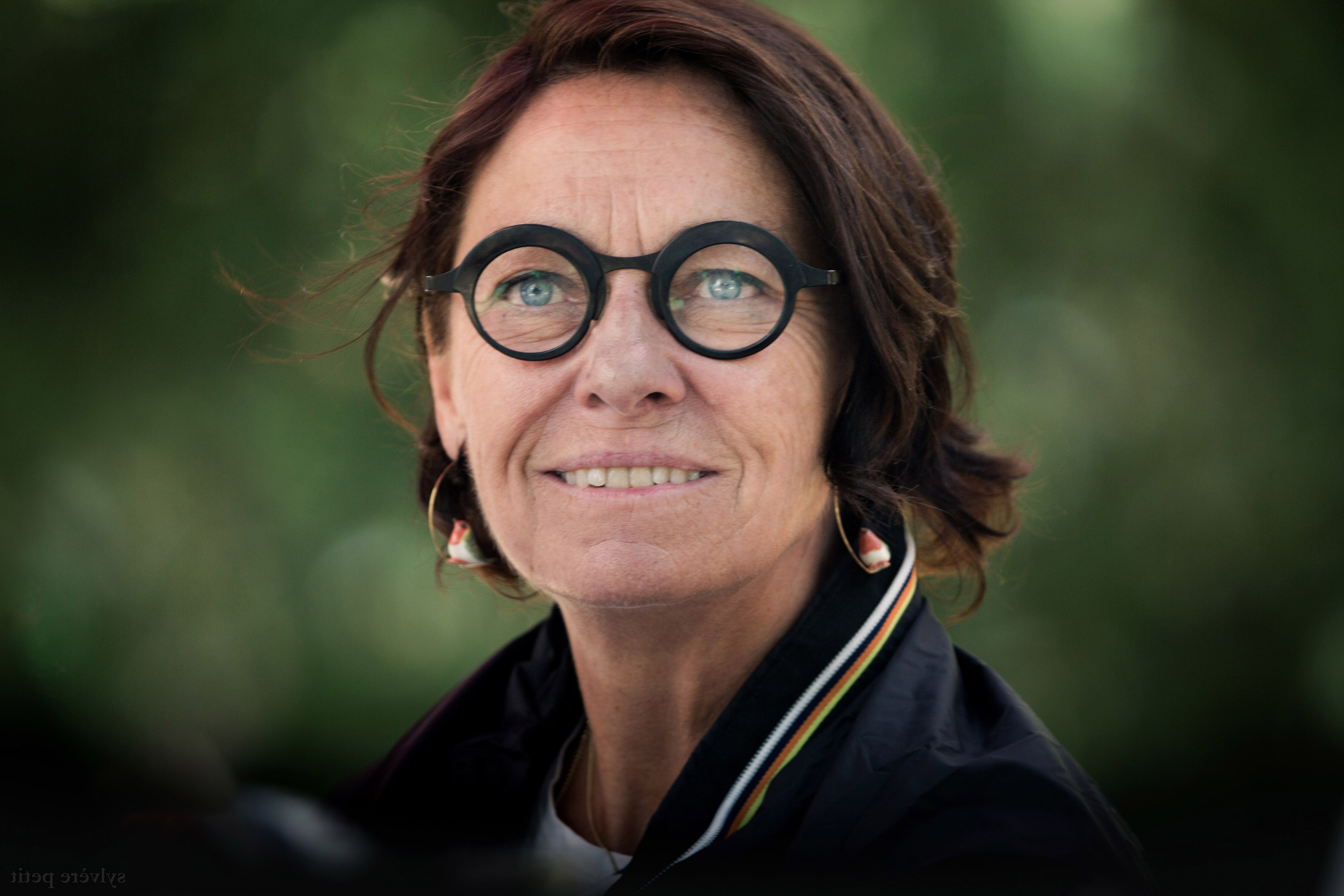
- Belgian philosopher of science
- Born: 12 November 1959; Brussels
- Occupation: Philosopher of science
- Spouse: Jean-Marie Lemaire
- Children: 1
- Awards: Prix du livre environnement mention spéciale 2021, Prix PhiloMonaco de l'Essai 2016

Education
- Education: Université de Liège
- Thesis: Savoir des passions et passions des savoirs ("Knowledge of passions and passions of knowledge")
- Academic advisors: Bruno Latour & Isabelle Stengers

Philosophical work
- Institutions: Université de Liège & Université libre de Bruxelles
- Language: French
- Main interests: Philosophy, psychology, anthropology, ethnology
- Notable works: Au bonheur des morts, Autobiographie d'un poulpe

Vinciane Despret (born in Brussels, on 12 November 1959) is a Belgian philosopher of science. She is notable for her innovations in ethnography through philosophical thought and ethological methodologies, approaches that have significantly impacted the way that scientists study and work with non-human animals.

== Education and academic career ==
Vinciane Despret first graduated in 1988 with a License in philosophy before studying psychology at the University of Liège in Liège, Belgium. She graduated with a license in psychology in 1991. She then became fascinated by ethnography and oriented herself toward philosophy of science. She defended her thesis (Savoir des passions et passions des savoirs ("Knowledge of passions and passions of knowledge") for her doctorate in 1996, under the supervision of Bruno Latour and Isabelle Stengers.

She is a philosopher, associate professor, and researcher in the Department of Philosophy at the University of Liège. She also teaches in the faculties of philosophy and social sciences and of psychology, educational sciences and speech therapy at the Free University of Brussels.

In 2007, she curated the exhibition Bêtes et hommes at La Villette in Paris.

With Raphaël Larrère in 2014, she edited Les Animaux : deux ou trois choses que nous savons d'eux, published by Éditions Hermann, coll. "Colloque de Cerisy", proceedings of the July 2010 colloquium.

== Research ==
She works in both philosophy and ethnography, particularly from a perspective that leads her to consider the political consequences of our theoretical choices: "which leads me to become increasingly interested in, on the one hand, the question of how to live with animals, and on the other hand, the political questions posed to us today by psychotherapeutic practices with humans."

Following the death of her youngest sister, she wrote Au bonheur des morts, a book that describes how the dead enter the lives of the living.

In writing about Despret's work for Theory, Culture & Society, the ethnographer Stephen Muecke (Note: Muecke also translated her work, Au bonheur des morts - Récits de ceux qui restent, into English: Our Grateful Dead: Stories of Those Left Behind.) and senior researcher Iwona Janicka describe her as a "foundational thinker" in the consolidation of the field of animal studies. Her ethological methodologies in the field, where she interrogates the fundamental concepts of "society," "self," and "other," are considered to be innovative. For instance, in a 2011 lecture at the Natural History Museum, London, Despret discussed primatologist Thelma Rowell’s challenge to the assumption that primates are more intelligent than other animals, emphasizing how research questions themselves can reflect social and scientific hierarchies.

More generally, at the heart of her work lies the question of the relationship between observers and the observed during the conduct of scientific research. She undertakes a critical understanding of how science is fabricated, following scientists doing fieldwork and the way they actively create links and specific relationships to their objects of study. Her early work on Arabian babblers in the Negev desert developed a reflective account of ethological fieldwork, examining not only animal behavior but also the practices through which ethologists observe and interpret it.

Another example which she gave in an interview for the UNESCO Courier is the more well-known example of rats used for scientific research. She closely analyzed how researchers train the rats to go through the maze and this led her to question whether it would be better for understanding rat intelligence and behavior if the rat were encouraged to find their own, without human intervention.

Despret's methodologies are generally aligned with such critical thinkers in philosophy and anthropology of science as Isabelle Stengers, (Note: Stengers and Despret authored a book together: Les faiseuses d'histoires: Que font les femmes à la pensée ?. Éditions La Découverte, 2011.) Donna Haraway, and Bruno Latour.

== Awards and distinctions ==
She was awarded the Microsoft Prize for Scientific Humanities from Sciences Po for her entire body of work in 2008, and the Wernaers International Fund Prize for Research and Dissemination of Knowledge in 2009.

She was appointed to the rank of Chevalier, Walloon Merit. Later, in 2023, she won the Walloon Woman of the Year distinction.

Her book Au bonheur des morts. Récits de ceux qui restent (Empecheurs, 2015) won the PhiloMonaco essay prize in 2016. It has since been translated into English, Spanish, and Portuguese. In English, the title is: Our Grateful Dead: Stories of Those Left Behind.

Her book Autobiographie d'un poulpe (Actes Sud, 2021) won the Prix du livre environnement mention spéciale (awarded by the Fondation Veolia) in 2021.

In 2021, she received the Centre Pompidou's l'intellectuelle de l'année distinction in Paris. A series of events throughout the year was organized by the organization, including a performance with an octopus in April 2021, coinciding with the book's release. The same year, she won the Prix Moron, awarded by the Académie Française for her entire body of work.

== Personal life ==
In a 2004 autobiographical note, Despret wrote that she was married to psychiatrist Jean-Marie Lemaire and had one child.

== Selected works ==
=== Books in French ===
- Naissance d'une théorie éthologique: la danse du cratérope écaillé, La Découverte, coll. Les Empêcheurs de penser en rond, 1996.
- Ces émotions qui nous fabriquent: ethnopsychologie de l'authenticité, La Découverte: coll. Les Empêcheurs de penser en rond, 1999.
- Quand le loup habitera avec l'agneau, La Découverte: coll. "Les Empêcheurs de penser en rond," 2002.
- Hans, le cheval qui savait compter, La Découverte: 2004.
- Etre Bête, Arles: Actes Sud, 2007. (Note: She wrote Etre Bête with Jocelyne Porcher)
- Penser comme un rat, Éditiions Quae: 2009.
- Les faiseuses d'histoires. Que font les femmes à la pensée?, Paris: La Découverte (Les empêcheurs de penser en rond), 2011. (Note: She wrote Les faiseuses d'histoires with Isabelle Stengers)
- Que diraient les animaux, si... on leur posait les bonnes questions?, Paris: La Découverte, 2012.
- Au bonheur des morts: récits de ceux qui restent, La Découverte: 2015.
- Habiter en oiseau, Actes Sud, 2019.

=== Works in English translation ===
- Our Emotional Makeup: Ethnopsychology and Selfhood, translated by Marjolijn de Jager. Other Press, 2004.
- Women Who Make a Fuss: The Unfaithful Daughters of Virginia Woolf, translated by April Knutson. Univocal Publishing, 2015. (Note: Original French version: Les faiseuses d'histoires by Despret and Isabelle Stengers.)
- What Would Animals Say If We Asked the Right Questions?, translated by Brett Buchanan. University of Minnesota Press, 2016.
- The Dance of the Arabian Babbler: Birth of an Ethological Theory, translated by Jeffrey Bussolini. University of Minnesota Press, 2021.
- Our Grateful Dead: Stories of Those Left Behind, translated by Stephen Muecke. University of Minnesota Press, 2021.
- Living as a Bird, translated by Helen Morrison. Polity, 2022.

=== Selected articles and chapters ===
- "The Body We Care For: Figures of Anthropo-zoo-genesis." Body & Society, 2004.
- "Sheep Do Have Opinions." In Bruno Latour and Peter Weibel, eds., Making Things Public, 2006.
- "The Becomings of Subjectivity in Animal Worlds." Subjectivity, 2008.
