= Fondation de France =

French organization created in 1969

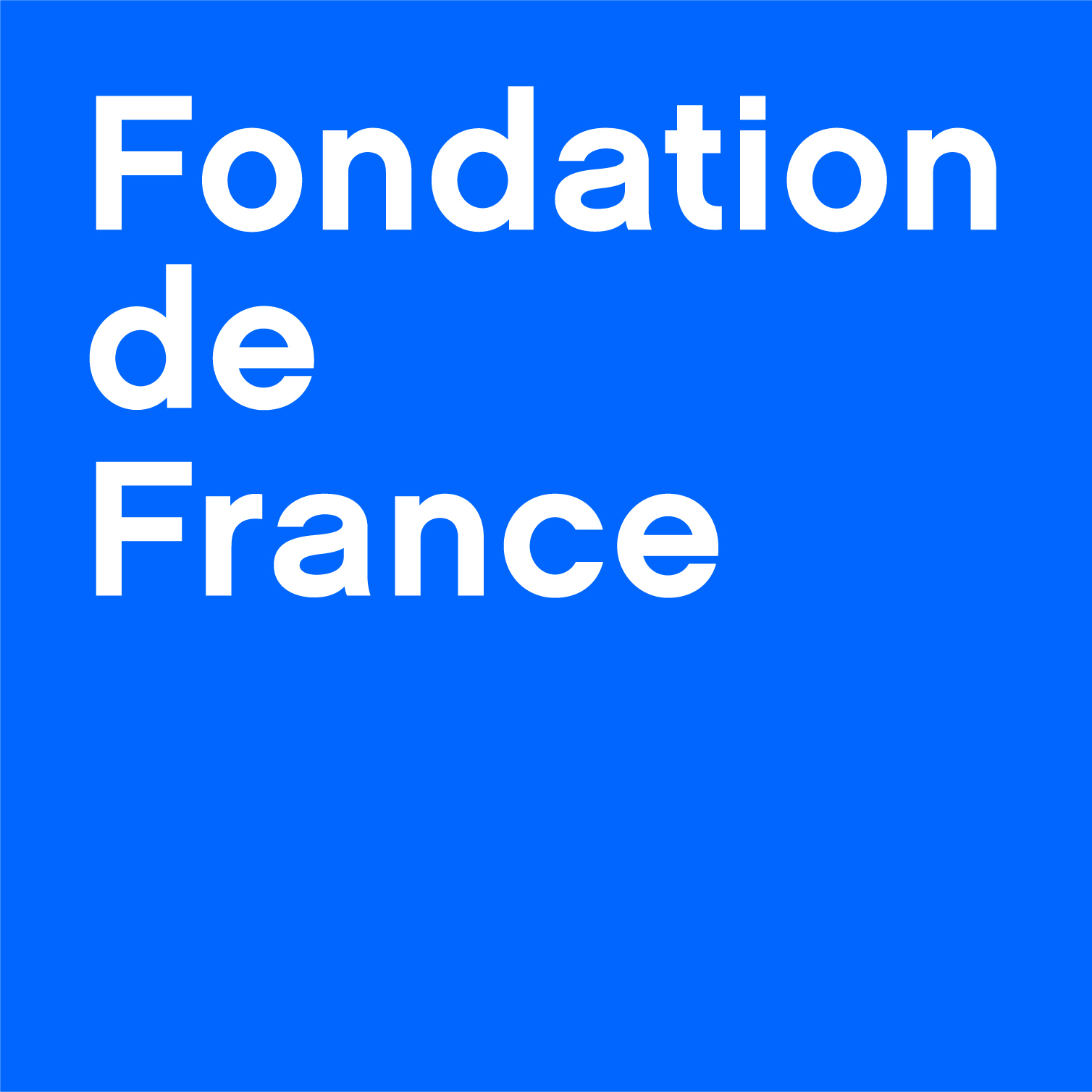
- Formation: 1969
- Founder: Michel Pomey
- Headquarters: Paris, France
- Location: France
- President: Pierre Sellal
- Managing Director: Axelle Davezac
- Website: https://www.fondationdefrance.org

Fondation de France ("Foundation of France") is an independent private organisation, recognised as being in the public interest, and created at the instigation of Charles de Gaulle and André Malraux in an effort to stimulate and foster the growth of philanthropy in France. In the modern day, the organisation brings together donors, founders, and volunteers from across France to provide effective support to a number of charitable causes with the aim to support sustainable solutions for the advancement of society.

== Description ==
The Foundation was established in 1969. Its focus is the elderly, the disabled, children, health, medical and scientific research, culture and the environment. Notable presidents of the foundation include Maurice Schumann (1973–1974), Roger Seydoux de Clausonne (1975–1983) and Hubert Curien (1998–2000). It is a member of the Network of European Foundations for Innovative Cooperation (NEF) and Philea - Philanthropy Europe Association.

On August 4, 2020, the Fondation de France launched an appeal for donations following the double explosion that destroyed the port of Beirut, the capital of Lebanon.
