= Documenta 8 =

1987 art exhibition in Kassel, West Germany

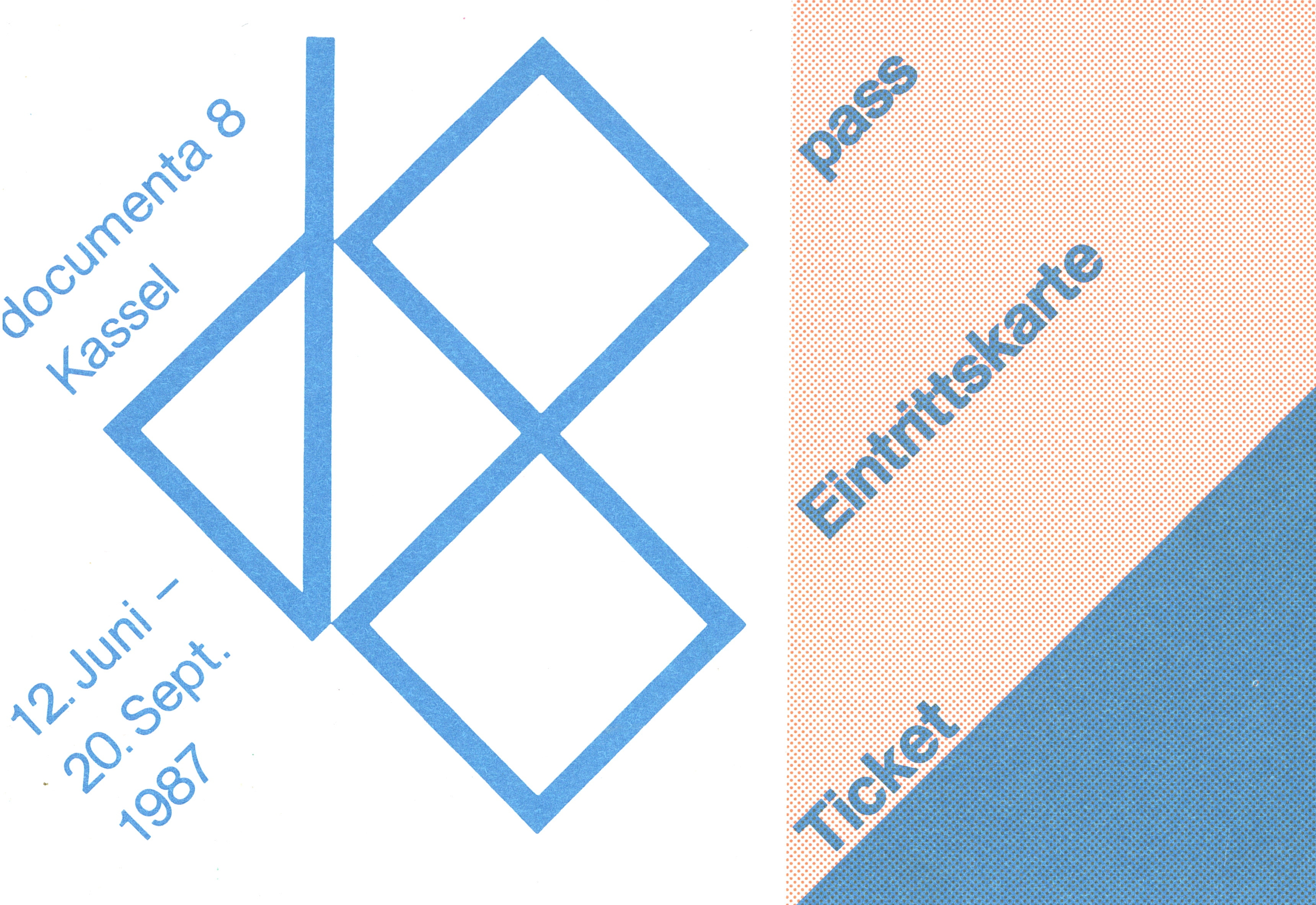
Foto Ticket documenta 8

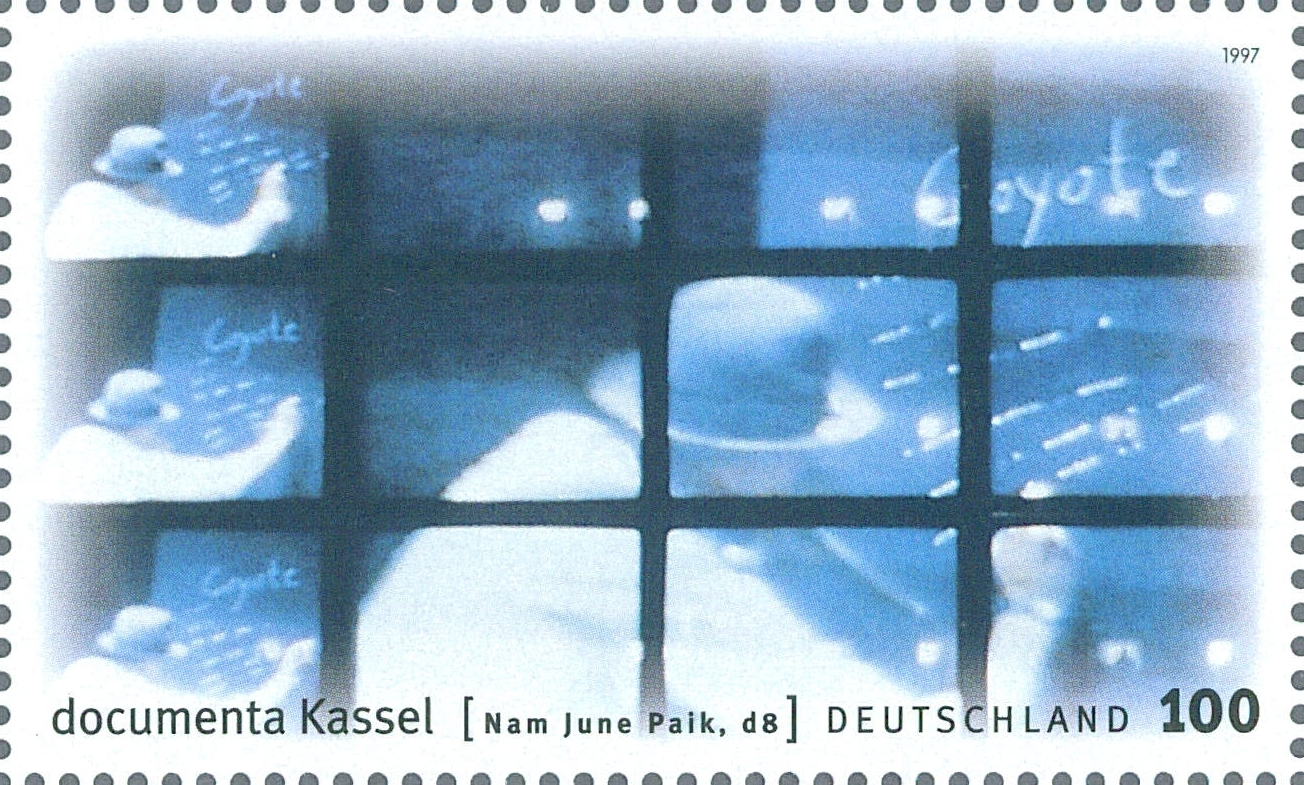
Nam June Paik d8 1997

documenta 8 was the eighth edition of documenta, a quinquennial contemporary art exhibition. It was held between 12 June and 20 September 1987 in Kassel, West Germany. The artistic directors were Manfred Schneckenburger and Edward F. Fry.

== Participants ==
- A Marina Abramović, Adam Noidlt Intermission, Jonathan Albert, Pierre Albert-Birot, Akademia Ruchu, Terry Allen, Juan Allende-Blin, Charles Amirkhanian, Beth Anderson, Laurie Anderson, Ida Applebroog, Ron Arad, Siah Armajani, John Armleder, Antonin Artaud, Richard Artschwager, ASA, Robert Ashley, Charles Atlas, Alice Aycock, Studio Azzurro
- B Hugo Ball, Giacomo Balla, Richard Baquié, Joan La Barbara, Clarence Barlow, François Bauchet, Jürgen Becker, Max Bense, Luciano Berio, Barry Bermange, Joseph Beuys, Lapo Binazzi, Dara Birnbaum, Óscar Tusquets Blanca, Karl Oskar Blase, Lyn Blumenthal, Christian Boltanski, Florian Borkenhagen, Eberhard Bosslet, Andreas Brandolini, Andrea Branzi, George Brecht, Shawn Brixey, Bazon Brock, Christine Brodbeck, Klaus vom Bruch, Heinrich Brummack, Wojciech Bruszewski, Chris Burden, Emil František Burian, Scott Burton, Jean-Marc Bustamante, James Lee Byars
- C Jennifer Cadero, John Cage, Robert Cahen, Francesco Cangiullo, Monty Cantsin, Valerie Caris, Ian Carr-Harris, Joëlle de La Casinière, Giorgio Cattani, Michel Chion, Welimir Chlebnikow, Henri Chopin, Henning Christiansen, City Souvenir, Carlfriedrich Claus, Cloud Chamber, Bob Cobbing, Norman Cohn, Robin Collyer, Philip Corner, Giorgio Barberio Corsetti, Tony Cragg, Heinz von Cramer, Leonard Crow Dog, Mary Crow Dog, Enzo Cucchi, Alvin Curran
- D Dawn, Paolo Deganello, Maurizio Della Nave, Fortunato Depero, Antonio Dias, Die Tödliche Doris, Charles Dodge, Reinhard Döhl, Ugo Dossi, Jürgen Drescher, François Dufrêne
- E Bogomir Ecker, Nicolaus Einhorn, Ulrich Eller, Ed Emshwiller, Toshikatsu Endō, Max Ernst, Etant donnés
- F Rainer Werner Fassbinder, Luc Ferrari, Ian Hamilton Finlay, Lili Fischer, Thomas F. Fischer, Eric Fischl, Terry Flaxton, Peter Fischli & David Weiss, Bill Fontana, Terry Fox, Marlis A. Franke, Gloria Friedmann
- G Rosa Galindo & Pedro Garhel, Ferran García Sevilla, General Idea, Jochen Gerz, John Giorno, Gary Glassman, Vinko Globokar, Jean-Luc Godard, Heiner Goebbels, Ulrich Görlich, Jack Goldstein, Malcolm Goldstein, Zvi Goldstein, Leon Golub, Peter Gordon, Antony Gormley, Gorilla Tapes, Peter Greenham, Robert Grosvenor, Group Material, Glenn Gould, Ingo Günther, Brion Gysin
- H Hans Haacke, Gusztáv Hámos, Peter Handke, Sten Hanson, Ferdinand Hardekopf, Ludwig Harig, Helen Mayer Harrison, Newton Harrison, Raoul Hausmann, Haus-Rucker-Co, R.I.P. Hayman, Doris Sorrel Hays, Heinrich Mucken, Helmut Heißenbüttel, Bernard Heidsieck, Hans G. Helms, Pierre Henry, Albert Hien, Dick Higgins, Gary Hill, Åke Hodell, Gavin Hodge, Hans Hollein, Jenny Holzer, Nan Hoover, Toine Horvers, Madelon Hooykaas, Stephan Huber, Richard Huelsenbeck, Stephan von Huene, Hans Ulrich Humpert
- I Isidore Isou, Arata Isozaki, Sanja Iveković
- J Alfredo Jaar, Ernst Jandl, Marcel Janco, Alfred Jarry, Sergei Yesenin, Magdalena Jetelová, Bengt Emil Johnson, Tom Johnson, Joan Jonas, Arsenije Jovanović, Rolf Julius, Patricia Jünger
- K Mauricio Kagel, Wassily Kandinsky, Allan Kaprow, Dani Karavan, Tadashi Kawamata, Niek Kemps, Anselm Kiefer, Jürgen Klauke, Norbert Klassen, Josef Paul Kleihues, Astrid Klein, Florian Kleinefenn, Michael Klier, Monica Klingler, Carole Ann Klonarides, Imi Knoebel, Laura Knott, Alison Knowles, Komar & Melamid, Kō Nakajima, Richard Kostelanetz, Richard Kriesche, Ferdinand Kriwet, Harry de Kroon, Aleksei Kruchenykh, Barbara Kruger, Krypton, Christina Kubisch, Shigeko Kubota, Klaus Kumrow
- L Ilmar Laaban, Marie Jo Lafontaine, Wolfgang Laib, Nikolaus Lang, Bertrand Lavier, Ange Leccia, Maurice Lemaître, Les Levine, Annea Lockwood, Joan Logue, Robert Longo, Arrigo Lora-Totino, Chip Lord, Alvin Lucier, Wolfgang Luy
- M Jackson Mac Low, Magazzini Criminali, Liz Magor, Vladimir Mayakovsky, Mako Idemitsu, Kazimir Malevich, Stéphane Mallarmé, Chris Mann, Raoul Marek, Filippo T. Marinetti, Javier Mariscal, Stuart Marshall, Dalibor Martinis, Friederike Mayröcker, Mickey McGowan, Steve McCaffery, Bruce McLean, Alessandro Mendini, Gerhard Merz, Olaf Metzel, Branda Miller, Minus Delta t, Franz Mon, Andrei Monastyrski, Meredith Monk, Charles Willard Moore, Robert Morris, Jasper Morrison, Tim Morrison, Charles Morrow, Alexander Mosolov, Muchamor, Heiner Müller
- N Massimo Nannucci, Maurizio Nannucci, Joseph Nechvatal, Wsewolod Nikolajewitsch Nekrassow, Wolfgang Nestler, Boris Nieslony, Vladimir Lalo Nikolić, Maria Nordman, Ladislav Novák, Danièle Nyst & Jacques Louis Nyst
- O Marcel Odenbach, Jürgen O. Olbrich, Pauline Oliveros, Yoko Ono, Julian Opie, Anna Oppermann, Tony Oursler
- P Nam June Paik, Charlemagne Palestine, Oskar Pastior, Gustav Peichl, Giuseppe Penone, Pentagon, Arthur Pétronio, Francis Picabia, Pablo Picasso, Steve Piccolo, Hermann Pitz, platform, Robert HP Platz, Fabrizio Plessi, Paul Pörtner, Dmitri Prigov, Bernhard Prinz, proT
- Q Carlo Quartucci
- R David Rabinowitch, Norbert Radermacher, Horațiu Rădulescu, Socìetas Raffaello Sanzio, Fritz Rahmann, M.Raskin Stichting Ens., Daniel Reeves, Bruno Reichlin, Fabio Reinhart, Guglielmo Renzi, Gerhard Richter, Joachim Ringelnatz, Amadeo Roldán, Ulrike Rosenbach, Rachel Rosenthal, Aldo Rossi, Jerome Rothenberg, Projekt Rübenspäher, Lev Rubinstein, Ulrich Rückriem, Eugeniusz Rudnik, Gerhard Rühm, Tomáš Ruller, Stephen Ruppenthal, Luigi Russolo, Walther Ruttmann
- S Annamaria Sala, Marzio Sala, John Sanborn, Denis Santachiara, Carles Santos Ventura, Yuri Shaporin, Julião Sarmento, Erik Satie, Pierre Schaeffer, R. Murray Schafer, Paul Scheerbart, David Schein, Winfried Scheuer, Arleen Schloss, Dieter Schnebel, Helmut Schober, Rob Scholte, Alf Schuler, Thomas Schulz, Thomas Schütte, Buky Schwartz, Fritz Schwegler, Kurt Schwitters, Walter Serner, Richard Serra, Michel Seuphor, Roman Signer, SITE, Michael Smith, Snowball Project, Susana Solano, Ettore Sottsass, Adriano Spatola, Serge Spitzer, Klaus Staeck, Elsa Stansfield, Philippe Starck, Ronald Steckel, Lisa Steele, Gertrude Stein, Florian Steinbiß, Demetrio Stratos, Akio Suzuki
- T Mark Tansey, Anne Tardos, Relly Tarlo & Jacoba Bedaux, Ilse Teipelke, Nahum Tevet, Kim Tomczak, TOTEM, George Trakas, Tsuneo Nakai, Tristan Tzara
- U Ulay, Micha Ullman, Oswald Mathias Ungers
- V Edgar Varèse, Ruggero Vasari, Woody Vasulka, Edin Velez, Jan Vercruysse, Jacques Vieille, Xavier Villaverde, Bill Viola, Thomas Virnich, Paul de Vree
- W Manfred Wakolbinger, Jeff Wall, Franz Erhard Walther, David Ward, Zbigniew Warpechowski, Dsiga Wertow, Stefan Wewerka, Robert Wilson, Michael Witlatschil, Krzysztof Wodiczko, Silvio Wolf, Erich Wonder, Wolf Wondratschek, Bill Woodrow, Andrei Voznesensky, Paul Wühr, Stephan Wunderlich
- Y Mika Yoshizawa, Graham Young
- Z Wilhelm Zobl
