= László László Révész =

Hungarian artist

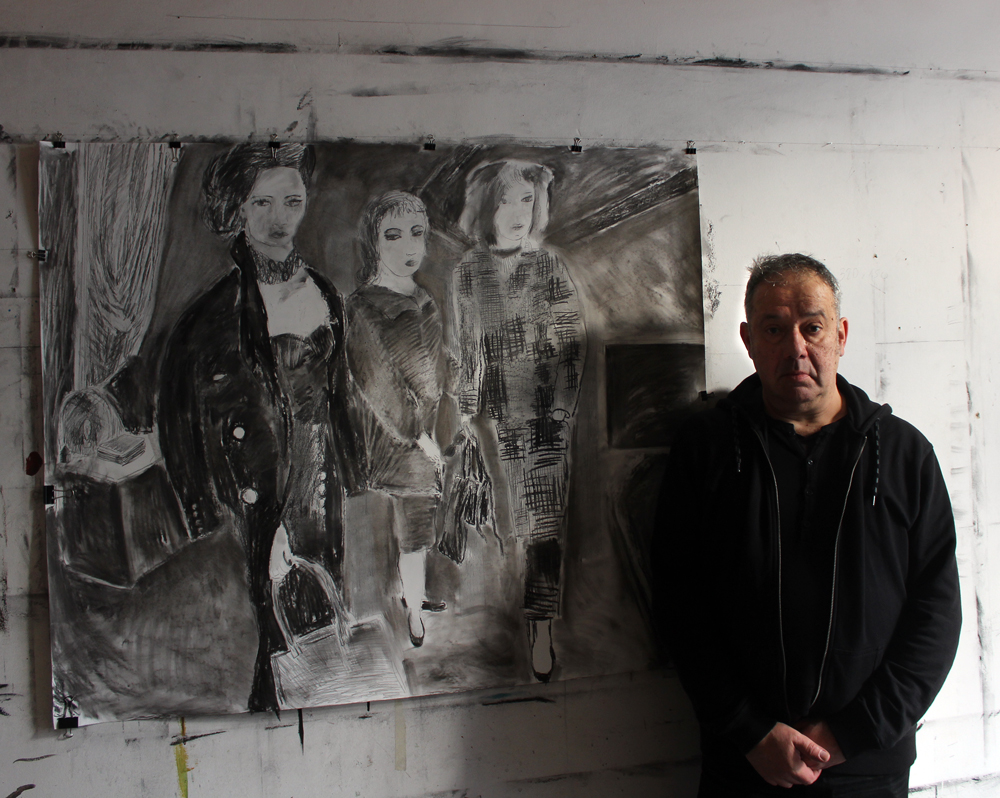
- Portrait of the artist with his work
- Born: May 27, 1957; Budapest, Hungary
- Died: March 11, 2021 (aged 63)
- Known for: Painting, drawing, performance art, printmaking

László László Révész (1957–2021) was a Hungarian painter and performance artist. He received a Master of Fine Arts degree in painting from the Hungarian University of Fine Arts in 1981 and an MA in animation from Moholy-Nagy University of Art and Design Budapest in 1986. Révész defended his DLA dissertation "Pictorial narrative in the Fine Arts" in 2010.

His art covers a range of media including drawing, painting, performance, film, video, sculpture and installation. He has worked at various places including Pannonia Film Studio, the Hungarian National Television in Budapest, Vox Television in Cologne, Germany, Faro Disegni furniture textile design company in Rome, Italy, the Hungarian Cultural Center in New York City, USA. From 2009 he has worked as an associate professor at the Hungarian University of Fine Arts. In 2014 he had a screening at MUSA, Vienna where he presented his light shadow plays animation series. In 2013 he cofounded the Karkade Company. He wrote and directed two plays with them; CAN (2014) and Blue Panther (2015).

== Early life and education ==
László László Révész was born in Budapest, Hungary." He showed interest in the visual arts at a very early age.

"One of my earliest memories is me sitting outside in the garden of our house in the shadow of a bush and reading Herbert Read's book about modern painting."

"Books and reading itself were an escape from double negation, from my parents and from reality."

Révész studied at the Hungarian University of Fine Arts painting where he met András Böröcz with whom they started working on performances together from 1978. They were invited artist of Documenta in 1987 with their performance "Dawn Carlos". Révész took part in various creative groups powered by Miklós Erdély. After completing an MA in painting Révész studied animation at Moholy-Nagy University. After graduation Révész designed TV set ups for the Hungarian Television with Zsolt Lengyel. 1992-1994 he also worked on jingles for VOX Television, Cologne Germany.

== Work ==
=== Duo and solo performances: 1978–2001 ===
Révész is known for his narrative performances where he layers multiple historical meanings. He builds up stories which makes the viewer observe his own state to reality and fiction. Révész plays with the opportunity of the contrast which helps the viewer to notice differences in human intentions, actions and reactions. To build this contrast Révész likes to work with educated performers and people coming from a different backgrounds.

Révész began working on performances in 1975. During his studies at the Hungarian University of Fine Arts he met András Böröcz with whom from 1978 they started to work together. Révész and Böröcz produced several performances together that combined literary topos with dadaist fragments. Révész and Böröcz ‘as Dan’ were invited to show Dawn Carlos (1987) at documenta 8. This piece utilizes the literary topos of Schiller's drama and the musical topos of Verdi's opera of the same title. This performance deals with the Nietzschean thought about the "use and abuse of history for life" Signature solo performances include: Révész Rimbaud (1977/78), Businessman at the Time of Recession (1992) - K+K Hotel parking lot; His Master's Voice, Experimental Art Foundation Adelaide Australia (1991/92); The Apple of the Ballerina, 1. Eötvös Lóránd University, 2. Narodna Galeria Bratislava, (1998, 2000) duo performances; Max and Moricz (1981), Gyufa (1982), Jubelee (1982) Spirit of the Mountain (1984), Dawn Carlos (1987), Széf asszonyok, Maryland Institute of Arts Baltimore, The Rivoli, Toronto - Centaurs 1984, Nitty Gritty, Third Eye Centre Glasgow (1985)

=== Stage art and performances from 2013 ===
Révész started to work on performances from 1975. His interest in the presence of the performer's body lead to what he calls "stage art". Presence of the performer is one of the most important elements of any kind of stage work of his and Révész feels at home using it and collaging it into the works. Révész's impact on performing arts is innovative. He seeks to explore new forms of dramaturgical construction of the performance which can move the viewer into the active thinker state of his. His role as a participant went through a change from the first period to the later period. In the earlier works he was a neutral pokerfaced executer of the actions while in the later works he became a witness of the happenings. As the arthistorian Lóránd Hegyi wrote: "Laszlo Laszlo Revesz is operating on the stage of the theater of improbabilities and obscure dramaturgies, while offering destabilizing images and movie-like scenes, packed in a dry, un-personal, objective, descriptive form. In spite of the apparent normality, the scenes reveal the irreversible absence of any rational explanation for the figures’ behavior and actions, the total disconnection between space, time, action and language, and the fatal disorder of the hidden relations between the diverse elements of that crazy scenario." The first signature work of the second period is CAN (2013), which was made under the umbrella of Karkade Company.

=== Drawings and paintings ===
The director of Musée d’Art Moderne de Saint-Etienne, France Lóránd Hegyi says about the drawings of Révész: "The subversive, destabilizing and irritating mixture of hidden irrationality, silent improbability and a – seemingly – innocent banality creates the basic narrative embodied in the drawings of Laszlo Laszlo Revesz. The events, ore more precisely the memory of eventual events are neither spectacular, nor remarkable; the places are commonplaces, in the sense, that everybody can see and visit them, or at least, everybody had already seen completely similar places, so that neither the motives, nor the figures, nor their behavior and activity could appeal any interest, from the side of the audience." In all Révész's work from the very beginning he has built into the pictures a complexity of satire mixed with everyday symbolism that attracts and captures the viewer's attention. The editor in chief of Falter Austria Christian Zillner wrote a book about Révész work "Beyond modern and postmodern" in which he states: "One would assume that someone with Révész's history of reality and seriousness would look to art for a cheerful way out. But just the opposite turns out to be true: with an almost unsettling persistence, Révész reveals to us his "individual embodied memory" Since 2008 Révész has made zines in collaboration with the independent publisher Innen Zine based in Geneva, Switzerland.

== Exhibitions ==
During the years László László Révész has had many solo and group exhibitions. Examples:

=== Solo exhibitions (selection) ===
- 2016 Gulli Vera, Liget Galéria, Budapest, Hungary
- 2013 Gap stories, video screening at MUSA, Vienna, Austria
- 2009 'My Sky, My Sixties', Kiscelli Múzeum, Budapest, Hungary
- 2002 Poppies on the Palatinus, Ludwig Museum, Budapest, Hungary
- 1993 Tudomásulvétel, Kiállítási Csarnok-Műcsarnok, Budapest, Hungary

=== Group exhibition (selection) ===
- 2016 Intrigantes incertitudes, Muse des Art Moderne, Sant Etienne, France
- 2016 Meantime, Zwischenzeit, Eközben, Fuga, Budapest, Hungary
- 2013 TIME IS LOVE, 6 Sazmanab Platform for Contemporary Arts, Teheran, Iran
- 2012 10th Art Stays Festival - DISPLAY - Europe pavilion, ECC Maribor 2012, Ptuj, Slovenia
- 2011 OK.Video FLESH 5th Jakarta International Video Festival, Indonesia UnaVisita, Accademia Albertina di Belle Arti, Torino, Italy
- 2010 Fragile, The Daejeon Museum of Art, Daejon, South-Korea
- 2008 Central Europe Revisited II, Esterhazy Palace, Eisenstadt, Austria
- 2008 Micro Narratives, Musée d'Art Moderne, Saint-Etienne, France
- 2005 The Giving Person, Palazzo delleArti, Naples, ItalyConflict, Slought Foundation, Philadelphia, USA
- 2004 Brooklyn Euphoria, Volume, NYC, USA
- 2003 Aura, Millenáris, Budapest, Hungary
- 2002 Bildbetrachtung, H. Quinque-Wessels, Berlin, Germany
- 1996 The Butterfly Effect, SCCA Annual Exhibition, Műcsarnok, Budapest, Hungary
- 1992 24e Festival International de la Peinture, Chateau-Musee de Cagnes-Sur- Mer, France
- 1987 Dawn, documenta8, Kassel, Germany

== Works in collections ==
- Ludwig Museum, Budapest, Hungary; Title of the works: Körút I–II. (1992)
- Lentos Museum, Linz, Austria;
- Hungarian National Gallery, Budapest, Hungary;
- The Zine Collection at the London College of Communication Library, London, United Kingdom
- C3 Centre for Culture &Communication Foundation, Budapest, Hungary;
- Ludwig Museum, Budapest, Hungary; Singles' Terror (Night Monologue), video (2004)
- Ludwig Museum, Budapest, Hungary; Twice Around Eight, video (2005)
- István Csók Gallery, Székesfehérvár, Hungary;
- Munkácsy Museum, Békéscsaba, Hungary;
- Petőfi Literary Museum, Budapest, Hungary;
