= Gloria Friedmann =

German-French sculptor and installation artist

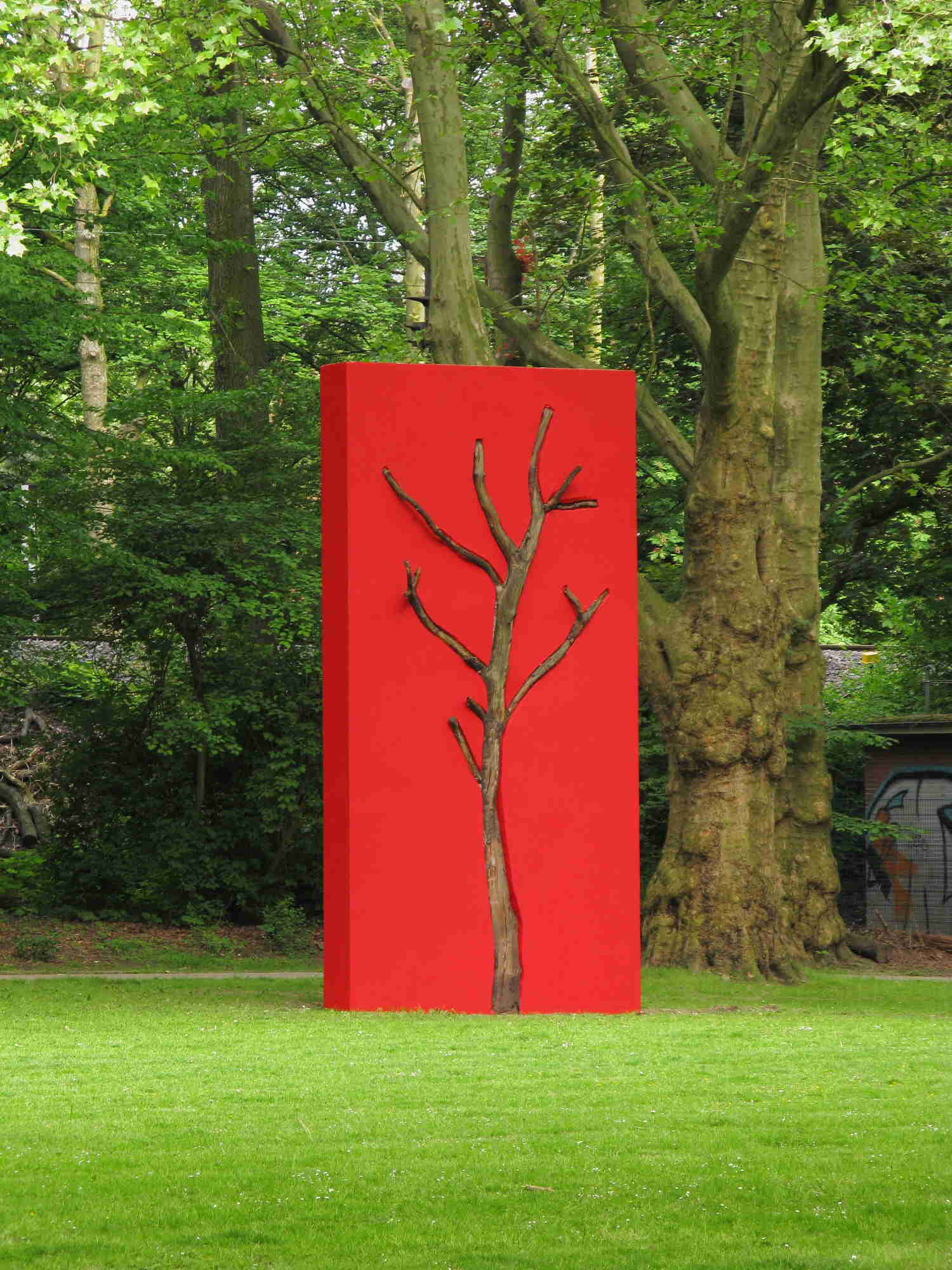
Denkmal / Monument (1990), dead tree - set into a concrete wall

Gloria Friedmann (born 1950 in Kronach) is a German-French sculptor, painter, photographer and installation artist. Friedmann participated in documenta 8.

== Biography ==
She was born in Kronach, Bavaria. In 1977, Friedmann moved to France. In the 1980s, she settled in Aignay-le-Duc (Côte-d'Or), where she lives and works. Since 1980, she has participated in numerous exhibitions in France, for example, at the Sélest'art biennale, in Alsace, in 1995, at the Maeght Foundation, in Saint-Paul-de-Vence, in 2013, and at the Musée de la Chasse et de la Nature, in Paris, in 2016.

She began to achieve recognition with her sculptures inspired by nature and animals. Subsequently, she embarked on the creation of monumental open-air sculptures. Friedmann is also a painter and photographer. She has a studio in Aignay-le-Duc, where she exhibits her paintings, sculptures, and photographs.

In 2018, she was appointed Knight of the Legion of Honour. She is married to the French artist Bertrand Lavier.

== Selected works ==
- Existentia (1987), documenta 8, Kassel
- Denkmal / Monument, dead tree - set into a concrete wall (1990), Essen, Germany
