= Tadashi Kawamata =

Japanese artist (born 1953)

- 川俣正
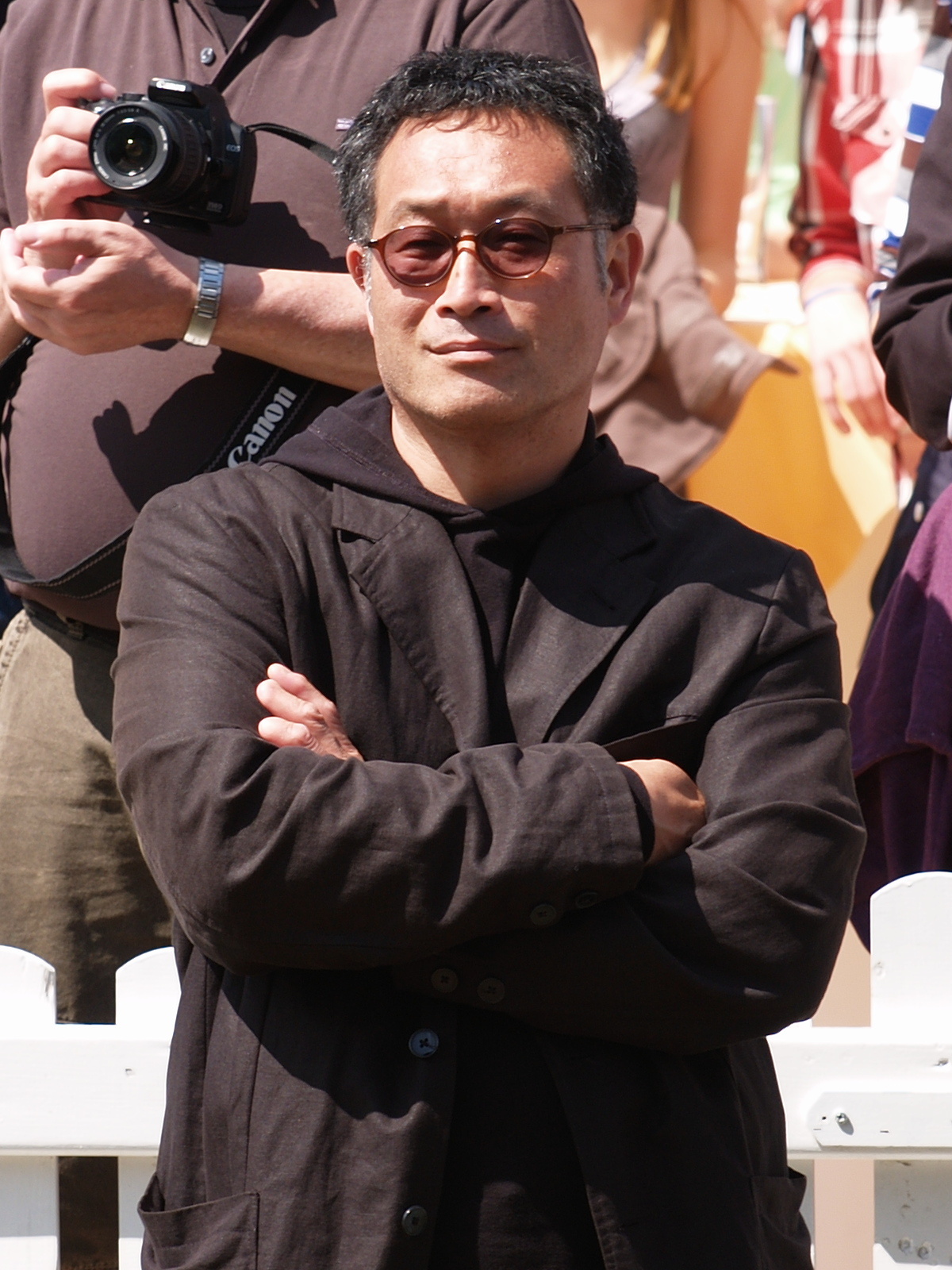
- Kawamata in 2010
- Born: July 24, 1953 (age 72); Mikasa, Hokkaido, Japan
- Known for: Contemporary art

Tadashi Kawamata (川俣正, Kawamata Tadashi, born July 24, 1953) is a Japanese installation artist. After first studying painting at Tokyo University of the Arts, Kawamata discovered his interest in the practice of installation. Using recuperated construction materials, like wood planks, he began building rudimentary partitions in gallery spaces and apartments to explore the perception of space.

Kawamata's fascination for Tokyo's urban landscape and its constant transformation soon led to the development of larger-scale installations in situ in cities in Japan and abroad. After having participated in the Venice Biennale in 1982 at only 28 years old, Kawamata's subsequent projects led him to work across Europe, North America, and South America.

These ephemeral installations raise questions about architecture and its permanence, and have drawn attention to social realities, such as the stark class difference apparent in large cities. Since the 2000s, the artist's installations have taken on an increasingly ecological charge, confronting environmental disasters, such as the accumulation of waste or the aftermath of the 2011 Tōhoku earthquake and tsunami.

He has lived and worked between Paris and Tokyo since 2006.

== Biography ==
Tadashi Kawamata was born in Mikasa, a mining town on the island of Hokkaido, and was raised in a rural, agricultural environment.

As an oil painting student at Tokyo University of the Arts, Kawamata read translations of works by French philosophers Maurice Merleau-Ponty, Jean-Paul Sartre, Michel Foucault, Michel Serres and Roland Barthes. The discovery of structuralist theory led the artist to begin considering art not as an object, but as a process of deconstruction and reconstruction, as well as an experience.

After developing his painting practice for three years, Kawamata states that one day he felt unable to continue:

I stared at the canvas, the frame around it. I thought about how that wooden frame supports a picture like, in a figurative sense, an exhibition does art. And I wondered whether this structure couldn't be an independent base for my work. I had no money, no studio, no particular technique, so I borrowed material and space.

Kawamata began his practice of installation in 1979, using lumber as his predominant material to intervene outside of traditional exhibition spaces. The practice of installation in non-traditional spaces dates back to the 1960s in Japan, when artists who couldn't afford to store their art or expose their works in rental galleries regularly organized exhibitions of transient nature. However, installation artists like Kawamata were also interested in the "physicality" (shintai-sei) of installations, and wished for spectators to be able to enter them. The artist stated in an interview that during his studies, he was passionate about the notion of space: "I wanted to know how an atmosphere emerges from certain spatial arrangements."

After receiving his BFA in 1979 and his MFA in 1981 from Tokyo University of the Arts, Kawamata had the opportunity to present his work for the first time in Europe. He was selected as one of three artists to present at the Japanese pavilion at the Venice Biennale in 1982, at 28 years old, and traveled around Europe for six months after the opening.

Kawamata settled in New York for two years during the 1980s. During this time, he developed a strong interest in graffiti artists and their clandestine and often anonymous practices that existed outside of the art market and museum systems.

The artist has lived a globe-trotting and somewhat nomadic lifestyle, working across Japan, the United States, Canada, South America, and Europe. He has lived part-time in Tokyo and part-time in France since 2006 and teaches at the École Nationale Supérieure des Beaux-Arts in Paris.

== Installation Work : 1979 - Today ==
Kawamata has said that it's possible to consider all of his installations as a single artwork:

I construct, I deconstruct, I construct, I deconstruct, I construct... It's like a flower. The flower grows, blooms and wilts, and the next year it blooms again. It's a continuous ensemble, which exists in multiple sites, in Europe, in Japan, in America. Sometimes it blooms here, sometimes over there.... The scale may be different, the material... It's a continuous project, which follows the same idea, the same concept, but the place is different, different people come to help me, the organization is different, each time the experience is different. But at the same time it's always the same thing.

The artist has also been consistent in privileging the use of ordinary materials, notably recovered wood used for industrial construction projects. Kawamata insists on its accessibility and affordability in every part of the world he has worked in.

Another defining element of Kawamata's practice is its collective nature. The artist depends on the help of others for the realization of many of his works, especially those on a larger scale. He says that he appreciates developing his ideas with others, whether they be students, carpenters, architects, engineers, or anyone else that may be open to making suggestions. The artist has organized "workshops" to develop projects collectively, like in 2008 at the Ecole nationale supérieure d'architecture de Versailles, when he worked with 150 students to create the installation Gandamaison.

In spite of the architectural nature of Kawamata's installations, he has stated that he has "no understanding of architecture". He has, however, collaborated with architects to realize his large-scale installation works. While the artist does use preliminary sketches and drawings, he affirms that it is impossible to know what the installation will look like upon completion as the installation only takes its final shape during the process of construction.

=== Early installations ===
Kawamata's first three-dimensional installations were simple wooden partitions that allowed him to restructure interiors, like Measure Scene 2, presented in 1979. Kawamata built a temporary wall that divided the gallery space, with the intention of rendering visitors conscious of the room they were in. Art historian Mouna Mekouar likens these partitions to shōji doors, an important element in traditional Japanese architecture.

That same year, the installation By Land led the artist to intervene outdoors. Kawamata found himself captivated by a strip of empty land on the Tama riverside that he would glimpse briefly as he rode by on the train. He referred to it as a "no man's land", far from any human habitation, and, due to its proximity to the river, sometimes underwater. Kawamata used recycled construction materials to build a rudimentary wooden structure there, without getting permission to do so. By Land remained in place for three days, before it was discovered by authorities and taken down.

Apart from By Land, Kawamata's early installations remained confined to interior spaces. In the early 1980s, Kawamata built installations in empty apartments for rent. For Takara House Room 205, the artist installed wooden panels in a standard 10m^{2} apartment in Tokyo. The horizontal panels divided the space into different modules and filtered the apartment's natural light. Kawamata then invited twenty visitors to enter the space, using a provided map to move through the freshly-imagined apartment.

=== Construction site projects ===
As a student in 1970s Tokyo, Kawamata was fascinated by the constant transformations of the city and its apparent impermanence. He recounts seeing from his apartment window a building methodologically deconstructed, disappearing to be replaced only a few months later by another: "I had witnessed from my window an operation of urban metabolism, a digestion/regurgitation of materials which seemed connected to the city's life cycle."

Additionally, during his student years, Kawamata admired American artist Gordon Matta-Clark. As opposed to land artists, who intervened in wide-open, natural open spaces, Matta-Clark's large-scale architectural interventions were conceived for the overdeveloped, densely packed cityscape and all of its turbulent action.

When Kawamata works within the city, his installations appear at first in the urban landscape like any other construction zone. However, the initially banal sight soon transforms. This metamorphosis was aptly described by Documenta 8 director Manfred Schneckenburger, who invited Kawamata to participate in the 1987 edition of the renowned recurring exhibition. Kawamata decided to build an installation in and around a church in Kassel that had been bombed during the war and which remained abandoned when the city center was reconstructed:

What was...astounding was the mastery with which Kawamata let this chaotic mass grow first into a filigree scaffold, then into the more compact casing, and then into the thousandfold complex of gesticulations, dynamically breaking out and thrusting high against the ruin. Exact planning and bustling development were one in a scarcely imaginable way. The hackneyed phrase about organic construction acquired a meaning of its own.

Upon completion, the bombed-out church appeared to be cradled by Kawamata's precarious gathering of planks, embodying fragility and determined strength all at once. Writer Yvette Biro recounts her experience of visiting the site:

On the one hand, we had the impression of witnessing a normal construction process...on the other hand, inside the space we found an unexpected peaceful zone. The silence and the energy of the action collided and - much more - supported each other, lending a sense of liveliness, the illusion of dynamic existence to these odd ruins.

Art historian Mouna Mekouar argues that Kawamata "does not seek to define a form, to erect an architecture, or to close off a space; on the contrary, he tears down the foundations of Architectonics and interferes in the interstices so as to dig passages, to recycle time."

Installations similar to Destroyed Church, building upon sites within the cityscape, were realized by Kawamata in the Hague (1986), Toronto (1989), Grenoble (1987) and in São Paulo for the 19th São Paulo International Biennale (1987).

=== Field works and Favelas ===
In parallel to his large-scale installations, Kawamata created numerous structures on a humbler scale. His Field works are structures of cardboard and plywood, loosely held together with nails or tape, intended to fall apart as time passes. The Field works are intended to bear a strong resemblance to the temporary, transitory shelters of the homeless in cities around the world, drawing attention to otherwise unnoticed architectures. Kawamata has left behind Field works in cities such as Tokyo, Chicago, New York and Montreal.

In São Paulo and Rio de Janeiro, Kawamata was struck by the prevalence of favelas, shanty towns that sprawled across the city. "Near the hotel where I was staying, right close to the favelas, the police arrived and destroyed everything. A week later, the people had started to rebuild it. It's like a natural cycle...destroying, throwing away, rebuilding. It's a non-site situation, a situation of non-history."

In 1991, Kawamata erected his own Favela in Houston. About twenty fragile plywood shacks were built on the riverbank, against the backdrop of the gleaming Houston skyline. Art historian Mouna Mekouar argues that Kawamata's installation reveals "social disparity, the brutal cleavage between the rich and the poor". Kawamata's Favelas act as "visual terrorism", disturbing the homogeneity of the landscape. He built other Favelas that same year in Ottawa and in Ushimado.

=== Recent installations ===
The accumulation of objects has become a prevalent theme in the artist's work since the mid-2000s and has taken on an increasingly ecological charge.

Kawamata's 2011 installation, Under the Water, was a reaction to the 2011 Tōhoku earthquake and tsunami. First exhibited at the galerie kamel mennour in 2011 and later at the Centre Pompidou-Metz, the artist installed a formless layer of debris that appeared to float above the gallery floor. Kawamata described his inspiration:

I wanted to create a sense of pressure that would be palpable from the outset... several thousand people were never found after the disaster, so there are dead people in the sea. I imagined those people under the water looking upwards after the tsunami. They would have seen this sea of debris. This installation was inspired by that.

In 2018, Kawamata revisited this configuration with the presentation of Over Flow at MAAT Lisbon. The creation of the work involved the collecting of debris across different Portuguese beaches and in the city of Almada, followed by its careful sorting. A workshop was then organized with the artist to design the installation. The result was a layer of colorful garbage - fishing rope, plastic, ropes, bottles, utensils, electrical appliances - that hung above visitors' heads.

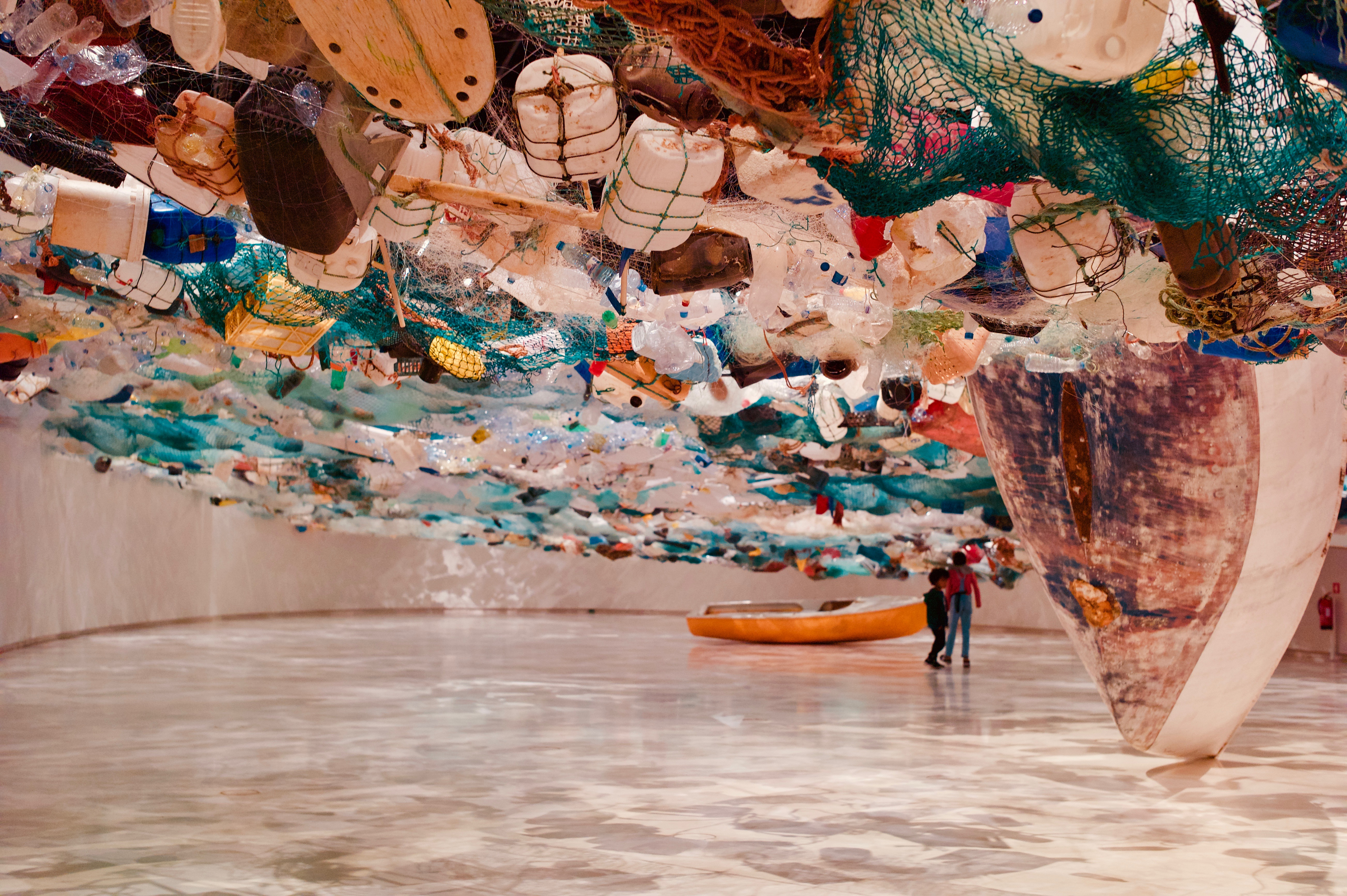
Installation view of Over Flow at MAAT Lisbon, 2018

Since 2008, Kawamata has also constructed Tree Huts, somewhat whimsical structures sometimes resembling birds' nests, sometimes resembling rudimentary tree houses. Kawamata has exposed these structures within gallery spaces, but also in the public sphere. Rugged, asymmetrical and crude in construction, they appear to sprout organically from the city's architecture like parasites. Art historian Caroline Cros suggests that these interventions are meant to remind the viewer that "architecture is not the privilege of humans alone", noting importantly that, like Kawamata, "animals and plants are magnificent architects that work collectively".

== Gallery ==
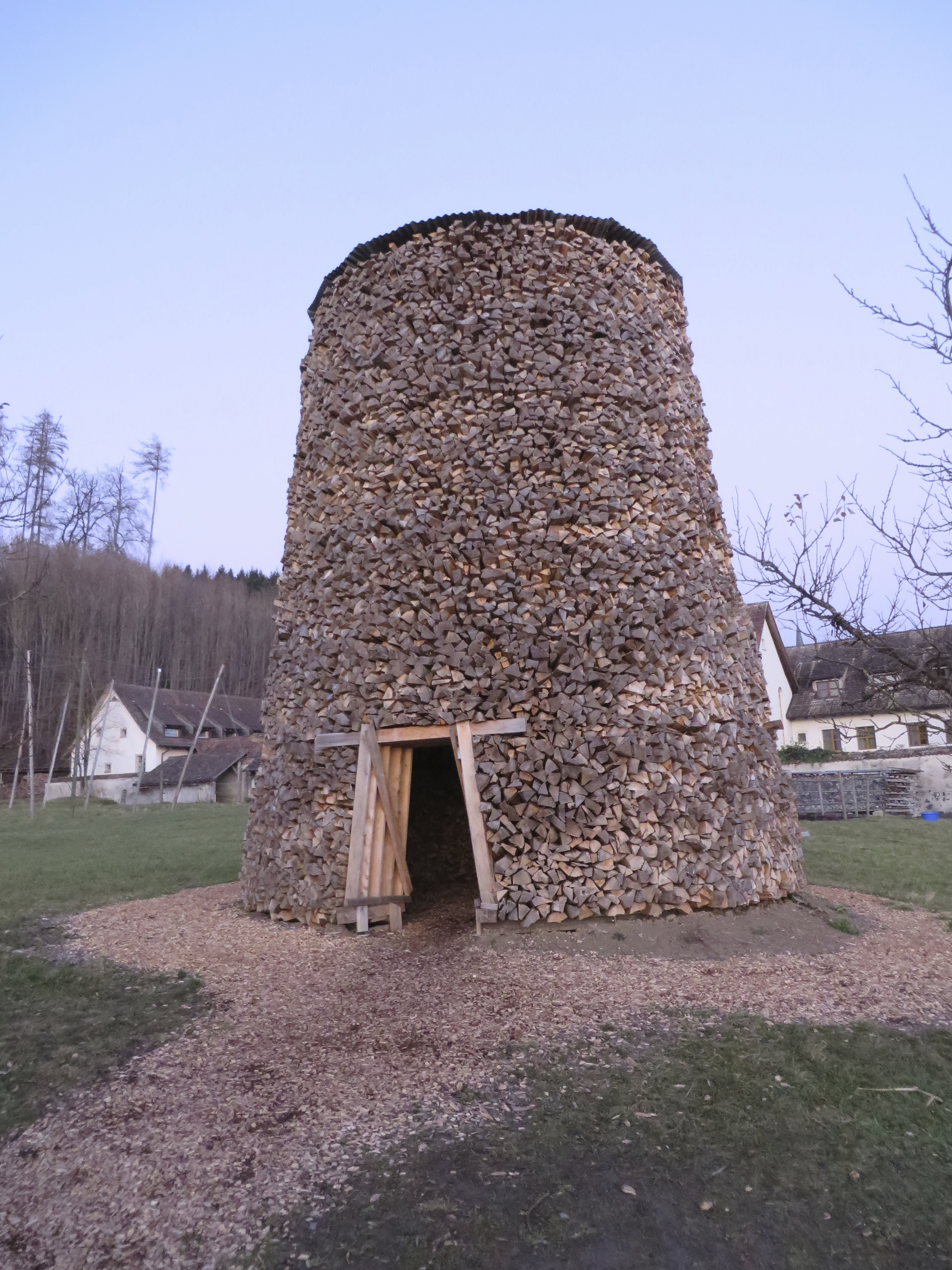
Scheiterturm ("tower") at the Kunstmuseum Thurgau, Warth-Weiningen, Switzerland

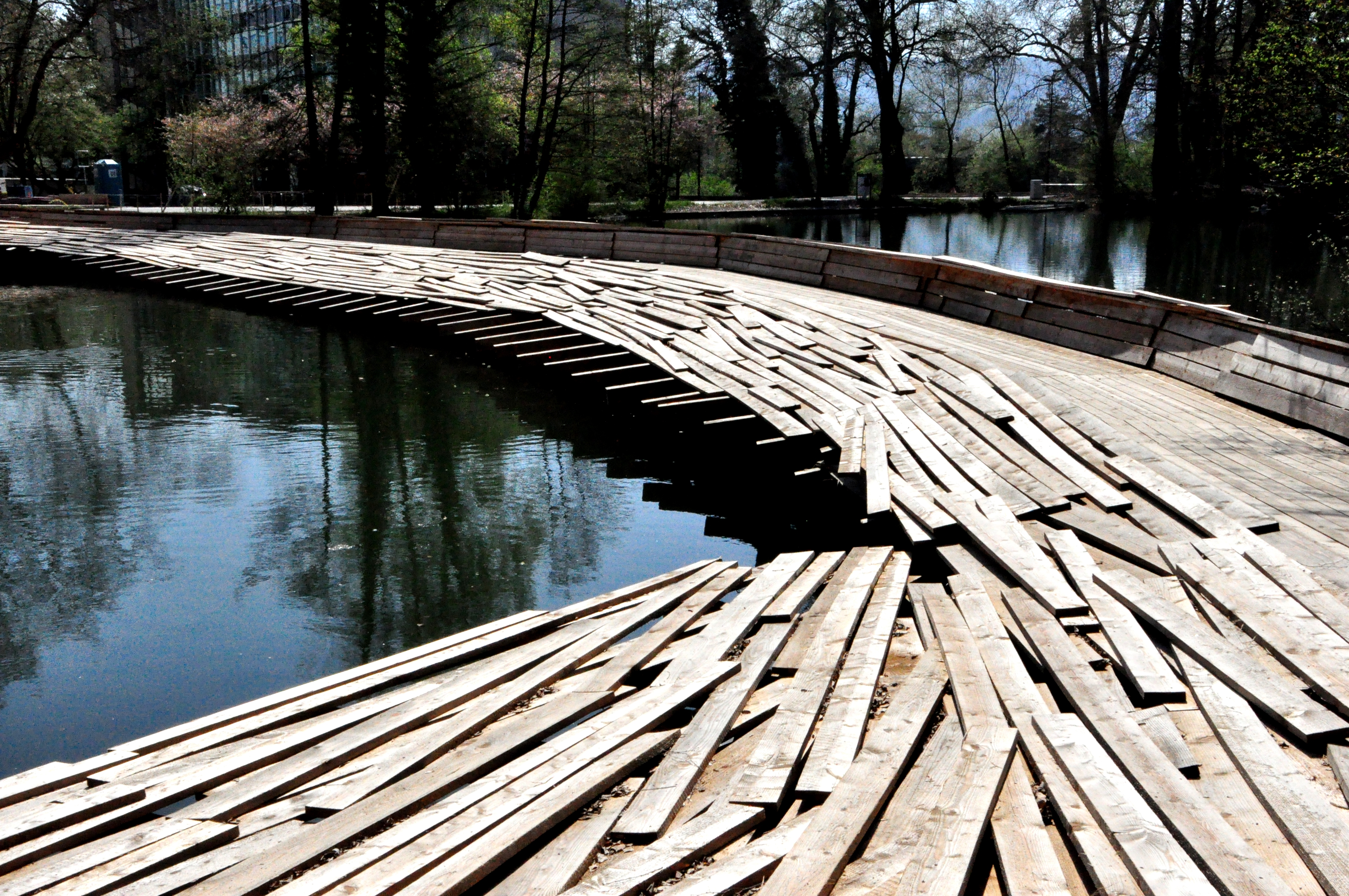
Steg ("step") at the Zellweger Weiher Uster, Uster, Switzerland

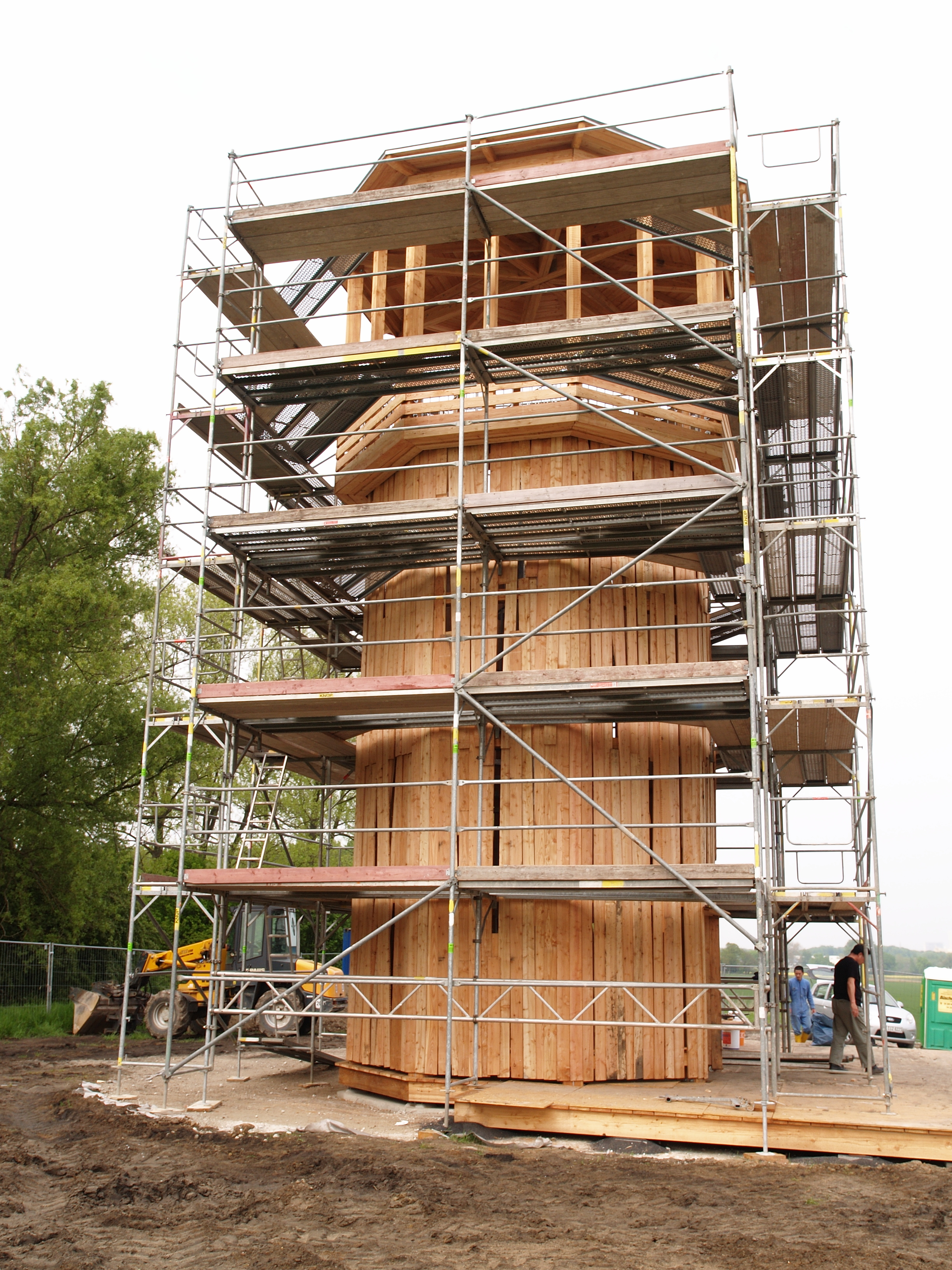
Kawamata (right corner) working at the Walkway and Tower, Recklinghausen Germany
