= Manfred Schneckenburger =

German art historian (1938–2019)

- Born: 1 December 1938; Stuttgart, Germany
- Died: 2 December 2019 (aged 81); Cologne, Germany
- Occupations: Art historian, curator

Manfred Schneckenburger (1 December 1938 – 2 December 2019) was a German art historian and curator of modern and contemporary art. He was the curator of the documenta art exhibition twice, documenta 6 in 1977 and documenta 8 in 1987. He was the only person outside of the exhibition’s founder, Arnold Bode to have led documenta twice.

He was the director of the Kunsthalle Köln from 1973 to 1974. He served as rector of the Kunstakademie Münster.

== Life and work ==
=== Early years ===
Manfred Schneckenburger was born 1 December 1938 in Stuttgart, Germany.

Schneckenburger studied German literature, history, and the history of art. He first worked as a school teacher for some years and later as an art critic. In 1972, he organized the cultural program for the Olympic Games in Munich. From 1973 to 1974, he was the director of the Kunsthalle Cologne.

=== Curator of the documenta ===
As an artistic director, Schneckenburger curated the documenta in Kassel twice, in 1977 and 1987. In curating the documenta 6, he "decided to review definitions of media. Unlike in the past, we thought in terms of media, not in terms of genres," Schneckenburger said. "Photography was not yet considered art, and neither was video, which was commonly confused with television. Visitors to documenta 6 could view these media in all their artistic potential, emancipated and on an equal footing. We even examined books as a medium. This was a totally different approach, reviewed and brought up to date for 1977." In 1987, documenta 8 did not perform such a review. "Instead, we tried to use a new social engagement in art as our selection criteria. Usable art, social design, whatever addressed itself to people and expanded the social dimension was to be our yardstick. Hence the subtitle, 'The Social Dimension of Art'."

According to Richard Cork, Schneckenburger was of the opinion that " 'In the late '80s' ... there are no new strategies, but rather new combinations', and he has attempted to concentrate on artists who move in their work 'from the individual to the social'."

=== Professor at the Kunstakademie Münster ===
In 1990, Schneckenburger was appointed "Professor für Kunst und Öffentlichkeit" and in 1995 Rector of the Kunstakademie Münster, where his exhibition cycle, "In westfälischen Schlössern" (1992), created a furore and where he retired in 2004.

Manfred Schneckenburger died in the Heart Center of the University of Cologne on 2 December 2019 at the age of 81.

== Select publications ==
- Das Bildformat: Geschichte und Künstleriche Bedeutung vom Mittelalter bis zum Rokoko. PhD dissertation, 1973.
- Schätze aus Ecuador. Exh. cat. Kunsthalle Cologne, 1974.
- Dan Flavin: Drei Installationen in fluoreszierendem Licht. Exh. cat. Kunsthalle Cologne, 1974.
- Ernst Barlach: Plastik, Zeichnungen, Druckgraphik. Exh. cat. Kunsthalle Cologne, 1975.
- 1881, 1981: Kulturgeschichte in 2 Jahren. Van Laack Schmitz & Eltschig, 1982.
- documenta - Idee und Institution: Tendenzen, Konzepte, Materialien. Munich 1983, ISBN 3-7654-1902-8
- Heinz-Günter Prager: Skulpturen: Museum moderner Kunst. Palais Liechtenstein, Vienna, 1983.
- Deutsche Bildhauer der Gegenwart. Kunstverein Augsburg, 1983.
- Der letzte Aufbruch der Moderne: Kunst der Gegenwart. Propyläen Verlag, 1984.
- Kleinplastik: Bundesrepublik Deutschland, Frankreich, Ungarn: 3. Triennale Fellbach. Fellbach, 1986.
- (with Gabriele Lueg), Hans Salentin. Wienand, 1990.
- Rainer Splitt: Plastik, die ein Treppenhaus und sich selber definiert. Niedersächsisches Ministerium für Wissenschaft und Kultur, 1993.
- Aushäusig: Kunst für öffentliche Räume. Lindinger und Schmid, 1994.
- Kunst des 20. Jahrhunderts, 2 volumes, Benedikt Taschen Verlag, Cologne, 2000.
- (with Jutta Laurinat), Victoria Bell: Space Engines. Exh. cat. Flottmann-Hallen, Herne, 2003.
- (with Klaus Honnef and Christiane Fricke), Art of the 20th Century: Sculpture, new media, photography, 2 vols., Benedikt Taschen, Cologne, 2005.
- 2. Projektions-Biennale Bad Rothenfelde. Kettler, 2010.
