= Christine Brodbeck =

Swiss dancer and Muslim writer

Rabia Christine Brodbeck (born Christine Brodbeck; 28 July 1950) is a Swiss dancer and author. She had an international career as a modern dancer. Since her conversion to Islam in 1986 she has written two spiritual books.

== Biography ==
Brodbeck was born on 28 July 1950 in Basel, Switzerland. She trained in classical ballet and modern dance in London.

Brodbeck converted to Islam and became a practitioner of Sufism, a form of Islamic mysticism, in 1986 after visiting a mosque in New York City. In 1987 she was a performer at the contemporary art exhibition documenta 8 in Kassel. In October 1990 she performed at the Annual Swiss Dance Festival in New York City, presented by Danspace Project and the Swiss Institute Contemporary Art New York. She retired from dancing in 1998.

She has authored two Islamic spirituality books, From the Stage to the Prayer Mat in 2012 and The Longing of the Soul in 2014.

Brodbeck lives in Istanbul and works as a dance teacher there.
