= Documenta =

Contemporary art exhibition in Kassel, Germany

Coordinates: 51°18′49″N 9°29′51″E

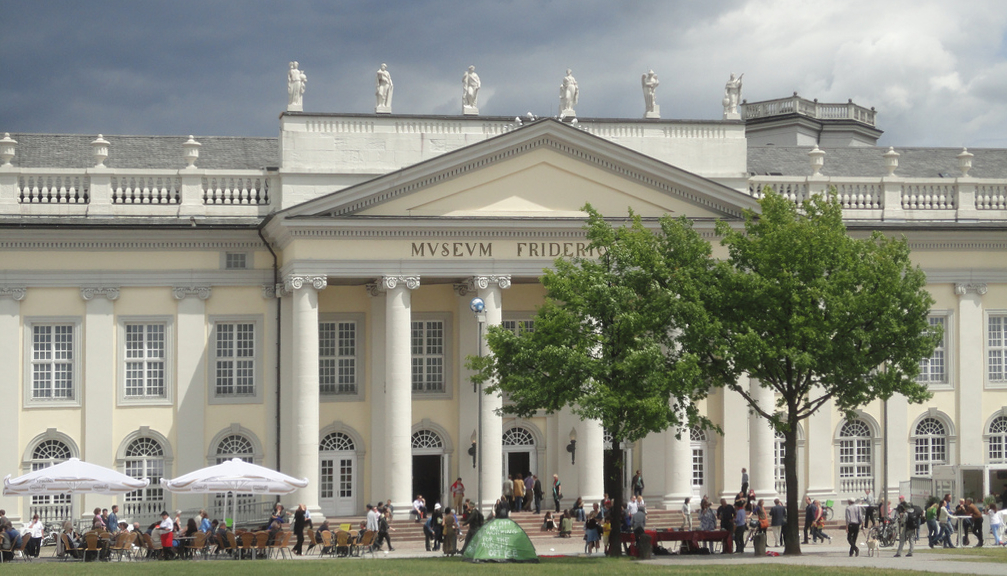
The Fridericianum during documenta (13)

Documenta (stylized in lowercase as: documenta) is an exhibition of contemporary art which takes place every five years in Kassel, Germany.

documenta was founded by artist, teacher and curator Arnold Bode in 1955 as part of the Bundesgartenschau (Federal Horticultural Show) which took place in Kassel at that time. It was an attempt to bring Germany up to speed with modern art, both banishing and repressing the cultural darkness of Nazism. This first documenta featured many European artists who are generally considered to have had a significant influence on modern art (such as Picasso and Kandinsky). The more recent editions of the event feature artists based across the world, but much of the art is site-specific.

Every documenta is limited to 100 days of exhibition, which is why it is often referred to as the "museum of 100 days". documenta is not a selling exhibition.

== Etymology ==
documenta, an invented word, reflects the intention of the exhibition (in particular of the first documenta in 1955) to be a documentation of modern art which was not available for the German public during the Nazi era. Rumour spread from those close to Arnold Bode that it was relevant for the coinage of the term that the Latin word documentum could be separated into docere 'teach' and mens 'intellect', and therefore thought it to be a good word to describe the intention and the demand of documenta.

Each edition of documenta has commissioned its own visual identity, most of which have conformed to the typographic style of solely using lowercase letters, which originated at the Bauhaus.

== History ==
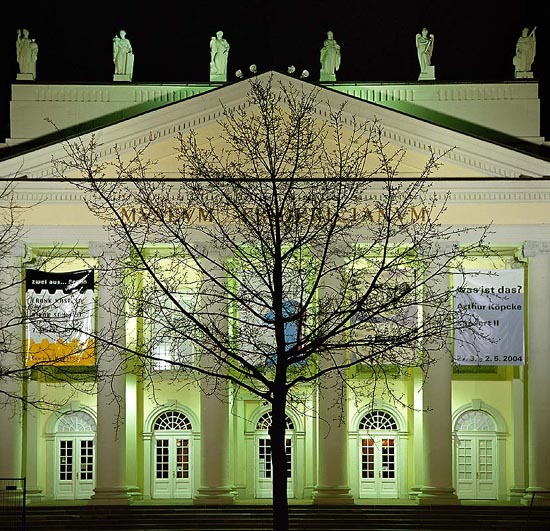
Stadtverwaldung by Joseph Beuys, oaktree in front of the museum Fridericianum, documenta 7

Art professor and designer Arnold Bode from Kassel was the initiator of the first documenta. Originally planned as a secondary event to accompany the Bundesgartenschau, this attracted more than 130,000 visitors in 1955. The exhibition centred less on "contemporary art"—that is, art made after 1945—instead, Bode wanted to show the public works which had been known as "Entartete Kunst" in Germany during the Nazi era: Fauvism, Expressionism, Cubism, Blauer Reiter, Futurism and Pittura Metafisica. Therefore, abstract art, in particular the abstract paintings of the 1920s and 1930s, was the focus of interest in this exhibition.

Over time, the focus shifted to contemporary art. At first, the show was limited to works from Europe, but soon covered works by artists from the Americas, Africa and Asia. In 1972, 4. documenta, the first ever to turn a profit, featured a selection of pop art, minimal art and kinetic art. Adopting the theme of Questioning Reality – Pictorial Worlds Today, the 1972 documenta radically redefined what could be considered art by featuring minimal and conceptual art, marking a turning point in the public acceptance of those styles. Also, it devoted a large section to the work of Adolf Wolfli, the great Swiss outsider, then unknown. Joseph Beuys performed repeatedly under the auspices of his utopian Organization for Direct Democracy. Additionally, the 1987 documenta show signaled another important shift with the elevation of design to the realm of art – showing an openness to postmodern design. Certain key political dates for wide-reaching social and cultural upheavals, such as 1945, 1968 or 1976/1977, became chronological markers of documenta X (1997), along which art's political, social, cultural and aesthetic exploratory functions were traced. documenta11 was organized around themes like migration, urbanization and the post-colonial experience, with documentary photography, film and video as well as works from far-flung locales holding the spotlight. In 2012, documenta (13) was described as "ardently feminist, global and multimedia in approach and including works by dead artists and selected bits of ancient art".

== Criticism ==
documenta typically gives its artists at least two years to conceive and produce their projects, so the works are often elaborate and intellectually complex. However, the participants are often not publicised before the very opening of the exhibition. At documenta (13), the official list of artists was not released until the day the show opened.

documenta's decision to feature some of its shows outside of Germany, in peripheral contexts has sparked numerous critical discussions that reached an apogee around documenta14, which partly took place in Athens, Greece, in 2017. Various critics raised concerns about the ways in which the institution's endorsement of Athens as a place of resistance and novelty entailed a patronizing Orientalist stance, linked to new forms of tourism and the enjoyment of underdeveloped sites of "crisis".

In 2022, documenta was involved in three separate controversies: one revolving around the banner People's Justice (2002) by the Indonesian collective Taring Padi that contained imagery decried as antisemitic; another on the inclusion of the Palestinian collective Question of Funding in the exhibition; and, lastly, the inclusion of a 1988 Palestinian liberation movement brochure by Burhan Karkoutly titled Presence des Femmes. Artist Hito Steyerl pulled her work from the exhibition in protest to the first two instances, with managing director Sabine Schormann's departure as a consequence. In response to the controversy spurred by Presence des Femmes, documenta released a statement urging the artistic team to remove the drawings until they can be "appropriately contextualized"; scholars from the Archives of Women’s Struggles in Algeria stated: "[Presence des Femmes] was in solidarity by the Algerian women with the Palestinian people, in denouncing the crimes committed by the Israeli State. We would like this document, like many other texts or artworks in the world, to be placed in its historical and political context."

In November 2023, documenta received the resignation letter of the remaining curators María Inés Rodríguez, Simon Njami, Gong Yan and Kathrin Rhomberg, following the resignation of Bracha L. Ettinger and Ranjit Hoskote. The letter stated: "In the current circumstances we do not believe that there is a space in Germany for an open exchange of ideas and the development of complex and nuanced artistic approaches that documenta artists and curators deserve."

Following the controversy, documenta announced in November 2024 that Naomi Beckwith, Deputy Director and Chief Curator of the Solomon R. Guggenheim Museum, had been selected as the curator for the sixteenth edition.

== Directors ==
The first four documentas, organized by Arnold Bode, established the exhibition's international credentials. Since the fifth documenta (1972), a new artistic director has been named for each documenta exhibition by a committee of experts. documenta 8 was put together in two years instead of the usual five. The original directors, Edy de Wilde and Harald Szeemann, were unable to get along and stepped down. They were replaced by Manfred Schneckenburger, Edward F. Fry, Wulf Herzogenrath, Armin Zweite and Vittorio Fagone. Coosje van Bruggen helped select artists for documenta 7, the 1982 edition. documenta IX's team of curators consisted of Jan Hoet, Piero Luigi Tazzi, Denys Zacharopoulos and Bart de Baere. For documenta X Catherine David was chosen as the first woman and the first non-German speaker to hold the post. It is also the first and unique time that its website documenta x was conceived by a curator (swiss curator Simon Lamunière) as a part of the exhibition. The first non-European director was Okwui Enwezor for documenta11.

2012's edition was organized around a central node, the trans-Atlantic melding of two distinct individuals who first encountered each other in the "money-soaked deserts of the United Arab Emirates". As an organizing principle it is simultaneously a commentary on the romantic potentials of globalization and also a critique of how digital platforms can complicate or interrogate the nature of such relationships. Curatorial agents refer to the concept as possessing a "fricative potential for productive awkwardness," wherein a twosome is formed for the purposes of future exploration.

The salary for the artistic director of Documenta is around €100,000 a year.

Title	Date	Director	Exhibitors	Exhibits	Visitors
documenta	16 July – 18 September 1955	Arnold Bode	148	670	130,000
II. documenta	11 July – 11 October 1959	Arnold Bode, Werner Haftmann	338	1770	134,000
documenta III	27 June – 5 October 1964	Arnold Bode, Werner Haftmann	361	1450	200,000
4. documenta	27 June – 6 October 1968	24-strong documenta council	151	1000	220,000
documenta 5	30 June – 8 October 1972	Harald Szeemann	218	820	228,621
documenta 6	24 June – 2 October 1977	Manfred Schneckenburger	622	2700	343,410
documenta 7	19 June – 28 September 1982	Rudi Fuchs	182	1000	378,691
documenta 8	12 June – 20 September 1987	Manfred Schneckenburger	150	600	474,417
documenta IX	12 June – 20 September 1992	Jan Hoet	189	1000	603,456
documenta X	21 June – 28 September 1997	Catherine David	120	700	628,776
documenta11	8 June – 15 September 2002	Okwui Enwezor	118	450	650,924
documenta 12	16 June – 23 September 2007	Roger M. Buergel/Ruth Noack	114	over 500	754,301
documenta (13)	9 June – 16 September 2012	Carolyn Christov-Bakargiev	187		904,992
documenta 14	8 April – 16 July 2017 in Athens, Greece; 10 June – 17 September 2017 in Kassel	Adam Szymczyk	more than 160	1500	339,000 in Athens; 891,500 in Kassel
documenta fifteen	18 June 2022 – 25 September 2022 in Kassel	ruangrupa	more than 67		738,000
documenta 16	12 June 2027 – 29 September 2027	Naomi Beckwith			

== Venues ==
documenta is held in different venues in Kassel. Since 1955, the fixed venue has been the Fridericianum. The documenta-Halle was built in 1992 for documenta IX and now houses some of the exhibitions. Other venues used for documenta have included the Karlsaue park, Schloss Wilhelmshöhe, the Neue Galerie, the Ottoneum and the Kulturzentrum Schlachthof. Though Okwui Enezor notably tried to subvert the euro-centric approach documenta had taken, he instigated a series of five platforms before the documenta11 in Vienna, Berlin, New Delhi, St Lucia and Lagos, in an attempt to take Documenta into a new post-colonial, borderless space, from which experimental cultures could emerge. documenta 12 occupied five locations, including the Fridericianum, the Wilhelmshöhe castle park and the specially constructed "Aue-Pavillon", or meadow pavilion, designed by French firm Lacaton et Vassal. At documenta (13) in 2012 about a fifth of the works were unveiled in places like Kabul, Afghanistan and Banff, Canada.

There are also a number of works that are usually presented outside, most notably in Friedrichsplatz, in front of the Fridericianum and the Karlsaue park. To handle the number of artworks at documenta IX, five connected temporary "trailers" in glass and corrugated metal were built in the Karlsaue. For documenta (13), French architects Anne Lacaton and Jean-Philippe Vassal constructed the temporary "Aue-Pavillon" in the park.

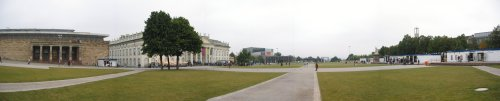
View of the Friedrichsplatz with the Fridericianum (2nd Building from the left) and the Documenta ticket booth (right)

== Permanent installations ==
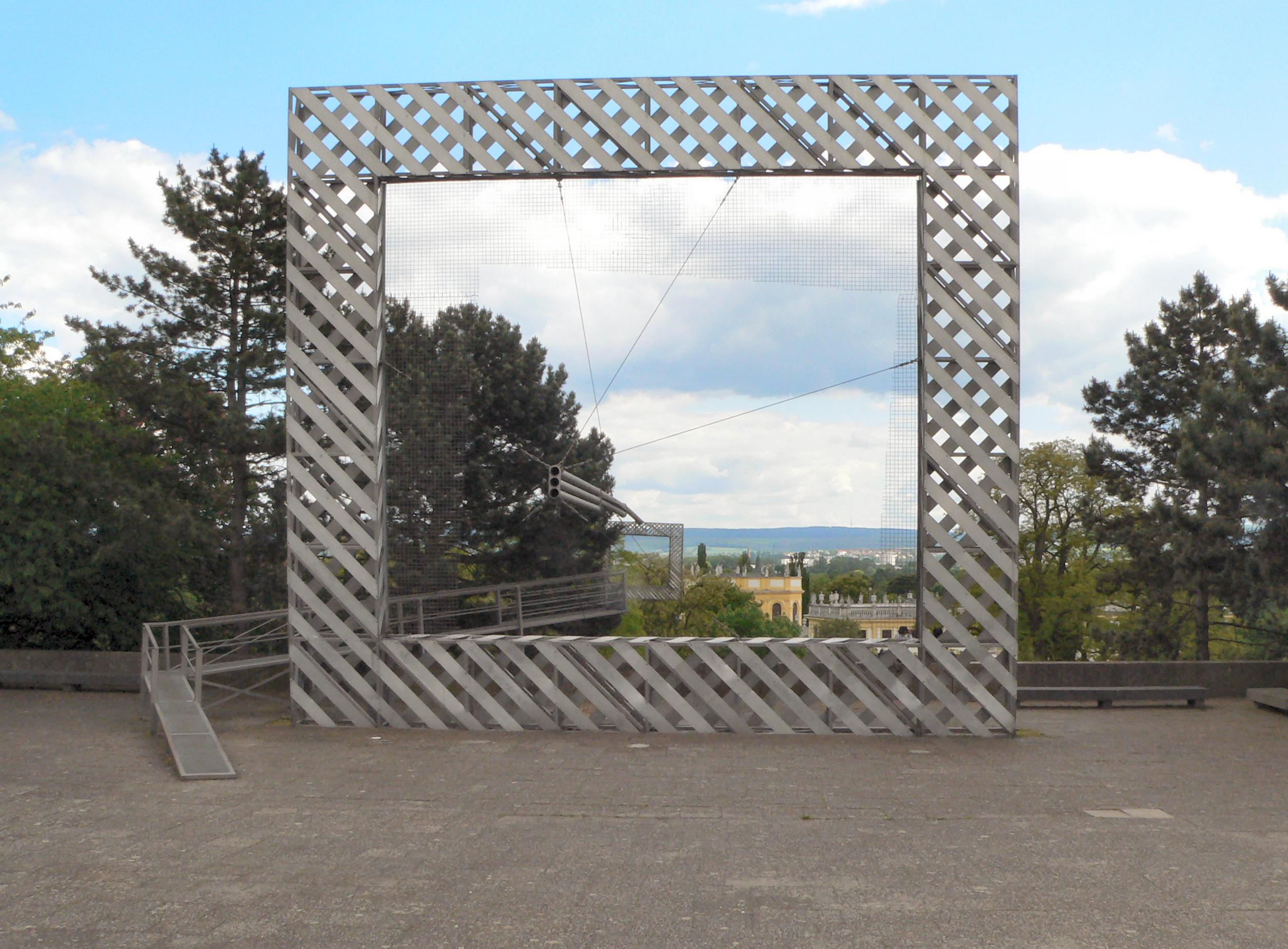
Rahmenbau (1977) by Haus Rucker und Co.

A few of the works exhibited at various documentas remained as purchases in Kassel museums. They include 7000 Eichen by Joseph Beuys; Rahmenbau (1977) by Haus-Rucker-Co; Laserscape Kassel (1977) by Horst H. Baumann; Traumschiff Tante Olga (1977) by Anatol Herzfeld; Vertikaler Erdkilometer by Walter De Maria; Spitzhacke (1982) by Claes Oldenburg; Man walking to the sky (1992) by Jonathan Borofsky; and Fremde (1992) by Thomas Schütte (one part of the sculptures are installed on Rotes Palais at Friedrichsplatz, the other on the roof of the Concert Hall in Lübeck).

== documenta archive ==
The extensive volume of material that is regularly generated on the occasion of this exhibition prompted Arnold Bode to create an archive in 1961. The heart of the archive’s collection comes from the files and materials of the documenta organization. A continually expanding video and image archive is also part of the collection as are the independently organized bequests of Arnold Bode and artist Harry Kramer.

== Management ==
=== Visitors ===
In 1992, on the occasion of documenta IX, for the first time in the history of documenta, more than half a million people traveled to Kassel. The 2002 edition of documenta attracted 650,000 visitors, more than triple Kassel's population. In 2007, documenta 12 drew 754,000 paying visitors, with more than one-third of the visitors coming from abroad and guests from neighboring Netherlands, France, Belgium and Austria among the most numerous. In 2012, documenta (13) had 904,992 visitors.

=== Budget ===
In 2007, half of documenta's budget of 19 million euros ($25.7 million) came from the city of Kassel, the state of Hessen and Germany's Kulturstiftung des Bundes. The rest came from sponsors, donors and ticket sales.

documenta 14’s budget was at 37 million euros ($40 million), spread between 2013 and 2018; by the end of 2017, its deficit was expected to reach 5.4 million euros. Overspending in Athens led to a liquidity shortfall of 7 million euros, forcing the shareholders of documenta — the city of Kassel and the German state of Hesse — to step in with emergency loan guarantees worth 8 million euros.
