= Wulf Herzogenrath =

German art historian and curator (1944–2026)

- Herzogenrath in 2016
- Born: 23 March 1944; Rathenow, Gau March of Brandenburg, Germany
- Died: 18 June 2026 (aged 82); Berlin
- Occupations: Art historian; Curator
- Organizations: Hamburger Bahnhof; Kunsthalle Bremen

Wulf Herzogenrath (23 March 1944 – 18 June 2026) was a German art historian and art curator. He was a leading expert in the fields of Video Art, New Media Art, and the Bauhaus.

== Life and career ==
Herzogenrath was born in Rathenow on 23 March 1944. He studied art history and ethnology in Kiel, Berlin, and Bonn. From 1967 to 1968 he edited the exhibition catalog "50 Jahre Bauhaus". He received his doctorate in 1970 with a thesis on Oskar Schlemmer's murals.

In 1973 the 28-year-old Herzogenrath was hired to be director of a Kunstverein (art society) in Cologne.

From 1989 he was the chief curator of the National Gallery in Berlin, entrusted with the Hamburger Bahnhof division for contemporary art. Herzogenrath left in 1994 to lead the Kunsthalle Bremen until his retirement in 2011. He relocated to Berlin in 2012.

From 2012 on, he was the director of the visual arts section of the German Academy of Arts, Berlin. He assembled a large collection of artist's books.

Herzogenrath died in Berlin on 18 June 2026, at the age of 82.

== Curatorial work ==
- In 1976 Herzogenrath organized the first European one man show of Nam June Paik at the Kölnischer Kunstverein.
- Ex Machina – Frühe Computergrafik bis 1979
- He established and curated the new video section of Documenta 6 (1977) that included Nam June Paik and Wolf Vostell.
- He was part of the documenta 8 (1987) curatorial team, specializing in new technology.
- He initiated in 2006 40YEARSVIDEOART.DE: Digital Heritage: Video art in Germany from 1963 to the present, a collection of video art works from 1963 to 2006 that was shown simultaneously in five German museums with a DVD set documenting the exhibition.
- Die fremde Hand. Computergenerierte Zeichnungen von Wolfgang Zach

== Honours ==
- Herzogenrath was awarded the Bremer Medaille für Kunst und Wissenschaft.

== Publications ==
- 50 jahre bauhaus. Württembergischer Kunstverein, 1968.
- with Johann-Karl Schmidt (Hrsg.): Dix. Zum 100. Geburtstag 1891–1991. Cantz, Stuttgart 1992, ISBN 978-3-7757-0335-2.
- with Andreas Kreul: Nam June Paik. There is no rewind button for life. Dumont, 2007, ISBN 978-3-8321-7780-5.
- with Andreas Kreul: Sounds of the Inner Eye: John Cage, Mark Tobey and Morris Graves. University of Washington Press, Seattle 2002, ISBN 978-0-2959-8274-8.
- with Andreas Kreul, Uwe Goldstein und Katarina Vatsella: Tomma Wember. 3 Worte nur oder vier. Katalog, Hauschild, Bremen 2002, ISBN 3-89757-159-5.
- with Edith Decker: Video-Skulptur retrospektiv und aktuell 1963–1989. DuMont, Ostfildern 1989, ISBN 978-3-7701-2313-1.
- Wulf Herzogenrath: Videokunst der 60er Jahre in Deutschland, Kunsthalle Bremen, 2006, (No ISBN).
- Rudolf Frieling & Wulf Herzogenrath: 40jahrevideokunst.de: Digitales Erbe: Videokunst in Deutschland von 1963 bis heute, Hatje Cantz Verlag, 2006, ISBN 978-3-7757-1717-5.
- Wulf Herzogenrath: Das bauhaus gibt es nicht, Alexander Verlag, Berlin 2019, ISBN 978-3-89581-494-5.
