= Toshikatsu Endō =

Japanese sculptor (born 1950)

- 遠藤 利克
- Born: 1950 (age 75–76); Takayama, Gifu, Japan
- Education: Nagoya Junior College of Art and Design

Toshikatsu Endō (遠藤 利克, Endō Toshikatsu; born 1950) is a Japanese artist and sculptor.

Endō was born in 1950 in Takayama, Gifu. He graduated from Nagoya Junior College of Art and Design in 1972. He exhibited at Documenta 8 in 1987 and at the Venice Biennale in 1990.

== Works ==
Endō is one of Japan's leading sculptors, and his large-scale, realistic works are highly regarded in Japan and other countries. He transcends the boundaries of Mono-ha and publishes works that question the life and death of human beings and the origin of art. He also uses materials such as wood, water, soil and so on to create works that question the fundamental meaning of matter.

== Books ==
- 空洞説: 現代彫刻という言葉 ISBN 9784901646307 (2017)
- 藤利克―聖性の考古学 ISBN 9784773817164 (2017)
- Earth, Air, Fire, Water: The Sculpture of Toshikatsu Endo, ISBN 9780906860175 (1981)
