= Arnold Bode =

German architect, painter, designer and curator

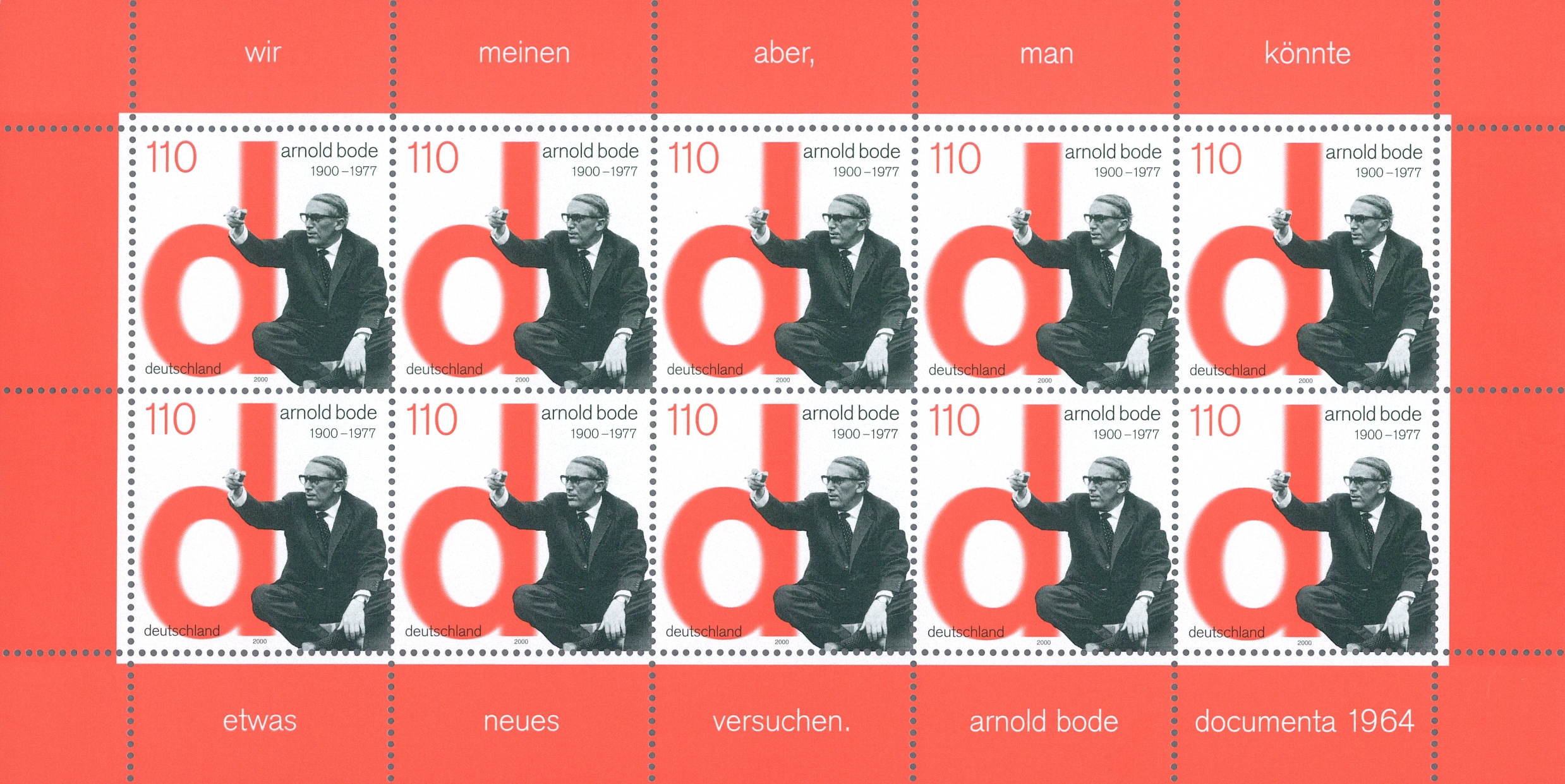
Block of stamps issued in 2000, commemorating Bode and documenta III (1964)

Arnold Bode (23 December 1900 – 3 October 1977) was a German architect, painter, designer and curator.

Arnold was born in Kassel, Germany. From 1928 to 1933, he worked as a painter and university lecturer in Berlin. However, when the Nazis came to power they banned him from his profession. He returned to his home town of Kassel following the war.

Bode organized the first documenta exhibition in Kassel in 1955. This featured a broad overview of 20th-century art using large spaces in an innovative way. It was an unprecedented success. Frieze Magazine claims: 'documenta's singularity becomes clear in comparison with the Venice Biennale, which began in 1895 and inspired the Bienal de São Paulo in 1951 before spawning endless copies across the globe in the 1990s. After the first national pavilion was built in 1907 by Belgium in the Giardini, the Biennale became a battleground between countries, their artists and their pavilions: an Olympics of art. By contrast, documenta's internationalism remains rooted in the failures of nationalism: the defeat and material hardship wrought by National Socialism and the repressed shame surrounding the Holocaust.'

Bode organized three more documenta exhibitions, finishing with documenta 4. Others have since continued to produce regular documenta exhibitions in Kassel. Bode received the German Federal Cross of Merit in 1974.

Bode's daughter is Renee Nele.

== See also ==
- List of German painters
