= Madelon Hooykaas =

Video Artist, Photographer and Film Maker

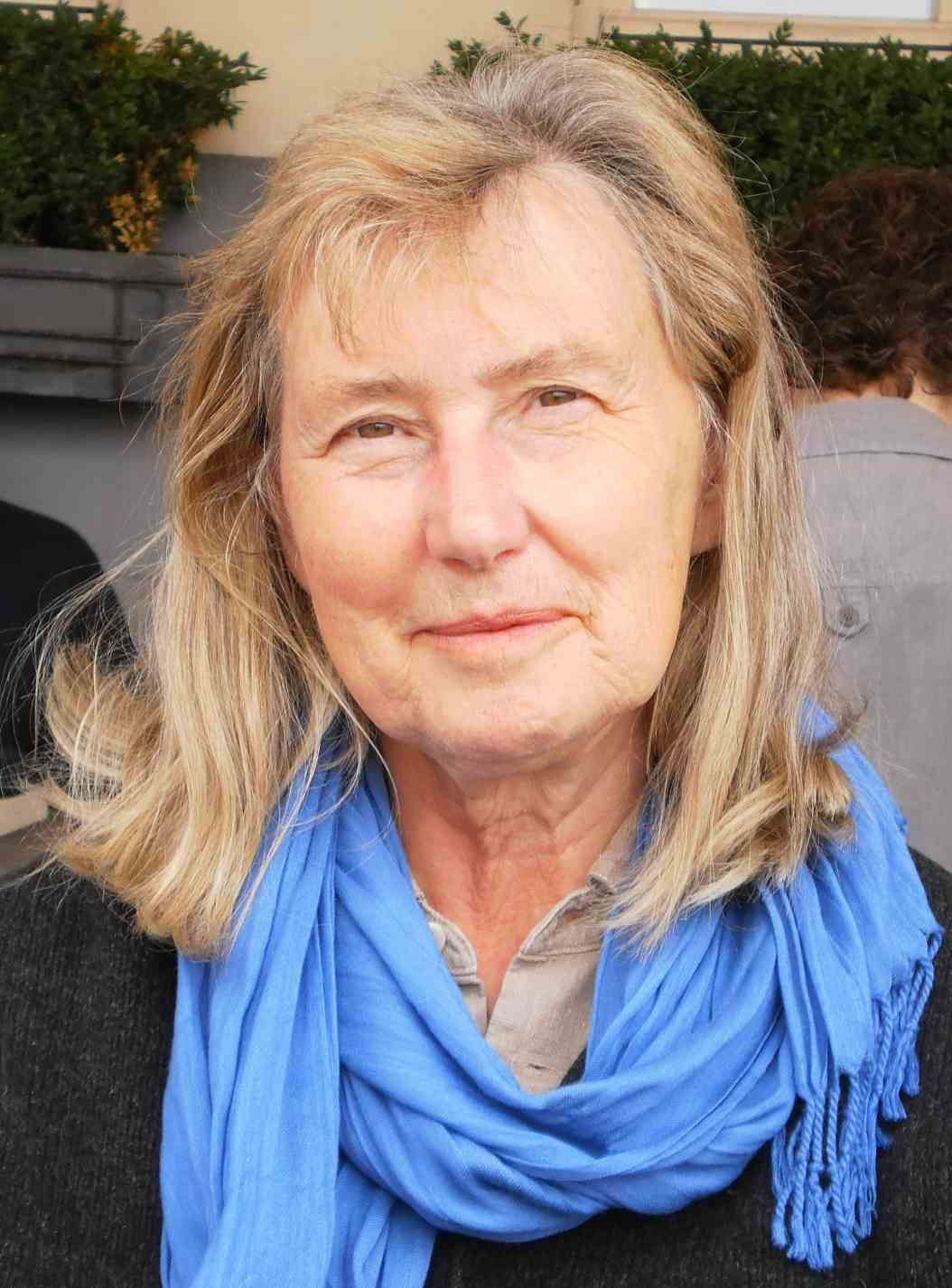
Madelon Hooykaas (2011)

Else Madelon Hooykaas (born 28 September 1942, in Maartensdijk) is a Dutch video artist, photographer and film maker. She makes films, sculptures, audio-video installations and has published several books.

== Biography ==
Madelon Hooykaas grew up in Rotterdam, the Netherlands. Before leaving for Paris in 1964, she studied under various Dutch photographers.

In 1966, she received the Europhot prize as a young photographer representing the Netherlands, and left for England for the photo project Along the Pilgrim's Way to Canterbury - inspired by Geoffrey Chaucer's The Canterbury Tales - and stayed as a visiting student at the Ealing School of Art & Design in London.

Her professional interest is in film making and photography as a tool in conceptual art, especially in so-called sequence photography. She worked in Brussels in a film laboratory and in Paris as a film assistant before establishing herself as a freelance photographer and filmmaker.

In 1968, she travelled to the United States for a year on a grant from the Ministry of Culture. In New York, she was assistant to photographers Philip Halsman and Bert Stern and was taught by photographers Gary Winogrand and Joel Meyerowitz. In California, an encounter with Alan Watts marked the beginning of her lifelong interest in Zen Buddhism. Back in the Netherlands, she settled in Amsterdam and started writing articles for Foto magazine, for which she interviewed Robert Doisneau and Jacques Henri Lartigue, among others. She worked briefly as a portrait and fashion photographer, meanwhile experimenting with Polaroid photographs in combination with texts and producing screen prints.

In 1970 she left for Japan to interview a number of photographers and with the aim of experiencing life in a Zen cloister. She was the first European woman to get permission to stay in a traditional monastery to take photographs. In 1971 her photo book Zazen, was published, for which she and the Dutch poet Bert Schierbeek compiled the texts. The publication of this book greatly enhanced her reputation and English and German editions followed. Five years later another book appeared, Death Shadow, for which Hooykaas made the photos and Schierbeek wrote the poem.

In 1972 Hooykaas held solo exhibitions of her Polaroid experiments in Il Diaframma in Milan, and The Photographer’s Gallery in London. Her work plays with space and time. Photo works by Hooykaas form part of the permanent collection of the Stedelijk Museum Amsterdam, the Museum of Modern Art (MoMA) in New York, the Centre Georges Pompidou/Musée National d’Art Moderne in Paris, the Bibliothèque Nationale de France (Paris) and the University of Leiden.

In 1972 Hooykaas started an intensive collaboration in the field of film with the Scottish photographer and filmmaker Elsa Stansfield in London and Amsterdam. Their first movie, ‘Een van die dagen’ (One of Those Days) was broadcast by Dutch public TV in 1973. It was also shown at festivals in London, Toronto and New York. After that followed ‘Overbruggen’ (About Bridges) (1975), which was shown in several festivals including Cork, Rotterdam, and Grenoble.

Under the name Stansfield/Hooykaas they made their first video installations from 1975 onwards including ‘What’s It to You?’ (1975), Journeys (1976), Just Like That (1977) and ‘Split Seconds’ (1979).

Their work deals with the relation between nature and spirituality and explores scientific principles and natural forces such as radio waves and magnetic fields. Hooykaas and Stansfield make use of contemporary technology such as film, audio and video in combination with organic materials such as sand, glass and copper.

A comprehensive monograph The Artist as Explorer was published by Jap Sam Books in 2023.

== Recent Exhibitions ==
• 2025 - Disruptions. Early Video Art in Europe, FMAC, Geneva, Switzerland

• 2019 - Everything is Round, Centraal Museum, Utrecht, the Netherlands

== Solo exhibitions and performances ==
- Haiku, the art of observing, IBASHO Gallery, Antwerp (BE), 23 March - 5 May 2024
- Emptiness and Infinite Space VIII with Jan Bor, Arti et Amiciae, Amsterdam (NL), 1st of March 2024
- Wheel of Life, Echo, Landhuis Oud Amelisweerd, Bunnik (NL), September 24 – December 15, 2023
- To Be or not to Bee, Museum Rijswijk (NL) April 24 - June 12, 2022
- Wheel of Life, Echo, Resonance, Machinery of Me, Arnhem (NL), October 3 – December 19, 2021
- Flying Time by Hooykaas/Stansfield, Ileana Contemporary Art, New Farm, Brisbane (AU), October 1 – 29, 2021
- Everything is round / Alles is rond, Centraal Museum Utrecht (NL), September 5, 2019 –January 20, 2020
- In the footsteps of performance with live electronic sound by Caro C, Manchester Art Gallery (UK), March 6, 2019
- Virtual Walls | Real Walls II performance, Threshold Arts Space, Perth, Scotland (GB), May 14 – July 26, 2018
- Virtual Walls / Real Walls I performance, Scotty, Projektraum für zeitgenössische Kunst und experimentelle Medien, Berlin (G), February 23, 2018
- Virtual Walls II performance, Oude Kerk, Amsterdam (NL), December 21, 2017
- Labyrinth of Lines by Hooykaas/Stansfield, MuHKA Museum of Contemporary Art Antwerp (B), October 19 - November 21, 2017
- Grid performance MuHKA Museum of Contemporary Art Antwerp (B), October 19 – November 21, 2017
- Virtual Walls I performance, Archivio Emily Harvey Foundation, Venice (IT), September 28, 2017
- Seeing the dark, installation, and Grid performance, Experimental Intermedia, New York (US), March 13, 2015
- Inspiration and Transformation performance and screening, Sakaiki (Yotsuya sanchome) Tokyo (JP), June 1, 2014
- Seeing in the Dark – Searching for the last blind Shamans in Japan’, Haiku - the Art of the Present Moment, Mount Analogue and photographs of Seeing in the Dark, Artist in Focus at European Buddhist Film Festival, Eye Film Museum, Amsterdam (NL), October 3 – 5, 2014
- Transformation/Inspiration exhibition with Keiko Sato, Japan Museum SieboldHuis, Leiden (NL), September 16 – November 25, 2012
- Reflection works by Madelon Hooykaas and by Hooykaas/Stansfield at Locus Solus Gallery, Antwerp (B), October 20 – November 17, 2012
