= Bertrand Lavier =

French artist

Bertrand Lavier (born 1949 in Châtillon-sur-Seine, France) is a French conceptual artist, painter and sculptor, belonging to the post-readymade era, inspired by the Duchampian legacy and the Nouveau réalisme, the artistic movement created by the art critic Pierre Restany in 1960. Lavier studied at the École Nationale Supérieure d'Horticulture in Versailles, France in 1968-1971.

== Style analysis ==
Lavier represented France at the 1976 Venice Biennale, French Pavilion in Venice, Italy. He has become known for transforming everyday objects into artwork by playing with their significance, their names and underlying meaning, and reinterpreting art language with his own humor and a unique personal style that uses three essential dimensions in his artwork: a paint touch over objects, a humorous painting language, and a novel approach to sculpture.

First, the paint touch: Lavier provokes the viewer by painting over everyday objects such as mirrors and stop signs in the 1980’s. In some of his larger works he painted over an automobile or a grand piano. Lavier paints over the object either with transparent acrylic paint or with each color of the original object itself, and more precisely with a type of large brushstroke that is characteristic of Vincent van Gogh’s paintings. Hence, this particular style has been nicknamed the “Lavier touch” or the “Touche Van Gogh”.

Second, the language: Lavier plays with language in the Foucauldian tradition by disrupting with his work and titles the notions acquired from references in our everyday lives. For example, in Lavier’s work “Rouge-Bordeaux par Novemail et Ripolin (1990),” the side-by-side monochrome panels of “Burgundy” red paint are literally out of the can with identical names, “Rouge-Bordeaux” from two paint makers, Novemail and Ripolin, yet the two burgundy reds are quite different in tones and that provokes the viewers to reflect on who defines the color ‘Bordeaux’ in life and in art. For Bertrand Lavier, “the world does not exist until you have named it.” Another such example, “geranium red” from Docus and Ripolin, two paint brands, was explained by Lavier himself at the Bourse de Commerce Pinault Collection in Paris, France in 2021.

Thirdly, Lavier creates sculpture-objects by the juxtaposition of everyday objects such as a set of pétanque boules on top of a loudspeaker, the sculpture being named “Intégrales / Triangle” (1989) by the brand names respectively of the pétanque game balls and of the loudspeaker used in the artwork. The juxtaposition of the two creates a virtual sound impression from the typical clinking sound of the pétanque boules coming out of the speaker. This artwork is present in the catalog of the Bertrand Lavier retrospective exhibition at the Musée national d'art moderne, Centre Georges Pompidou, Paris, France in 1991.

Likewise, in his early work, Lavier would set a refrigerator on top of a safe (Brandt / Fichet-Bauche, 1985). The safe becomes a pedestal for the refrigerator, creating the viewer’s impression of a sculpture emanating from the assemblage.

Lavier suggests that, as theorized by French philosopher Jean Baudrillard, we live in a world of appearances, a world in which simulation has replaced the real.

== Exhibitions ==
Bertrand Lavier has exhibited his work at the Serpentine Gallery in London, the Villa Sauber and École Supérieure d’Arts Plastiques in Monaco, the Centre for Fine Arts in Brussels, at the Middelheim Museum in Antwerp, Belgium, the Kröller-Müller Museum in Otterlo in the Netherlands, the Martin Gropius Bau in Berlin, the Haus der Kunst in Munich, and the Frankfurter Kunstverein in Frankfurt am Main, in Germany, the MAMCO in Geneva, the Kunsthalle in Berne, Switzerland, the Macro Museo d’Arte Contemporanea di Roma and the Villa Medici in Rome, Castello di Rivoli (Castle of Rivoli), Museo d’Arte Contemporanea in Turin, and the Centro per l’Arte Contemporanea Luigi Pecci, in Prato, Italy, the Museum Moderner Kunst Stiftung Ludwig Wien (Mumok) and Palais Liechtenstein Museum in Vienna, Austria, the Kunstmuseum Liechtenstein in Vaduz, Liechtenstein, the State Hermitage Museum in Saint Petersburg in Russia, the Museum of Modern Art (MoMA) and MoMA PS1 in New York, the Swiss Institute Contemporary Art New York, the Museum of Contemporary Art San Diego (MCASD), and the BAMPFA in Berkeley, California, the Atelier Hermès Dosan Park in Seoul, South Korea, the Hong Kong Museum of Art, the Centre Georges Pompidou, the Musée d’Art Moderne de Paris, the Grand Palais, the Louvre Museum, the Musée d’Orsay, the Musée du quai Branly – Jacques Chirac, the Palais de Tokyo, the Musée de la Monnaie de Paris, and the Bourse de Commerce–Pinault Collection in Paris, France, the Punta della Dogana in Venice, Italy, the Louis Vuitton Foundation in Paris and the Espace Louis Vuitton in Tokyo, Japan, the Palace of Versailles, the Fondation Vincent van Gogh in Arles, and Le Consortium museum in Dijon, France.

=== Selected solo exhibitions ===
- Centre National d'Art Contemporain, Paris, France 1975
- ARC/Musée d’Art Moderne de Paris, Paris, France in 1985
- Le Consortium museum, Dijon, France in 1986 and in 1988
- University of California Berkeley Art Museum and Pacific Film Archive (BAMPFA) in Berkeley, CA in 1988
- Musée National d’Art moderne- Centre Georges Pompidou (National Museum of Modern Art), Paris, France in 1991
- Museum Moderner Kunst Stiftung Ludwig Wien in Vienna, Austria in 1992
- Castello di Rivoli, Museo d’Arte Contemporanea (museum of contemporary art), Turin, Italy in 1996-1997
- “Bertrand Lavier: Walt Disney Productions” at the Museum of Contemporary Art, San Diego, California, United States in 1999
- “Bertrand Lavier, Expositions 1976–2001” at the Musée d’Art Moderne et Contemporain (MAMCO), Geneva, Switzerland in 2001
- Musée d’Art Moderne de Paris, France in 2002
- “Lavier in Prato” at the Centro per l’Arte Contemporanea Luigi Pecci, Prato, Italy in 2004
- “Correspondances Bertrand Lavier/ Edouard Manet” at the Musée d’Orsay, Paris, France in 2008
- “Bertrand Lavier at Villa Medicis”, Rome, Italy in 2009
- “Fontaine de Bertrand Lavier” at Chateau de Versailles, France in 2009
- Atelier Hermès, Seoul, South Korea in 2010
- “Bertrand Lavier since 1969” retrospective exhibition at the Centre Georges Pompidou, Paris, France in 2012
- “l’Affaire Tournesols” exhibition at the Fondation Vincent Van Gogh, Arles, France in 2014
- “Une retrospective” at the Kunstmuseum Liechtenstein, Vaduz, Liechtenstein in 2016
- “Merci Raymond” at the Musée de la Monnaie de Paris, France in 2016
- “Bertrand Lavier: La Vénus d’Amiens” exhibition at the Palais de Tokyo, Paris, France in 2016
- “The Project 2016: Bertrand Lavier à l’École des Beaux Arts de Monaco”, Monaco in 2016
- “Walt Disney Productions” exhibition at the Kunstmuseum Luzern, Switzerland in 2017
- “Medley” exhibition at Espace Louis Vuitton Tokyo, Tokyo, Japan in 2018
- Bourse de Commerce, Pinault Collection, Paris, France in 2021
- “Bertrand Lavier, Unwittingly But Willingly" at Le Consortium museum, Dijon, France in 2021-2022
- “Bertrand Lavier Solo Exhibition” at the Fosun Foundation in Shanghai, China in 2022

=== Participation at biennale and selected group exhibitions ===
- 37th Venice Biennale in 1976
- Museum of Modern Art (MoMA) PS1, New York, NY “Une idée en l’air” in 1980-1981
- Documenta in 1982 and 1987
- “An International Survey of Recent Painting and Sculpture” at the Museum of Modern Art (MoMA) New York, NY in 1984
- The UCLA Frederick S. Wight Art Gallery, Los Angeles, CA in 1985
- The John Gibson Gallery in New York, NY in 1986 and 1987
- The Center of Contemporary Art, Montreal, Canada in 1986
- “Around 1984: A Look at Art in the Eighties” at the Museum of Modern Art (MoMA) New York, NY in 2000
- “Contrepoint 2, de l’objet d’art à la sculpture”, Musée du Louvre, Paris, France in 2004-2005
- The Hong Kong Museum of Art, Hong Kong in 2009

== Selected public and private collections ==
- CAPC musée d'art contemporain de Bordeaux, France
- Castello di Rivoli Museo d’Arte Contemporanea (Castle of Rivoli), Turin, Italy
- Centre Pompidou – Musée National d’Art Moderne, Paris, France
- Fondation Louis Vuitton
- Generali Foundation, Italy
- Kröller-Müller Museum, Otterlo, The Netherlands
- Le Consortium, Dijon, France
- Mamco - Musée d’Art Moderne et Contemporain, Geneva, Switzerland
- MOCA Grand Avenue, Los Angeles, United States
- Musée d’Art Moderne de Paris - MAM/ARC, Paris, France
- Musée des arts contemporains, Grand Hornu, Belgium
- Museum of Contemporary Art, San Diego, California, United States
- Museum Moderner Kunst Stiftung Ludwig Wien in Vienna, Austria
- National Gallery of Art, Washington D.C., United States
- National Gallery of Victoria (NGV), Australia
- Pinault Collection, Paris, France

== Bibliography ==
- 1991 Text by Dominique Bozo, Paul-Hervé Parsy, Catherine Millet, Bernard Macadé, Thierry de Duve, and Denis Baudier: “Bertrand Lavier: Galeries contemporaines, Centre Georges Pompidou,” published by Musée national d'art moderne, Centre Georges Pompidou, Paris, France, 1991. Language: French. ISBN 978-2-85850-598-2
- 1991 Text by Giorgio Verzotti, Michel Nuridsany and Marco Meneguzzo: “Bertrand Lavier” published by Leonardo - De Luca Editori, Roma, Italy, 1991. Language: Italian. ISBN 978-88-7813-341-9
- 1992 Text by Lóránd Hegyi, Pierre Restany, and Uli Todoroff: “Bertrand Lavier Museum Moderner Kunst Stiftung Ludwig Wien; Palais Liechtenstein” published by Wien Museum Moderner Kunst, Vienna, Austria, 1992. Language: German. ISBN 978-3-900776-40-4
- 1994 Text by Hans-Ulrich Obrist: “Bertrand Lavier: Argo” published by Hatje Cantz Publishing, Germany, 1994. Language: French. ISBN 978-3-89322-278-0
- 1995 “Bertrand Lavier: Musée national des arts d'Afrique et d'Océanie” published by Réunion des Musées Nationaux (RMN), Paris, France. Language: French. ISBN 978-2-7118-3339-9
- 1997 Text by Giorgio Verzotti and Daniele Del Giudice: “Bertrand Lavier” published by Edizioni Charta, Milano, Italy, 1997. Language: English. ISBN 978-88-8158-103-0
- 1999 Text by Catherine Francblin: “Bertrand Lavier”, published by Flammarion, Paris, France, 1999. Language: French. ISBN 978-2-08-012149-3
- 2001 Text by Bertrand Lavier “Conversations 1982-2001”, Published by Édtions Mamco, Geneva, Switzerland, 2001. Language: French ISBN 978-2-940159-21-5
- 2002 Texts by Suzanne Pagé, Béatrice Parent and Daniel Soutif: “Bertrand Lavier” published by Musée d'Art Moderne de Paris, France 2002. Language: English. ISBN 978-2-87900-597-3
- 2008 Texts by Serge Lemoine, Catherine Millet and Sylvie Patry: “Correspondances Bertrand Lavier/ Edouard Manet” Musée d’Orsay, Paris, France, published by Editions Argol, 2008. Language: bilingual English / French. ISBN 978-2-915978-33-9
- 2009 Text by Frédéric Mitterrand, Giorgio Verzotti, Didier Repellin, Marylène, Malbert and Bernard Blistène: “Bertrand Lavier Roma” Published by Les Presses du Réel with Académie de France (French Academy in Rome), Villa Médicis, Rome, Italy, 2009. Language: bilingual Italian / French edition ISBN 978-2-84066-311-9 and bilingual English / French edition ISBN 978-2-84066-306-5
- 2012 Text by Michel Gauthier, “Bertrand Lavier depuis 1969” (Bertrand Lavier since 1969), Musée National d'Art Moderne Centre Georges Pompidou, published by Centre Pompidou, Paris, France 2012. Language: French. ISBN 978-2-84426-582-1
- 2012 Text by Lóránd Hegyi and Catherine Millet: ““Bertrand Lavier” published by Silvana Editorale, 2012. Language: English. ISBN 978-88-366-2192-7
- 2013 Text by Bertrand Lavier and Bernard Marcadet: “Bertrand Lavier: Walt Disney Productions” published by Editions Dilecta, 2013. Language: English. ISBN 979-10-90490-17-8
- 2014 Text by Marjolaine Lévy, Bernard Marcadé, “Bertrand Lavier, L’affaire Tournesols,” Fondation Vincent Van Gogh, published by Presses du Réel, 2014. Language: French. ISBN 978-2-84066-732-2
- 2016 Text by Bice Curiger, Fabian Flückiger, Lóránd Hegyi, Friedemann Malsch, and Thorsten Schneider: “Bertrand Lavier” published by Kehrer Verlag, Heidelberg. Germany, 2016. Language: German. ISBN 978-3-86828-764-6
- 2017 Text by Bice Curiger, Fabian Flückiger, Lóránd Hegyi, Friedemann Malsch, and Thorsten Schneider: “Bertrand Lavier, Kunstmuseum Liechtenstein” published by Friedemann Malsch, Germany, 2017. Language: German. ISBN 978-3-86828-764-6
- 2018 Text by Catherine Millet: “Bertrand Lavier, Les Grands Entretiens d’Art Press” published by Art Press, France, 2018. Language French. ISBN 978-2-906705-39-5
