= Danièle Nyst =

Belgian video artist

Danièle Nyst (1942 – 3 April 1998) was a Belgian video artist.

She was born in Liège and studied at the Academy of Fine Arts in Madrid. She was music programmer at RTBF (Radio Television Belge-Francaise). Nyst worked in collaboration with her husband Jacques Louis Nyst from 1983 to 1995. The couple was based in Sprimont.

Their work was exhibited at various international venues, including the Musée d'art moderne et d'art contemporain de Liège, the Stedelijk Museum Amsterdam, the Palais des Beaux-Arts, Brussels, the International Festival of Video in Tokyo, the São Paulo Art Biennial, the Museum of Modern Art in New York City, the Centre Georges Pompidou in Paris, the Institute of Contemporary Art, Boston, the Musée d'art contemporain de Montréal, the Biennale de Paris and the Locarno International Film Festival.

She died in a car accident in Sprimont in 1998.
