= Edward F. Fry =

American art historian, curator (1935–1992)

- Born: Edward Fort Fry; May 6, 1935; Ardmore, Pennsylvania
- Died: April 17, 1992 (aged 56); Gladwyne, Pennsylvania
- Education: B.A. Princeton University (1953); M.A. Harvard University (1961); Sorbonne University and the Bibliotheque Nationale de France (1961-1963)
- Known for: art historian, curator, educator
- Spouse: Alexandra (Sandra) Ericson (m. 1985)
- Awards: Guggenheim Fellowship for Humanities, US & Canada (1972)

Edward F. Fry (May 06, 1935 – April 17, 1992) was a prominent art historian, curator, critic and educator whose specialty was Cubism and art of the late 20th century. He was a curator at the Guggenheim Museum, New York in 1967 and organized an exhibition of Hans Haacke, which was famously cancelled and resulted in his being fired in 1971.

He then acted as a curator at large and critic, and taught, co-directing documenta 8 (1986) and helping organize a show for the Museum of Modern Art in New York (1989) as well as consulting on other shows and participating in conferences. He taught at several of the Big Three (colleges) in the United States, at the University of Pennsylvania, in Canada and elsewhere. Of the 14 books on art which he authored, co-authored or to which he contributed, his book on Cubism with 13 editions, published in 1966, is best known.

== Biography ==
Fry was born in Ardmore, Pennsylvania and after study at Princeton University (BA, 1953), Harvard (MA, 1961), and in France on a Fulbright Fellowship (1961–1963), taught for three years, publishing his book on Cubism in 1966, then in 1967 was hired by the Solomon R. Guggenheim Museum in New York where he organized late 20th-century exhibitions, such as a retrospective of David Smith. His Hans Haacke show, canceled by Thomas Messer in 1971, brought press and art world reaction.

After being fired, Fry returned to teaching and worked as a curator at large. In 1972-1973 he became a professor and chairman of Visual Arts at York University in Toronto (he resigned in 1973). In 1973, he received a Guggenheim Fellowship for Humanities, US & Canada.

Among the shows on which he worked is documenta 8 which he co-directed (1986) and a show at the Museum of Modern Art in New York (1989). He died of a heart attack in 1992 in Pennsylvania at the age of 56. His fonds is at the University of Pennsylvania: Kislak Center for Special Collections, Rare Books and Manuscripts.

== Controversy ==
Haacke's Shapolsky et al. Manhattan Real Estate Holdings, A Real Time Social System as of May 1, 1971 (1971), a work intended for the Guggenheim show in 1971, involved New York real estate dealings. Thomas Messer viewed the piece as too political for the museum, cancelled the exhibition and fired Fry who was firm in defending the artist's right to freedom of expression.

This controversy inspired later contemporary artists such as Doris Salcedo to dedicate a work evoking the Guggenheim Museum to Hans Haacke and Fry.

== Awards and hoours ==
- 1961-1963: Fulbright Fellowship;
- First president of the New York chapter of the New Art Association, formed at a College Art Association meeting to address art education;
- 1972-1973: Guggenheim Fellowship for Humanities, US & Canada;
- 1981: UNESCO medal, Paris;

== Selected publications ==
Of the 14 art history books which he wrote, co-authored or contributed, two have numerous reprints. "Cubism" has been translated into other languages.

- "Cubism" (1966);
- "David Smith: Painter, Sculptor, Draftsman" (1982);

Fry also wrote features for Art Forum.
