= Jacques Louis Nyst =

Jacques Louis Nyst (1942 – March 12, 1996) was a Belgian video artist and educator.

He was born in Liège and studied at the Academy of Fine Arts in Madrid and in Liège. He was a professor of drawing and video at the Academy of Fine Arts in Liège. Nyst worked in collaboration with his wife Danièle from 1983 to 1995.

Their work was exhibited at various international venues, including the Musée d'art moderne et d'art contemporain de Liège, the Stedelijk Museum Amsterdam, the Palais des Beaux-Arts, Brussels, the International Festival of Video in Tokyo, the São Paulo Art Biennial, the Museum of Modern Art in New York City, the Centre Georges Pompidou in Paris, the Institute of Contemporary Art, Boston, the Musée d'art contemporain de Montréal, the Biennale de Paris and the Locarno International Film Festival.

He died in Sprimont in 1996.
