= Elsa Stansfield =

British-Dutch visual artist (1945–2004)

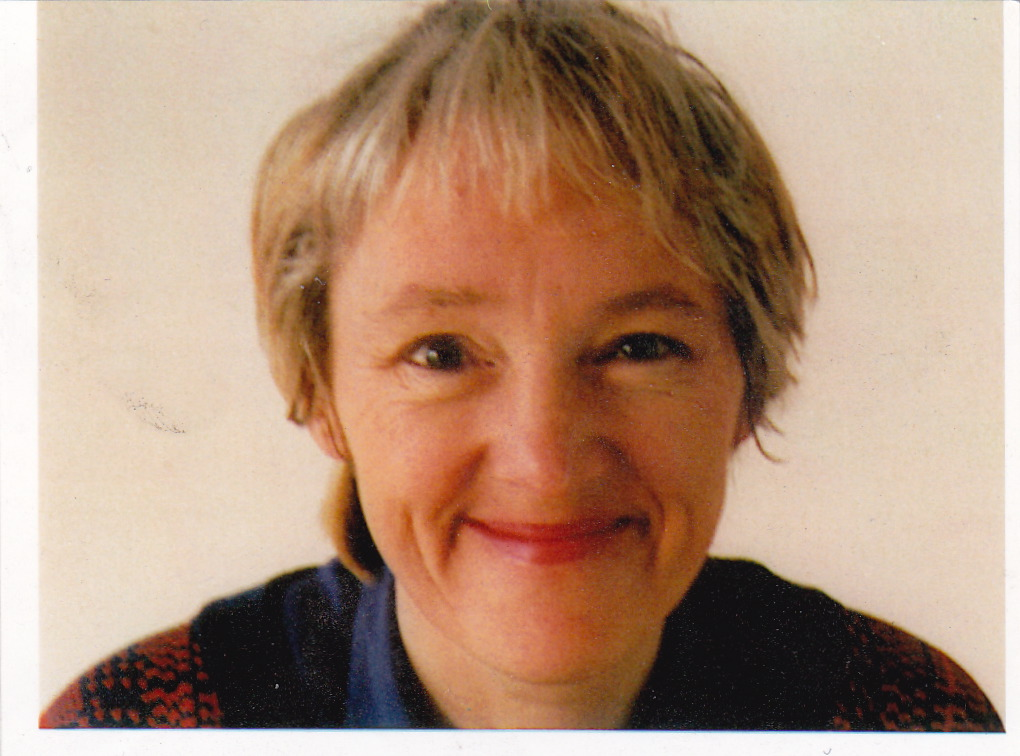
- Born: 12 March 1945; Glasgow, Scotland
- Died: 30 November 2004 (aged 59)
- Known for: Video Art, Installations
- Notable work: Works with Madelon Hooykaas Een van die dagen (One of Those Days) (1972); What’s It to You? (1975); Journeys (1976); Just Like That (1977); Split Seconds (1979)

Elsa Alexandra Stansfield (12 March 1945 –2004) was a Scottish artist, known for her video art and installations. Born in Glasgow, she died in Amsterdam in 2004.

From 1962 to 1965, Stansfield studied at the Glasgow School of Art. After that she studied photography and film at the Ealing School of Art & Design in London and Film studies at the Slade, University College London. In 1980 the artist moved to The Netherlands where she became head of the Time Based Media Department at the Jan van Eyck Academy in Maastricht until 1991. In 1972 she started to collaborate with Madelon Hooykaas with whom, over the course of 30 years, until Stansfield’s death, she made videotapes, video-installations, video-sculptures, sound sculptures and interactive installations and outdoor sculptural works.

== Early years ==
Elsa Alexandra Stansfield was born on 12 March 1945 in Glasgow of Canadian-Scottish and Swiss parentage. After what could be called a difficult start to life, a harmony was found in the home of a Glasgow family, the Stansfields. At 16 she was awarded a place as a full-time student in the Glasgow School of Art (1962–1965). After three years of study in drawing and painting, she decided to specialise in photography and film. With the help of a grant, she moved to London, where she continued her studies at the Ealing School of Photography (1965–1967). In this college she made her first film, an interpretation of Aesop's fable The Ant and the Grasshopper, a 15 min. colour and monochrome experimental film of the fable in today's city. Advised by Peter Montagnon (then Head of BBC Open University) and with the support of Professor Thorold Dickinson, Stansfield studied film at the Slade School of Fine Art, London, from 1967 to 1969. In the last year of college she worked as assistant in film production and editing. Also during the same year Elsa was curating film programmes and running the Arts Lab cinema in Drury Lane, London, the first experimental laboratory for film and theatre in England. Aged 24, Stansfield worked as producer for an American backed film ‘Journey to the East’, spending three months in India setting the production and later co-ordinating it back to London. On returning to London (1970) she established the ‘Eight, Nine and Ten’ Studio with the film director and editor Patricia Holland, and Electrophon Music with Delia Derbyshire and Brian Hodgson. The Studio meant to be a place for film editing with post-production facilities. This project involved the gradual conversion of a Covent Garden warehouse at 8, 9 and 10 Neal's Yard. In this studio some of Stansfield's works were produced. These include:

- ‘The Yak’, a series of animated children's films for television: Camera and sound for nos. 1 to 6
- ‘Space’, a 20 min. colour documentary on the problems of studio spaces for artists: production, sound and editing
- ‘Red, Red, Red’, a 20 min. film on commune life in Devon, B.F.I. Production: production and sound
- ‘Bridget Riley’, a 35 mm colour film on the artist's retrospective at the Hayward Gallery: production and direction
- ‘Behind the veil" by Eve Arnold, a 50 min. colour documentary on women in the Middle East, B.B.C. production: sound
- ‘Circle of Light’ by Antony Roland, a 30 min. colour documentary on the work of Pamela Bone: soundtrack in collaboration with Delia Derbyshire.

== Collaboration with Madelon Hooykaas ==
In 1972 Stansfield also started an intensive collaboration in the field of film with the Dutch photographer and filmmaker Madelon Hooykaas in London and Amsterdam. Their first movie, ‘Een van die dagen’ (One of Those Days) was broadcast by Dutch public TV in 1973. It was also shown at festivals in London, Toronto and New York. After that followed ‘Overbruggen’ (About Bridges) (1975), which was shown in several festivals including Cork, Rotterdam, and Grenoble.

Under the name Stansfield/Hooykaas they made their first video installations from 1975 onwards including ‘What’s It to You?’ (1975), Journeys (1976), Just Like That (1977) and ‘Split Seconds’ (1979).

In 1975 Stansfield moved her studio from Covent Garden to Wapping in East London. In 1978 she was awarded the first video Bursary of the Arts Council of Britain at Maidstone College of Art, Kent, which was established by David Hall, ‘the Godfather of British video art’.

== Moving to the Netherlands in 1980 ==
In 1980 Stansfield was asked to create a Time Based Media Department at the Jan van Eyck Academy, Maastricht. This was the first media department in a postgraduate academy in the Netherlands. She also started to build a video collection for the Academy. For this reason she moved from London to Maastricht, in the South of the Netherlands. International participants included David Garcia, Annie Wright, Paul Landon en Roos Theuws. She organized several seminal symposiums including ‘Video Maart’ (1981), and the symposium for the exhibition ‘The Luminous Image’ (1984), which included videotapes and installations by Marina Abramović and Ulay, Vito Acconci, Max Almy, Dara Birnbaum, Michel Cardena, Brian Eno, Kees de Groot, Nan Hoover, Michael Klier, Shigeko Kubota, Thierry Kuntzel, Marie-Jo Lafontaine, Mary Lucier, Marcel Odenbach, Tony Oursler, Nam June Paik, Al Robbins, Lydia Schouten, Elsa Stanfield and Madelon Hooykaas, Francesc Torres, Bill Viola, and Robert Wilson, in collaboration with the Stedelijk Museum in Amsterdam.

In 1986 Stansfield moved to Amsterdam while she worked as a Professor at the Jan van Eyck Academy until 1991.

Stansfield and Hooykaas’ work deals with the relation between nature and spirituality and explores scientific principles and natural forces such as radio waves and magnetic fields. They make use of contemporary technology such as film, audio and video in combination with organic materials such as sand, glass and copper. In their work they show that everything that exists is animated by movement and change.

For thirty-two years Stansfield and Hooykaas worked together and produced over hundred and fifty works, until Elsa Stansfield died unexpectedly in 2004.

British video art pioneer David Hall commented on Stansfield's death: "Elsa was the first artist to be awarded an Arts Council bursary to work with video in my department at Maidstone College of Art in the mid-seventies. Later, from 1980, as head of time-based media at the Jan van Eyck Academy, Maastricht, Holland, she enthusiastically organised international seminars and exhibitions. Her work in association with Madelon Hooykaas will be remembered as of profound importance in the developing European video art scene".

Tate Britain acquired Journeys (1976) by Hooykaas/Stansfield in 2018.
