= Tatsuo Kawaguchi =

Japanese painter (born 1940)

Tatsuo Kawaguchi (河口龍夫, Kawaguchi Tatsuo, born in 1940, Kobe Japan) is a Japanese multidisciplinary artist, whose practice often involves the use of objects and the investigation of materials. After studying painting at Tama Art University, Kawaguchi's diverse oeuvre has included drawing, sculpture, installation, photography, and video. He also co-founded the Group "i", a Kobe-based artistic collective, in 1965.

Kawaguchi's early work explored visual perception, principally through the use of objects and mirrors. After 1970, he began using the word "relation" (関係, kankei) in the titles of his works. Kawaguchi seeks to put on display the fragile relationships between the visible and the invisible that create the world around us. The artist intends for his works - which have employed both man-made elements such as lightbulbs or motors, as well as natural elements like stone, wood, seeds and metals - to be perceived of as perpetual works in progress, transforming with time. Environmental anxiety has also informed the development of Kawaguchi's "relation" works. After the Chernobyl disaster, the artist has continuously enveloped various objects, such as seeds, plants, soil, or tools, in lead, a material that protects against radiation.

Kawaguchi's work has featured in major international exhibitions and has been associated by art historians with artistic movements such as land art, minimalism and Mono-ha. Kawaguchi has also been identified as belonging to the loosely-affiliated Gainen-ha (Conceptual School), alongside Yutaka Matsuzawa, Jiro Takamatsu, Kazuo Okazaki, Saburo Muraoka (with whom he collaborated in 1973), Isamu Wakabayashi, and Aiko Miyawaki.

Kawaguchi was awarded the First Iue Culture Prize for Art and Culture in 1974 as well as the Prize of Japan Arts Foundation in 2008. He is Professor Emeritus at the University of Tsukuba, Institute of Art and Design. He lives and works in Chiba City.

== Early career ==
=== Paintings and works with mirrors, 1962-1970 ===
Born in Kobe, Kawaguchi studied painting at Tama University of Fine Art, Tokyo, where he graduated with a BFA in 1962. From 1962 to 1965 he primarily created non-figurative paintings. His compositions are structured by bands of alternating colors, upon which the artist painted repetitive geometric forms. Certain paintings, especially those executed in black and white, show Kawaguchi's interest in optical illusions, as he arranges patterns and colors to suggest new shapes within the composition.

Art critic Akira Tatehata describes these early paintings as "illusive," arguing that the artist's taste for the conceptual can already be sensed: "His mechanical repetitions of circles, triangles, stripes and other sign units, while light and rhythmical, even humorous, are at the same time quite inorganically austere, decidedly imparting a chill to the pictorial space."

During this period, Kawaguchi also engaged in some sculptural work. While teaching at a middle school in 1964, a student who had cast his hand in plaster struggled to remove it from the hardening mass. The artist kept and subsequently painted the mold with the imprint of the boy's hand, considering it a "monument taken from the student's life, an experience of human growth and time never seen again." His 1967 series, Interrelation, presents vibrant vinyl wires coiling around each other, mounted on plywood. This series may be understood as an early manifestation of the artist's interest in exploring relationships (kankei), illustrated through the criss-crossing lines of the wires.

The illusionary element that revealed itself in Kawaguchi's early paintings took on a sculptural form in the late sixties. In 1967, he created a series of moving works in which a three-dimensional geometric form (a cylinder or a cone) was placed next to a two-dimensional shape (a triangle or a rectangle) in a transparent box. The two-dimensional shape was mechanically spun on its axis by a high-powered motor. Animated by this movement, the two-dimensional form could be temporarily perceived of as three-dimensional, like the neighboring solid form.

Mirrors became an important element of Kawaguchi's work exploring illusion. Throughout 1967 and 1968, he attached halved, solid geometric forms (semi-cylinders, semi-cones, semi-spheres) to mirrors mounted vertically upon plywood. The image reflected in the mirror thus gave the appearance of the form in its entirety. The image would also transform depending on the position of the viewer. He later employed half-mirrors to further play with perceptions of light by introducing darkness, creating "a continuous space of real and virtual images." Kawaguchi's mirror constructions culminated in the 1968 work Two Mirrors (Between Mirror and Mirror). Focusing purely on the mirror as an object, the artist bound two mirrors together with rope, their reflective sides facing each other, "confining pure space to an infinitely repeated mirror image."

Kawaguchi's mirror works were notably presented at the spring 1968 exhibition organized by Junzō Ishiko and Yusuke Nakahara, Tricks and Vision: Stolen Eyes, at the Tokyo Gallery and the Muramatsu Gallery. Kawaguchi's Interrelation of Objet and Image in Infinite Space; or the Hollow Woman was shown at the Kobe exhibition Contemporary Space '68 - Light and Environment. The artist presented a plaster copy of the head and torso of the Venus de Milo. Fragmented into horizontal segments, these were then mounted in boxes lined with mirrors and half-mirrors, with the full ensemble illuminated by a black light. The viewer thus perceived the interior and the exterior of the sculpture as well as its multiple reflections within a seemingly infinite space. Kawaguchi commented: "In today's world where objects become images and images objects, I emphasize the need for new thinking based on the mutual relationships and interplay between objects and images."

=== Group "i" ===
Group "i" (グループ〈位〉, guruppu "i") was co-founded by Kawaguchi in Kobe in 1965, alongside eight other young artists: Inoue Haruyuki, Okuda Yoshimi, Takeuchi Hirokuni, Toyohara Yasuo, Nakata Makoto, Mukai Takeshi, Murakami Masami, and Yoshida Tsutomu. During an interview, Kawaguchi stated that the use of the kanji 位 in the collective's name came from words such as 単位 (tani, meaning unit), 位置 (ichi, meaning place or position) and 位相 (isō, meaning phase). Each member was thus considered as a "unit" within the group.

Group "i" exhibited collectively seven times between 1965 and 1968. While the first exhibition in June 1965 was traditional in nature, with each member presenting their own artworks, their subsequent interventions challenged expectations of group art exhibitions across a variety of media, including performance, installation and video. Kawaguchi has said that the activities of Group "i" were the catalyst for the young artist to transition from painting to other art forms.

In August 1965, Group "i" created the work Hole at the Gifu Independent Art Festival. The members gathered on the bank of the Nagara River and, working silently, dug a 32-foot wide and 5-foot deep hole over the course of eight days. When the digging was finished, the members filled the hole back up. Art critic Yusuke Nakahara stated that Hole "negated the individuality of the members," a recurring motivation in the group's body of work.

The group published "The Manifesto for Non-Sensual Thought" in 1966, which states: "We are dedicated to the non-sensual, and announce that we will think in accordance with magnified consciousness [...] In order to be conscious of something other than the self, thought is necessary; not the senses."

Nakahara importantly notes that Kawaguchi's work as an independent artist illustrates a departure from the ideas advanced in the manifesto. Kawaguchi does not seek to negate the senses, but rather addresses their inexactness, and in particular, the limits of the sense of human sight.

== Selected major works ==
=== Land and Sea, 1970 ===
Land and Sea is a large-scale photographic work in Kawaguchi's oeuvre and appeared at the 1970 Tokyo Biennale, Between Man and Matter. The artist laid four planks, cut from the same tree, on the shoreline of the Suma coast and fixed them together with rope. He then photographed the planks over the course of the day from a fixed point of view. The result was a series of 26 photographs, each measuring 90 x 148 cm, with the time of the capture printed in the corner of each image.

As art historian Yasufumi Nakamori has established, much of the photography shown at Between Man and Matter "used seriality to incorporate the element of time." Nakahara argued that the work also interrogates language. The photographs, showing the transformation of the shoreline as the day drifts on, "[point out] that a shoreline has no substance [...] it suggests the estrangement of 'shoreline' as a static word and a shoreline as a dynamic image." The dissonance between objects and the words that represent them was explored that same year in Kawaguchi's installation Fetters of Meaning, in which the artist pasted words from the dictionary upon the objects they defined, such as "wall" or "dictionary." As many non-tangible phenomena could not be labeled in this manner, this exercise served to demonstrate, in the words of scholar Masachi Osawa, "the impossibility of defining things with language."

Kawaguchi repeatedly employed photography in the early 1970s. His various series capture subtle changes in the natural environment, sometimes occurring naturally, and sometimes provoked by the artist.

=== Relation works, 1970 - today ===
After 1970, Kawaguchi began frequently titling his works with the word "relation." Rather than simply juxtaposing differing materials, these object-based installations aim to "expose" that which cannot be seen. Masachi Osawa explains that, for Kawaguchi, relationships "[compose] the identity of things [...] the direct existence of a thing is mediated by relationship," as such, the "urge to somehow capture relation, which is the foundation of the identity of things, controls Kawaguchi's work."These works point to the artist's keen attention towards the subtlety of evolution, change, and instability.

Kawaguchi was one of many Japanese artists around 1970 who questioned "relation," often "in connection to ideas of tension, liminality, intersection, or contact." This generalized interest revealed itself in Yusuke Nakahara's subtitle for the 1970 Tokyo Biennale: "Between Man and Matter." He commented: "At present it seems that certain artists are attempting to make art into that relation between man and matter, including the resultant contradictions. In some cases this appears as an emphasis on the relation itself, and in others as the experience of relationship." This was especially true of artists associated with Mono-ha, such as Jiro Takamatsu, Noboru Sekine, Suga Kishio, and Lee Ufan, who has called all of his sculptures Relatum since 1972.

For Relation - Heat, presented at the National Museum of Modern Art, Tokyo in 1970, Kawaguchi laid plate casts on the floor and propped lead bars against gallery walls, each of which had been melted to varying degrees. The metal elements of differing sizes served the purpose of calling to mind the heat, invisible to the viewer, that had transformed them. This principle of "exposing" the unseen was taken up again for the installation Relation - Energy, presented at the Paris Biennial in 1973. For this large-scale installation, the artist laid a series of objects—including an electric range, fluorescent light bulbs, and a motor—across the floor, all interconnected by a network of snaking wires. The goal of the work was to exhibit energy via different forms: light, heat, or movement.

From 1976 until 1989, Kawaguchi carried out the series Relation - Quality (関係 - 質, kankei - shitsu). What may at first appear to be abstract, painterly compositions are in fact metal objects—nails, steel plates or wires—wrapped in paper or cloth and dampened with either rainwater or an alkaline solution. While the viewer cannot see the metal objects, they are nonetheless able to perceive of them thanks to the patterns of rust that develop on the outer cloth or paper.

Another method of "exposing" the unseen Kawaguchi employs involves the artist enveloping objects in metal, blocking them from view. It is possible to relate this practice to the artist's fascination with darkness that can be traced back to 1968, when Kawaguchi created an exhibition at the Muramatsu Gallery in Tokyo, held entirely in the dark, the darkness being the work exposed. Later, in 1975, he produced a series of works in which he "sealed" darkness in iron containers, motivated by the idea of giving darkness a physical form.

In 1983, Kawaguchi wrapped a living potted tree in copper for the work Relation - Spirit (関係 - 気, Kankei - ki). After the Chernobyl disaster of 1986, the artist began sealing items in lead, a material that protects against radiation. Such objects included seeds, water, air, soil, and farming tools. Kawaguchi then constructed greenhouses, their glass covered in lead, for an installation at the Museum of Modern Art, Kamakura in 1990. As such, the action of enveloping objects in metal, which was originally a means of exploring perception, took on a new and urgent significance in the wake of environmental anxiety. Yusuke Nakahara has also commented that the artist's act of enveloping seeds and plants in lead suggests "that a situation has arrived in which these things can only be observed indirectly," referring to the preciousness of such resources. French art historian Jean-Hubert Martin has called such works "the most radical criticism of this atomic age."

Lotus flowers and their seeds have been a recurring element in Kawaguchi's lead works since 1990. After learning that lotus seeds discovered amongst Jōmon period ruins were able to germinate, Kawaguchi imagined that the lotus seeds he encases in lead may one day, thousands of years in the future, sprout. The artist's works thus evoke, in the words of art historian Alexandra Munroe, "a sense of organic growth arrested and protected for eternity."

== Collections and selected exhibitions ==
Kawaguchi's work has been collected by a number of institutions in Japan and beyond, including the National Museum of Modern Art, Tokyo; the Museum of Modern Art, Kamakura; National Museum of Modern Art, Kyoto; the National Museum of Modern Art, Osaka; the Iwaki City Art Museum, Iwaki; the Chiba City Museum of Art, Chiba City; the Nagoya City Art Museum, Nagoya; the Hokkaido Museum of Modern Art, Hokkaido; the Louisiana Museum of Modern Art, Humlebæk, Denmark; the Art Gallery of New South Wales, Sydney, and the Hirshhorn Museum, Washington DC.

=== Selected solo exhibitions ===
- 1968: DARK, Muramatsu Gallery, Tokyo,
- 1971: 172,800 Seconds, Galerie 16, Kyoto
- 1987: Series Today's Artist - Tatsuo Kawaguchi, Osaka Contemporary Art Centre, Osaka
- 1990: Today's Artist - V - '90 Tatsuo Kawaguchi, The Museum of Modern Art, Kamakura
- 1997: Relation - Tatsuo Kawaguchi, Chiba City Museum of Art, Chiba
- 1998: Sight Breathing/Tatsuo Kawaguchi: Dialogue with the Unseen, Iwaki City Art Museum, Fukushima
- 1998: Kawaguchi Tatsuo 1990-1998: Sealed Time, Art Tower Mito, Ibaraki
- 1999: Tatsuo Kawaguchi: Relation - Kyoto, Kyoto Municipal Museum of Art, Kyoto
- 2002: Japan Contemporary Art - Kawaguchi Tatsuo, Busan Museum of Art
- 2004: Relation - Floating of Time, Nagoya City Art Museum, Nagoya
- 2005: Time within Time, Aomori Contemporary Art Centre, Aomori
- 2007: Tatsuo Kawaguchi: the Invisible and the Visible, Hyogo Prefectural Museum of Art/Nagoya City Art Museum
- 2008: DARK BOX 2008, Nagoya City Art Museum, Nagoya
- 2008: Voyage of Time, Nizayama Forest Art Museum, Toyama
- 2008: Positions Towards Infinity: Works of Tatsuo Kawaguchi in 1970s, Utsunomiya Museum of Art, Tochigi
- 2009: Kawaguchi Tatsuo: Language Time, Life [1 & 2], The National Museum of Modern Art, Tokyo
- 2010: Kawaguchi Tatsuo: The Spiral Time, Kake Museum of Art, Okayama
- 2012: Let There Be Light! Tatsuo Kawaguchi: World After 3/11, Iwaki City Art Museum, Fukushima

=== Selected group exhibitions ===
- 1970: Tokyo Biennale '70: Between Man and Matter, Tokyo Metropolitan Art Gallery, Tokyo
- 1973: 12th Biennale de São Paulo, São Paulo
- 1973: 8th Biennale de Paris, Musée d'art moderne, Paris
- 1986: Japon des Avant Gardes, Musée national d'art Moderne - Centre Georges Pompidou, Paris
- 1989: Magiciens de la Terre, Musée national d'art Moderne - Centre Georges Pompidou, La Grande Halle de la Villette, Paris
- 1992: The Urban Environment and Art in Japan: My Home Sweet Home in Ruins, Setagaya Art Museum, Tokyo
- 1994: Memento Mori: Visions of Death c. 1500 - 1994, Tochigi Prefectural Museum of Fine Arts, Tochigi
- 1994: Japanese Art After 1945: Scream Against the Sky, Guggenheim Museum, New York
- 2000, 2003, 2012 : Echigo-Tsumari Art Triennale, Niigata
- 2002: Power of Art, Hyogo Prefectural Museum of Art, Hyogo
- 2004: Group "i", Hyogo Prefectural Museum of Art, Hyogo
- 2009: Waiting for Video: Works from the 1960s to Today, The National Museum of Modern Art, Tokyo
- 2009: Vital Signals: Japanese and American Video Art from the 1960s and 70s, Los Angeles County Museum of Art, Los Angeles
- 2011: Morphology of Emptiness, National Museum of Modern Art, Tokyo
- 2012: Ends of the Earth: Land Art to 1974, The Museum of Contemporary Art, Los Angeles
