= Gilbert Lascault =

French writer, novelist and essayist (1934–2022)

Gilbert Lascault (25 October 1934 – 19 December 2022) was a French novelist, essayist, and art critic.

== Biography ==
Lascault was born in Strasbourg on 25 October 1934. Agrégé of philosophy in 1960, Gilbert Lascault began writing his thesis, « Le monstre dans l’art occidental » ("The monster in Western art"), an essay of aesthetics inaugurating his writings to come. He discovered contemporary art by meeting Henri Michaux and Jean Dubuffet.

An engraver and calligrapher, Gilbert Lascault taught aesthetics and the philosophy of art at the Paris West University Nanterre La Défense (from 1988) then at the Sorbonne (since the second half of the 1990s), "proposing" seminars of uncertainty "to students and researchers in philosophy, art history and plastic arts".

A specialist in surrealism, he has published several books on this subject.

He has written in numerous magazines: Traverses, La Quinzaine littéraire, L’Art Vivant, Artstudio, XXe, Beaux Arts Magazine, La Revue d’esthétique

For many years, he was one of the "pillars", of the Des Papous dans la tête program on France Culture, and has long participated in Panorama and Les Décraqués. In 1995, he was the guest of honor of the Oulipo.

Lascault participated, as author, in the realization of a large number of artist's books with, in particular, Pierre Alechinsky, Marcel Alocco, Christian Babou, Eliz Barbosa, Cantié, Henri Cueco, Bertrand Dorny, Ghislaine Escande, Nathalie Grall, Françoise Gründ, Philippe Hélénon, Joël Leick, Stanislav Marijanović, Marianne Montchougny, Daniel Nadaud, Gaëlle Pelachaud, Denis Pouppeville, Antonio Seguí, Brigitte Tartière, Gérard Trignac, and Jacques Vimard.

Lascault wrote extensively on the works of artists such as Jean Dubuffet, Jean Tinguely, Pierre Alechinsky, Jean Le Gac, Vladimir Veličković, Coco Téxèdre, Alexandre Bonnier, Jean-Pierre Vielfaure, Anne and Patrick Poirier, Marcel Alocco, Gérard Titus-Carmel, Henri Cueco, Christian Boltanski, Leonardo Cremonini, and Bang Hai Ja....

From 4 May 2005, he was régent du Collège de 'Pataphysique at the chair of Teratoscopy & Dinography.

In 2014, the musée de l'Hospice Saint-Roch of Issoudun devoted a large retrospective exhibition « Les chambres hantées de Gilbert Lascault ».

Lascault died on 19 December 2022, at the age of 88.

== Publications ==
- 1963: Le Monstre dans l'art occidental, Klincksieck
- 1969: Esthétique et psychanalyse, in La Psychanalyse, collectif, éd.: S.G.P.P.; series "Le point de la question"
- 1975: Un monde miné, Christian Bourgois
- 1976: Enfances choisies, Christian Bourgois
- 1976: With Gianfranco Baruchello, Alphabet d'Éros, Paris, Ed. Galilée
- 1977: Figurées, défigurées : petit vocabulaire de la féminité représentée, Union générale d’édition (UGE), series 10/18, Paris
- 1977: Un îlot tempéré, Christian Bourgois
- 1979: Écrits timides sur le visible, UGE, 10/18, Paris
- 1979: Voyage d'automne et d'hiver, Christian Bourgois
- 1981: La destinée de Jean Simon Castor, Christian Bourgois
- 1981: Boucles et nœuds, Éditions Balland
- 1982: Alexandre Bonnier - Autour d'images et d'écrits, Editions Shakespeare International
- 1982: Un herbier pour Marinette
- 1983: Encyclopédie abrégée de l'empire vert, Maurice Nadeau
- 1983: Marmottes à l'imparfait (illustrations by Jan Voss), Ryōan-ji
- 1983: Arrondissements (illustrations by Pierre Alechinsky ), Repères
- 1984: Coutume des Vents, illustrations by Nicolas Alquin, éd. Fata Morgana, Montpellier
- 1984: Malaval, Art Press/Flammarion
- 1985: Faire et défaire, éd. Fata Morgana, Montpellier
- 1985: Éloges à Geneviève, novel, Balland
- 1985: Francis Limérat and Jean-Pierre Vielfaure - Les arpenteurs de l'utopie, parcours, Éditions du C.A.C. Pablo-Neruda, Corbeil-Esonnes
- 1986: La Grande Forêt Alquin, illustrations by Nicolas Alquin, éd. Le Salon d’Art, Brussels
- 1986: Les amours d'Arthur-toujours-là et de Monica-Belle-de-Givre, illustrations by Petra Werlé, Baby Lone, Strasbourg
- 1986: Consanguins d'Omènes, illustrations by Janko Stanovnik, éd. Tropismes
- 1987: Jeux d’échecs – Jeu de guerres, illustrations by Nicolas Alquin, éd. L’Échoppe, Caen
- 1987: 420 minutes dans la cité des ombres, éd. Ramsay, Caen
- 1989: Le petit chaperon rouge, partout, éditions Seghers
- 1992: Jour de désert, illustrations by Nicolas Alquin, éd. L’Échoppe
- 1998: Le Ieel bleu, with eight lithographs by Lascault (16 copies printed)

...

- 2014: Les Chambres hantées, Tarabuste éditions

== See also ==
- Collège de 'Pataphysique
- Artist's book
- Oulipo
