= Magiciens de la terre =

1989 contemporary art exhibition in Paris

Magiciens de la Terre was a contemporary art exhibition at the Centre Georges Pompidou and the Grande halle de la Villette in Paris, France, from 18 May to 14 August 1989.

== Background ==
=== Primitivism ===
Magiciens de la Terre literally translates to "Magicians of the Earth." In 1989, in the wake of the "Primitivism" show at MOMA, curator Jean-Hubert Martin set out to create a show that counteracted ethnocentric practices within the contemporary art world as a replacement for the format of the traditional Paris Biennial. This exhibition sought to correct the problem of "one hundred percent of exhibitions ignoring 80 percent of the earth." Martin did this in his show, Magiciens de la Terre, exhibited at the Centre Georges Pompidou and the Grande halle de la Villette in Paris. With Magiciens de la terre Martin successfully organized an international exhibition of contemporary art that featured 50% Western and 50% non-Western artists shoulder to shoulder in an equal manner where all participants were still alive at the time of exhibiting, making it truly contemporary. Magiciens also marked a departure from previous exhibitions of non-Western work by identifying non-Western artists by their proper names alongside their Western counterparts, who were always identified in this manner. The artists were presented as individuals rather than by geographic region or time period as was commonplace. This was an attempt by Martin and his curatorial team to subvert the illusion of Eurocentric superiority in the field of artistic representation and the vision of the world inherited from the colonial age.

Martin's show confronted problems presented by earlier exhibitions that perpetuated a colonialist mentality, such as the aforementioned show "Primitivism in 20th Century Art: Affinity of the Tribal and the Modern held at the Museum of Modern Art, New York. Many critics condemned "Primitivism", as it fell into a Modernist stereotypical notion of "pure aestheticism" of the work of native cultures. "Primitivism" stated that it was only interested in displaying tribal works that influenced Modern artists and in studying how this phenomenon functioned within the Modernist discourse. Many of the tribal works were presented vis-à-vis Modernist works with little or no historical evidence of these works having drawn inspiration from specific "primitive" works or, in some cases, even a "primitive" idiom. (Varnedoe 13)

=== L'Exposition Coloniale ===
In addition to the "Primitivism" show, Magiciens de la Terre worked with the 1931 show, L'Exposition Coloniale as a counter-reference. This exhibition had been organized in a typical colonial fashion, to show the economic and moral superiority of France, as well as the products of the colonized. The souvenir medal from the exhibition speaks volumes. The bas-relief features a Western woman on the right (A personification of France with references to allegorical representations of Liberty, Truth, or Wisdom) outstretching her arm to gently comfort and protect her smiling representations of ethnic stereotypes. The Paris Colonial Exhibition is covered within the Magiciens catalog, where this show's colonialist ideology is explained. This show served as a counterexample of what Magiciens was not.

Although Magiciens served to counteract the ideology expressed in the two shows, the show was also meant to resolve long-standing problems of the format of the Paris Biennial. In years past, the French curatorial team would select the countries to be exhibited, and representatives from the respective countries would select artists that they deemed the greatest artistic talents of their nation. In the view of certain art critics, this method was seen to have failed for including non-Western artists whom those critics regarded as second-rate practitioners (in style and content) of artistic movements that originated in the West. Another critical view was that these artists were not exemplary of the diversity of human cultures, and their work only strengthened Western hegemony. But other critics saw in such pronouncements as "second rate" and "originated in the West," the very Eurocentrism these critics were reputedly denouncing, especially as many of the so-called "Western" styles could trace their origins to visual cultures outside and older than Western civilization. In this light, the lack of self-reflection by these critics, with regard to their own criteria and self-reference, showed the entire enterprise of Western criticism to be wanting of a deeper self-analysis, at the same time as it exposed an urgent need for a more thorough exposure to, and exchange with, cultures and histories distinct from the West.

With the failings of the previous shows in mind, Martin organized Magiciens by selecting one hundred artists from around the world: fifty from the so-called "centers" of the world (the United States and Western Europe) and fifty from the "margins" (Africa, Latin America, Asia, and Australia). No specific criteria were set up for the selection of the individual works in the show as long as this numerical ratio was maintained. When selecting artists from outside the Western tradition, the curator claimed to have chosen artists according to their artworks' "visual and sensual experiences". Martin further explained:

I want to play the role of someone who uses artistic intuition alone to select objects which come from totally different cultures [...]. But obviously, I also want to incorporate into that process the critical thinking which contemporary anthropology provides on the problem of ethnocentrism, the relativity of culture, and intercultural relations. [...] But let us not forget, after all, I have to think of this project as an "exhibition". That is, if an ethnographer suggests a particular example of cult [...], but the objects of this culture would not communicate sufficiently with a Western spectator in a visual-sensuous manner, I would refrain from exhibiting them.

== Critical reception ==
In an interview with Benjamin H. D. Buchloh Martin acknowledged that his method had inherent flaws, but also noted that any methodological framework for the selection of works would make similar mistakes. Martin felt that the inclusion of the fifty non-Western artists would begin to facilitate a change by de-centering notions of artistic centers within the Western tradition of art practice.

Magiciens de la Terre was reviewed by Jeremy Lewison for The Burlington Magazine in August 1989. Lewison gave examples of how the curation of Western artwork along with "margined' art creates cross-currents impacting viewers perception of Western artists' attempts:

The ritualistic and religious nature of the Aborigine work endows Long's circle with a meaning which, in another context, it might not have ... Where religion, sex, death and functionalism seem to be the basis for the creation of most forms of 'ethnic' art, art itself is often the only reason for the making of western art ... Baldessari's photographic story-book seems tired and knowing when juxtaposed with the innocence of Frédéric Bruly Bouabré, whose own imaginative tales deal with the language of animals, stones and trees and illustrate the evolution of the nuclear missile from the chicken-bone by way of the arrow, and whose view of history (Caesar and Ulysses, for example), previously known to westerners in a European form seems equally plausible as African history.

== Artists featured ==
- Marina Abramović (Serbia)
- Dennis Adams (US)
- Sunday Jack Akpan (Nigeria)
- Jean-Michel Alberola (Algeria)
- Amidou Dossou (Benin)
- Giovanni Anselmo (Italy)
- Rasheed Araeen (Pakistan)
- Nhuche Kaji Bajracharya (Nepal)
- John Baldessari (US)
- José Bédia (Cuba)
- Joe Ben Jr (US)
- Jean-Pierre Bertrand (France)
- Gabriel Bien-Aimé (Haiti)
- Alighiero Boetti (Italy)
- Christian Boltanski (France)
- Erik Bulatov (Russia)
- Louise Bourgeois (France)
- Stanley Brouwn (Suriname)
- Frédéric Bruly Bouabré (Ivory Coast)
- Daniel Buren (France)
- James Lee Byars (US)
- Seyni Awa Camara (Senegal)
- Mike Chukwukelu (Nigeria)
- Francesco Clemente (Italy)
- Marc Couturier (France)
- Tony Cragg (UK)
- Enzo Cucchi (Italy)
- Cleitus Dambi (Papua New Guinea)
- Neil Dawson (New Zealand)
- Baua Devi (India)
- Maestre Didi (Brazil)
- Braco Dimitrijević (Bosnia)
- Nick Dumbrang (Papua New Guinea)
- Efiaimbelo (Madagascar)
- Nathan Emedem (Nigeria)
- John Fundi (Mozambique)
- Julio Galán (Mexico)
- Moshe Gershuni (Israel)
- Enrique Gomez (Panama)
- Dexing Gu (China)
- Hans Haacke (Germany)
- Rebecca Horn (Germany)
- Shirazeh Houshiary (Iran)
- Huang Yong Ping (China)
- Alfredo Jaar (Chile)
- Nera Jambruk (Papua New Guinea)
- Ilya Kabakov (Ukraine)
- Tatsuo Kawaguchi (Japan)
- On Kawara (Japan)
- Anselm Kiefer (Germany)
- Bodys Isek Kingelez (DR Congo)
- Per Kirkeby (Denmark)
- John Knight (US)
- Agbagli Kossi (Togo)
- Barbara Kruger (US)
- Paulosee Kuniliusee (Canada)
- Kane Kwei (Ghana)
- Boujemaâ Lakhdar (Morocco)
- Georges Liautaud (Haiti)
- Felipe Linares (Mexico)
- Richard Long (UK)
- Esther Mahlangu (South Africa)
- Karel Malich (Czech Republic)
- Jivya Soma Mashe (India) *[included in catalog but did not participate in the show]
- John Mawurndjul (Australia)
- Cildo Meireles (Brazil)
- Mario Merz (Italy)
- Miralda (Spain)
- Tatsuo Miyajima (Japan)
- Norval Morrisseau (Canada)
- Juan Muñoz (Spain)
- Henry Munyaradzi (Zimbabwe)
- Claes Oldenburg (Sweden)
- Nam June Paik (South Korea)
- Lobsang Palden (Nepal)
- Wesner Philidor (Haiti)
- Sigmar Polke (Germany)
- Temba Rabden (Tibet) *[included in catalog but did not participate in the show]
- Ronaldo Pereira Rego (Brazil)
- Chéri Samba (DR Congo)
- Sarkis (Turkey)
- Raja Babu Sharma (India)
- Jangarh Singh Shyam (India)
- Bhorda Sherpa (Nepal)
- Nancy Spero (US)
- Daniel Spoerri (Romania)
- Hiroshi Teshigahara (Japan)
- Yousuf Thannoon (Iraq)
- Lobsang Thinle (Nepal)
- Cyprien Tokoudagba (Benin)
- Twins Seven Seven (Nigeria)
- Ulay (Germany)
- Ken Unsworth (Australia)
- Chief Mark Unya (Nigeria)
- Coosje van Bruggen (Netherlands)
- Patrick Vilaire (Haiti)
- Acharya Vyakul (India)
- Jeff Wall (Canada)
- Lawrence Weiner (US)
- Ruedi Wem (Papua New Guinea)
- Krzysztof Wodiczko (Poland)
- Jimmy Wululu (Australia)
- Jack Wunuwun (Australia)
- Yang Jiechang (China)
- (Comunità) Aboriginal community of Yuendumu (Australia)
- Zush (Spain)

== Literature ==
- Magiciens de la Terre, Editions du Centre Pompidou, Paris, 1989. Catalogue of the exhibition with texts by Homi Bhabha, Mark Francis, Pierre Gaudibert, Aline Luque, André Magnin, Bernard Marcadé, Jean-Hubert Martin, Thomas McEvilley, Jacques Soulillou, Adriana Valdés.
- Okwui Enwezor and Olu Oguibe, Introduction. Olu Oguibe and Okwui Enwezor (eds.) Reading the Contemporary. African Art from Theory to the Marketplace, Institute of International Visual Arts (inIVA) and MIT Press, London, 1999, p. 9.
- Clémentine Deliss, Seven Stories About Modern Art in Africa, Flammarion, New York, 1995, p. 14/314 (note 6).
- Pierre Gaudibert, Art africain contemporain, Editions Cercle d'Art, Paris, 1991, p. 16; 17.
- Susan Vogel, Foreword in Africa Explores: 20th Century African Art, p. 12.
- Marie-Laure Bernadac in Africa Remix, Centre Pompidou, Paris, 2005, p. 11.
- "Third Text", Special Issue Magiciens de la Terre: Les Cahiers, n. 6, Spring 1989.
- Roberto Pinto, Nuove geografie artistiche, chapter devoted to Magiciens de la Terre, postmediabooks, 2012, pp. 63–82.
- Lucy Steeds and other authors, Making Art Global: Volume 2: Magiciens de la Terre 1989 (Exhibition Histories), Walther König, Köln, 2013.
- Hannah McGivern, Art Newspaper Vol. 23 Issue 259: The Artists Featured in "Les Magiciens" 25 Years Ago, The Art Newspaper, 2014, p. 37.
