= Gianfranco Baruchello =

Italian painter, poet, and filmmaker (1924–2023)

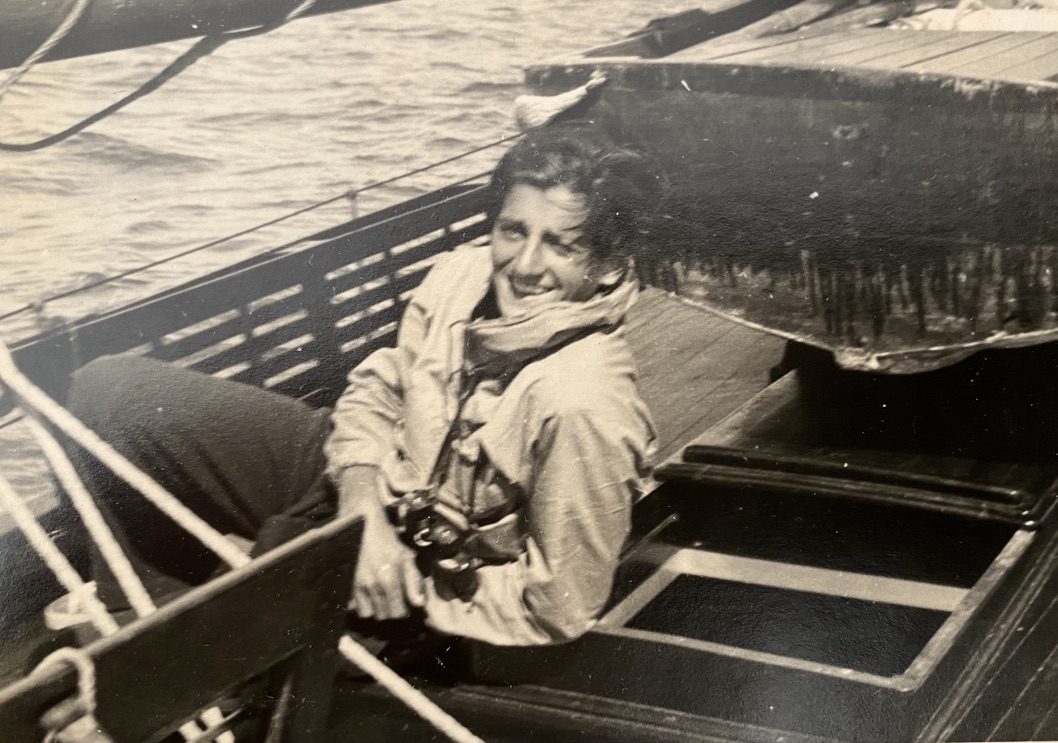
- Born: 29 August 1924; Livorno, Italy
- Died: 14 January 2023 (aged 98); Rome, Italy
- Occupations: Painter; Poet; Filmmaker

Gianfranco Baruchello (29 August 1924 – 14 January 2023) was an Italian painter, poet, and filmmaker.

Born to an elementary school teacher mother and a lawyer father, director of the Livorno Industrial Union, who also taught at the University of Pisa. Following the war, he pursued a degree in law, focusing on economics for his thesis. In 1947, he commenced his professional journey at Bombrini Parodi Delfino. Between 1949 and 1955 he was involved in the creation of the chemical-biological research and production company Società Biomedica. However, in 1959, Baruchello left the company to devote himself to art.

Gianfranco Baruchello began his artistic journey in Paris, where he encountered influential figures like Roberto Matta and, later, Alain Jouffroy in 1962, followed by Marcel Duchamp. His exposure to American art, particularly pop art and abstract expressionism, occurred during his time in New York in 1964, where he met John Cage. These encounters shaped his work, leading to creations like "Other Tracks," characterized by thick black stripes on large white canvases, reflecting American influences. Concurrently, his European roots inspired him to produce objects aligned with Nouveau Réalisme, exemplified by his participation in the New Realists exhibition in 1962 organized by Pierre Restany. Despite engaging with the international avant-garde, Baruchello's artistic exploration remained largely independent. In 1963, he showcased his distinctive style at a solo exhibition at Galleria La Tartaruga in Rome, curated by Jouffroy, featuring fragmented, miniature paintings on expansive white surfaces incorporating symbols of consumerist and television culture.

Gianfranco Baruchello delved into film experimentation in 1960 with his first work, "Molla." Subsequently, he created "Il grado zero del paesaggio" (The Zero Degree of Landscape) in 1963, followed by "Verifica incerta" (Uncertain Verification) in 1964, a collaborative found footage film with Alberto Grifi. For this project, Baruchello purchased a substantial amount of discarded film material from 1950s commercial U.S. cinema and crafted a montage by adhering film clips together with adhesive tape.

Beyond painting and filmmaking, Baruchello explored various creative mediums. From the late 1960s onwards, his artistic pursuits expanded into what Enrico Crispolti termed "extra-media." This encompassed calligraphic painting, object production, literary works, theater, film, videotapes, photography, and agricultural endeavors. Throughout, Baruchello maintained a relentless drive to challenge and subvert the conventions propagated by mass media.

In 1973, Gianfranco Baruchello founded Agricola Cornelia, an agricultural enterprise situated on land purchased that same year on via di Santa Cornelia, on the outskirts of Rome towards Formello. Gradually, the enterprise expanded to cultivate surrounding land, thwarting real estate speculation, with an approach blending artistic happening and political intent. Beyond land acquisition, the endeavor became a reflection on the interplay between agricultural produce, artistic output, and their respective value, echoing Duchampian themes while delving into the materiality of labor and economic principles. This venture, both in name and practice, also inspired a series of paintings and two books: "Agricola Cornelia S.p.a. 1973-1981," cataloging a show at Galleria Milano where Baruchello exhibited artworks intertwined with Agricola Cornelia's experience, and "How to Imagine," a lengthy interview (conducted by Henry Martin) featuring only Baruchello's responses.

By the late 1980s, in the spaces formerly occupied by Agricola Cornelia, Baruchello created "Il Giardino" (The Garden). Presented in 1989 at the Spoleto Festival in "Voci sull'acqua," the project involved the artist tending to a small bonsai of Ginkgo biloba. "Il Giardino" serves as a space for the mind's identification with the earth, trees, and shrubbery.

In 1998, the Baruchello Foundation was established in the artist's former home-studio on Via di Santa Cornelia in the Roman hills.

Curated by Achille Bonito Oliva, the Galleria Nazionale d'Arte Moderna in Rome presented the anthological exhibition "Gianfranco Baruchello: Certain Ideas" in late 2011 and early 2012.

From June to September 2014, a retrospective titled "Gianfranco Baruchello: Certain Ideas Retrospective," curated by Dirk Luckow in collaboration with ZKM Center for Art and Media Karlsruhe, was held. The exhibition subsequently moved to ZKM in November 2014 (November 1, 2014 - March 29, 2015), curated by Andreas Beitin and Peter Weibel. Alongside this exhibition, the catalog "Baruchello: Certain Ideas," edited by Achille Bonito Oliva, Carla Subrizi, Dirk Luckow, Peter Weibel, and Harald Falckenberg, was published by Electa in 2014.

Baruchello died in Rome on 14 January 2023, at the age of 98.

== Filmography ==
- La Verifica incerta (1965)
- Costretto a scomparire (1968)
- Perforce (1968)
- Non accaduto (1969)
- I giorni di Lun (1969)
- Tre lettere a Raymond Roussel (1970)
- Inventario di ottobre 1976 (1977)
- A partire dal Dolce (1980)

== Publications ==
- Mi viene in mente (1967)
- La quindicesima riga (1967)
- Avventure nell'armadio di plexiglass (1968)
- De consolatione picturae (1970)
- Come ho dipinto certi miei quadri (1976)
- Alphabet d'Éros (with Gilbert Lascault, 1976)
- La Stazione del Conte Goluchowsky (1978)
- L’altra casa (1979)
- Agricola Cornelia S.p.A. 1973-81 (1981)
- Monogrammes. Loin du doux (with Jean-François Lyotard, 1982)
- La scomparsa di Amanda Silvers (1982)
- How to imagine. A narrative on art and agriculture (with Henry Martin, 1983)
- Why Duchamp ? An essay on aesthetic impact (with Henry Martin, 1985)
- Bellissimo il giardino (1989)
- Miss Omissis (1991)
- Occhio di pietra (1995)
- 6 poèmes et 8 dessins (1995)
- Quaranta evening in TV (1996)
- Spettacolo di niente (2001)
- Exhibition Catalog, Spettacolo di niente, Editions ArtisticaMente, Roma, 2001. ISBN 88-86584-69-5
