= Jean-Hubert Martin =

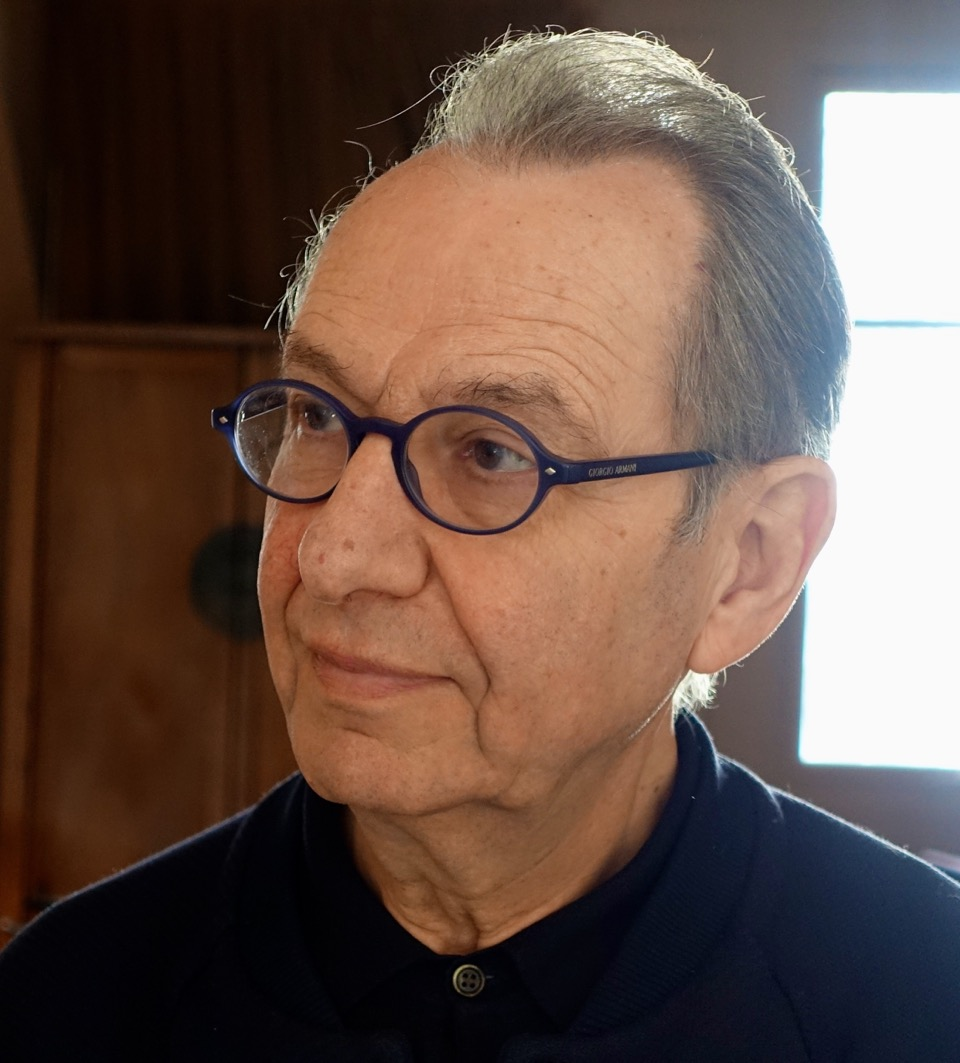
Martin in 2015

Jean-Hubert Martin (French pronunciation: [ʒɑ̃ ybɛʁ maʁtɛ̃]; born 3 June 1944 in Strasbourg) is a leading art historian, institution director, and curator of international exhibitions. Through his professional career, he contributed to expand what is considered as contemporary art as well as create a dialogue between different cultures and ethnic groups.

== Biography ==
Son of Paul Martin, curator of the Historical Museum in Strasbourg (Bas-Rhin region in the French eastern region of Alsace), and of Paulette Rieffel, Jean-Hubert Martin studied at Lycée Fustel de Coulanges in Strasbourg before getting his bachelor's degree in Art History at La Sorbonne in Paris. He received his diploma in 1968 before becoming a curator in the French National Museum system in 1969.

After a short period of working at the Louvre, he started his career in Paris at the Musée National d'Art Moderne (French National Museum of Modern Art) located at the Palais de Tokyo and directed by Jean Leymarie. There, he organized significant exhibitions of Man Ray, Alberto Burri and Richard Lindner. He played a key role in Francis Picabia's revolutionary exhibition in 1976 at the Grand Palais, which showed for the first time his entire work, including his figurative period. Having demonstrated a great interest in the art of the current time, he was named curator of the Contemporary Art department by Pontus Hultén then in charge of the creation of the Centre Pompidou. In this position, he organized exhibitions of the works of Kazimir Malevich, Jean Le Gac and Pierre Molinier as well as "Paris-Berlin" and "Filliou et Pfeufer: La Fondation PoïPoï présente un hommage aux Dogons et aux Rimbauds" (Filliou and Pfeufer: the PoïPoï Foundation pays tribute to the Dogon and the Rimbaud) in 1978, "Paris-Moscou" (Paris-Moscow) in 1979 and Man Ray in 1982.

That same year, he was named curator of the French pavilion at the Sydney Biennale and became director of the Berne Kunsthalle, directed by Harald Szeeman 20 years before. It is the start of his career as director of European institutions: after working at the Berne Kunsthalle (1982–1985), he became director of the National Museum of Modern Art in Paris (1987–1990), artistic director of the Château d'Oiron (1991–1994), director of the National Museum of African and Oceanic Art (1994–1999), general director of the Museum Kunstpalast in Düsseldorf (1999–2006, the museum opened in 2001), and artistic director of the Padiglione d'Arte Contemporanea (PAC), in Milan.

Throughout the course of these experiences, he initiated some important exhibitions which significantly modified museology theory and practice, especially "A Pierre et Marie" (To Pierre and Marie – Curie), a participatory exhibition in 1982/84, "Magiciens de la Terre" (Magicians of the Earth) in 1989, "Art et publicité" (Art and Advertising) in 1990, "Altäre (Autels)" in 2002, "Africa Remix" in 2004. He developed his views in memorable biennales like "Universalis" in São Paulo in 1996 or "Partages d’exotisme" (Exotic Sharing) in Lyon (Rhones-Alpes Region in France) in 2000.

In 2006, he was named Project Manager within the French National Museum system at the Culture and Communication Ministry. He occupied that position until 2010.

Since then, he continues to develop his practice as an independent curator for internationally acclaimed exhibitions: "Dali" at the Centre Georges Pompidou in Paris in 2012, "Theatre du Monde" (Theatre of the World) at the Museum of Old and New Art in Hobart in Tasmania and at the Maison Rouge-foundation Antoine de Galbert in Paris in 2013 and "Le Maroc contemporain" (Contemporary Morocco), at the Institut du Monde Arabe in Paris in 2014.

He also directed the FRAME (French Regional & American Museums Exchange) in France in 2008 and 2009. He is currently president of the SAM award for Contemporary Art selection committee (since 2010), president of the Palais de Tokyo steering committee (since 2011) and president of the artistic, scientific and cultural council at the Cité de la céramique (Ceramic museum) in Sèvres (since 2015).

== Works ==
Born in the heart of Europe and raised in a bicultural environment, Jean-Hubert Martin supported the Europeanization of art, and then its true globalization, exposing artists of the entire world and setting up convincing travelling exhibitions.

After Claude Lévi-Strauss, he recognizes the value of cultures with no writing skills. He looks to develop new lines of inquiry beyond the Western way of thinking. He initiates new exhibition practices creating visual correspondences instead of categories and classifications. This opens new perspectives for institutions and artists alike. In 1989 "Magiciens de la terre" (Magicians of the Earth) is thought to be the first truly international exhibition. For the first time in Europe Western art and art from the Third World were placed at the same level.

In the tradition of the Dada movement, "Magiciens de la terre" (Magicians of the Earth), allowed unknown artists to come to the forefront. Jean-Hubert Martin detects in Dada the first signs of "postmodernism" and of the extension of the idea of art.

Moreover, his research leads to other new perspectives, notably he reactivated the practice of the "cabinet de curiosité", wherein the esthetic pleasure mingles with the scientific interest, for the Château d'Oiron.

Jean-Hubert Martin was a key actor in the discovery of the Russian "avant-gardes" in Europe, especially through the exhibition and publication of the works of Ilya and Emilia Kabakov.

He also brought forward a number of cutting edge French artists from the beginning of their careers, among these: Christian Boltanski, Daniel Buren, Bertrand Lavier, Annette Messager and Sarkis.
