= Tokyo Biennale '70: Between Man and Matter =

Art exhibition

Tokyo Biennale ‘70: Between Man and Matter (Japanese: 第10回日本国際美術展:「人間と物質 」, Hepburn: Dai-10 kai Nihon Hokusai bijutsu-ten: Ningen to busshitsu) opened in May 1970 at the Tokyo Metropolitan Art Museum, and later traveled to Kyoto, Nagoya and Fukuoka. It was the tenth of eighteen international art exhibitions held between 1952 and 1990, sponsored and organised by Mainichi Shimbun, a newspaper with a long history of organising significant art exhibitions. In the history of biennials, Tokyo Biennale '70 marked a shift from the national-representation and prize-awarding model to one that was focused on the forefront developments of contemporary art practice. Specifically, there was a conscious juxtaposition of the latest trends of Post-minimalism and Conceptualism across Euro-America and Japan.

Leading art critic Nakahara Yusuke was selected a commissioner by Minemura Toshiaki at Mainichi to reconceive this edition of the Biennale, eventually settling on the theme of "Between Man and Matter". The Japanese subtitle of the exhibition literally translates as Man and Matter, but Nakahara deliberately chose to phrase it as Between Man and Matter. This reflects Nakahara's interest in exploring the intangibility of the site, or rinjō-shugi (in-situ-ism/on-site-ism). Nakahara had picked this title over other potential titles such as Real and Imaginary and Art of Concept. Minemura, who served as the organizer of the Biennale, had joined the Mainichi Cultural Enterprises Department in 1960, and was the key catalyst of shifting the direction of the Biennale. A large part of his ability to conceive of this new format was due to his own immersion in the contemporary art scene in Paris, where he studied in 1967-8. Minemura chose Nakahara for his background in physics and conceptual mindset, despite his relatively young age (39) for the heavy responsibility of a commissioner.

Tokyo Biennale '70 can be seen as the culmination of Nakahara's art criticism throughout the 1960s alongside his peers Tōno Yoshiaki and Hariu Ichiro (known as the "Big Three" art critics), in which he had actively commented on artist's self-reflexive positionality and affinities to Euro-American practices. He noticed that there was an increasing polarisation in the discussion between ultranationalism [kokusui-shugi] verus ‘abroad’ [kaigai] and ‘international art establishments’ [kokusai gadan], commenting that they were then (1968) in a transitional phase between the former to the latter. He argued that true "internationality" would only emerge when the one no longer contested the existence of the other, and vice versa. Nakahara would then continue working on curatorial projects developing his notion of internationality, namely as the commissioner of the Japanese Pavilion at the 35th (1976) and 36th (1978) Venice Biennale (Tōno and Hariu having commissioned the preceding three iterations).

== Exhibition concept ==
As Nakahara notes in his introduction to the catalogue, the concept of the exhibition was inspired by (then) recent foreign exhibitions: When Attitudes Become Form, curated by Harald Szeemann at Kunsthalle Bern (1969), and Anti-Illusion: Procedures/ Materials held at the Whitney Museum of American Art in the same year. Critical to Nakahara was the prioritisation of the conceptualisation of a work over its final execution.

Nakahara's concept for the Biennale can be understood through his formulation of the museum as a ‘matrix’. The matrix was a place or a situation for man's encounter with art, or matter, rather than just being a nondescript space that surrounds the artwork. The matrix was not neutral, and should be regarded integral aspect of the relationship between man and matter. This is best evidenced through Nakahara's essay in the exhibition catalogue:

As opposed to the work’s basic quality as something closed in and as a totality of form and density, ‘stressing’ the relationship between human and matter, or works as something to be ‘experienced,’ these emphasize circumstance, placement, place, distribution, process, and time. These are necessary in order to produce a situation where humans and matter come in contact. And these are not works that participants simply make in their studios and exhibit it, but directly scout the area and produce work based on what they see. Location too is no longer something abstract but an undeniable ingredient in this contact of human and matter.

This is further explicated by Nakahara's commentary on the Biennale in Bijutsu Techô after its initial showing, focusing specifically on the concept of a life space that does not privilege the art object as sacrosanct material.

It is widely known that a phenomenon that appears to be an integration of art and life became conspicuous in the works exhibited in museum spaces. In other words, by making the non-everyday space of the museum more everyday-like, they let the alienation of “space” happen. . . . I have repeatedly talked about the shift from the work as “thing (mono)” to the work as “space.” Instead of regarding a work-as-object as something that transcends the [surrounding] space, what I have suggested is equating objects with space and granting significance to the relationships between objects and space. Our real lives are like that. In the life space (seikatsu kûkan) in which we live, it is not that various objects exist transcendentally. Our life space where we act exists as their aggregate. In this sense, one can say that the work as “space” is the same as life space in their “structures.”

Kenichi Yoshida has even characterised Nakahara's concept of the matrix to bear affinities to the notion of the total work of art, which could be reflected by how the organizers tracked the process of putting the exhibit together through their own paper documentation. Minemura recorded the trials of the exhibit, as the museum resisted certain works of art because of the space and how some works were refused due the museum’s reluctance to accommodate the request. Since Mainichi's international biennials was usually accompanied by two volumes of catalogue, one for the introduction of artists, the other for the documentation of the exhibited work, Minemura took advantage of it by publishing process documentation and the final installed exhibition. In the first volume, each artist was given free rein to include as many biographical details and images within their assigned pages, resulting in a broad spectrum of plans (be it in actual diagrams, manifestos, inspiration images, sketches and renderings, xerox scans, etc). These details of the construction of the exhibition are meant to be as critically considered as the presence of the artworks in the space themselves.

Thus, Minemura made sure to bring the international artists in to Tokyo so that they should be able to produce their work in the space/matrix, as well as to allow for adaptations of their works in response to the local environment.

Kenichi Yoshida notes that Giuseppe Penone’s Dematerialization of a Room (1970) sought to dislocate space using a series of circular mirror each measuring five centimeters in diameter, placed in various locations from the museum room to Ueno Park where the museum is located. And Michio Horikawa’s work The Nakanomata River Plan-13 consisted of 13 stones picked and mailed to the exhibit with a record of where they were collected. Richard Serra’s piece was simply a tree planted in the park, which would eventually become imperceptible, blending in with the rest of the environment. Okada Takahiko remarked that rather than to conceal, Christo wrapped things in order to generate something that cannot be seen. On Kawara now living in New York was also invited and his Date Paintings hugged the walls of an entire room, neatly organized in almost a minimalist manner, repeating and distending into the infinite space and time; while Matsuzawa Yukata’s piece pointed to the immaterial, pondering the state of death and nonexistence as it played with dichotomy of presence and absence.

In the duration of the exhibition, several of the installations were shifted from their original spaces. The artists whose work was moved include Rinke, Krasinski, Koshimizu, van Elk, Kaltenbach and Panamarenko.

Barbara London has also noted that Tokyo Biennale '70 was the first international exhibition to feature video installations, with a special video section that included Nakaya Fujiko's Statics of an Egg (1973), Yamaguchi Katsuhiro's Las Meninas (1974–75), Yamamoto Keigo's star-tracing game, Komura Masao's junked car, and works buy Wada Morihiro, Kobayashi Hakudō, Matsumoto Shōji, and Shigeko Kubota. However, it appears that this video section was considered separate from the rest of the work-installations, as the aforementioned video artists were not included in the official list of artists, or the catalogues produced.

== Documentation ==
Tokyo Biennale '70 is also notable for the range of photographic documentation available, in most cases produced by practicing artists who experimented in representing the cumulative form of the exhibition in specific aesthetic styles.

Kai Yoshiaki notes that Nakahara's interest in organising the exhibition as a life space (seikatsu kûkan) had strong affinities to the practice of prominent photographers such as Tômatsu Shomei and Moriyama Daido (affiliated with Provoke). Although there appeared to be a divide between photographic practice and the circulation of visual art through major art magazines such as Bijutsu Techô and Geijustu Shinchô in the 1960s and 70s, Ōtsuji Kiyoji's photographic documentation of Tokyo Biennale '70 proved that there were clear intersections within the conceptual and aesthetic interests of Japanese photographers and international contemporary art. Kai characterises Ōtsuji's photographs as unusual as a document of an art exhibition, in which the entire space is central to the composition of the photographs, as compared to a more conventional centering around the artworks. Kai describes the photographed gallery as "vacant", without the "coldness" of modern art museums (with white cube spaces or otherwise)—in other words, without the veneer of austerity and seriousness, rather an ordinary space that is more accessible to the lay person. Ōtsuji also captured several artwork making process photographs, with volunteers executing Sol Lewitt's work, focused on the aesthetics of labour more so than the finished artwork. Kai categorises Ōtsuji's work as "taken using the typical style of konpora photography: the use of a wide lens, horizontal format, a distance from the main subject that enables the photographer to depict its surroundings, and a preference for undramatic moments."

Anzai Shigeo, a painter turned photographer (in the late 1960s) was asked by Nakahara to support several of the exhibiting artists, including Richard Serra, Sol LeWitt and Daniel Buren, in the production of site-specific works. While assisting them, he began photographing the production process and the completed works. Anzai took 4 types of photos, showing artists in the process ofcreating their works, works of art in-situ (close-ups and wide shots), documentations of artists’ performances, artists’ portraits and ‘snap-shot’-like photographs. Anzai's personal relationships to the exhibiting artists and status as a requested photographer is reflected in the proxemical relationship of the camera to the subjects, providing a close and more intimate perspective compared to Ōtsuji. Anzai description of the production process as ‘not going straight to the artwork but keeping a distance’ further contextualises his photographic documentation, position his gaze ‘on the side of the artist’ rather than the object itself.

== Impact ==
While the initial reception of Tokyo Biennale by locals was lukewarm, and the format of this edition of the biennale was not repeated in subsequent years, recent scholarly and curatorial projects have revisited and asserted the importance of the Biennale as an unprecedented platform of international artistic exchange. The works included and exchanges taking place around Tokyo Biennale '70 have been exhibited and contextualised as a significant node in international artistic exchange. Institutions such as Tate Modern have collected several of the works shown in the Biennale, exhibiting them in their permanent collection gallery exhibition "Materials and Objects" (2016–, curated by Mark Godfrey). A symposium about the Biennale was also held in conjunction with the opening of this display, featuring paper presentations by art historian Yohko Watanabe and Susumu Koshimizu, one of the youngest artists who had been included in the exhibition.

Given the intensely collaborative nature of how the works were made and installed in the Tokyo Metropolitan Art Museum space, the exhibition layout and composition has been subject of an ongoing research project at Keio University Art Center. The research center has been endowed with archival materials belonging to Minemura Toshiaki, and produced presentations of exhibition layout renders at "Introduction to Art Archives XIII: Tokyo Biennale '70 Revisited" (at Keio University Art Space, 2016). In 2010, the Museum of Modern Art, New York recreated Edward Krasiński’s installation for the biennale, while in 2014 curator Shinji Kohmoto in collaboration with artist Koki Tanaka organised a two-day workshop at the Kyoto Municipal Museum of Art which included, among other things, a reading of Nakahara’s statement from ‘Between Man and Matter’ and an action with fabrics that related to Christo’s Wrapped Floor installation. Art Historian Lucy Lippard also included the exhibition in her selection of significant shows in her seminal publication Six Years.

Reiko Tomii charts Tokyo Biennale '70 as belonging to a series of large scale exhibitions that promulgated, consolidated and established the formation of groups such as Mono-ha, alongside exhibitions like Biennale de Paris (1969, 1971, 1973), Trends in Contemporary Japanese Art (1970, The National Museum of Modern Art, Kyoto), August 1970: Aspects of New Japanese Art (1970, The National Museum of Modern Art, Tokyo), and Contemporary Art Exhibition of Japan (1971, Tokyo Metropolitan Art Museum, also sponsored by Mainichi Shimbun). This is significantly in contrast with the precedent of establishing artist collectives/groups through self-organised group exhibitions. Tomii also notes that Tokyo Biennale '70 was but the third major exhibition where Japan hosted an "inbound interface" where Japanese art(ists) were able to consider their positionality in relation to the postwar/emerging contemporary Euro-american art world. The first was, “Salon de mai” (1951, Tokyo), featuring modernist paintings from France, and “Éxposition internationalede l’art actuel/Sekai, konnichi no bijutsu-ten” (1956), a seminal presentation of Art Informel in Japan. Tomii also notes that Tokyo Biennale '70s unique mode of not abiding by the selecting criterion of national representation, in the context of an international exhibition, was unprecedented and proposed a viable alternative to the existing Venice and São Paulo biennales, which had already tried to reform themselves. Most importantly, Tomii considers Tokyo Biennale '70 as proving that Japanese artists' practices were on par if not exceeding the innovation of their Euro-American counterparts.

In the months leading up to Tokyo Biennale '70, the concurrent planning of Expo '70 was attracting a lot of resistance from artist-protestors, who were against the nationalistic propaganda evoked through the exponentially developed techno-centric vision of a metropolitan Japan. Soon, the anti-expo sentiment among artists was crystallized into the analogy of Expo '70 participants to war propaganda painters during World War Two. In its July 1969 statement, "Appeal to Artists," Bikyõtõ (short for Bijutsuka Kyõtõ Kaigi, or Artists Joint-Struggle Council) advocated the destruction of every artistic institution that they considered a part of "modern rationalism," including Expo '70 and Tokyo Biennale '70.

== List of exhibited artists ==
This is a list of artists exhibited at Tokyo Biennale '70, according to the exhibition catalogue, Reiko Tomii's article and the Keio University Art Center's research project. Almost half of the artists included in the exhibition had participated the year before in ‘When Attitudes Become Form", an exhibition Nakahara had seen earlier in 1969, which he explicitly references in the exhibition catalogue.

Unlike the preceding editions, Tokyo Biennale '70 was unique in the selection of only 40 artists, whereas previous editions had included anywhere from 233 to 396 artists. Previous editions focused on the competition aspect of the international exhibition, as well as celebrating the best of modern Euro-American art, featuring special displays of Henry Moore, Pablo Picasso, Joan Miró and Alberto Giacometti. There was also a clear division between the domestic Japanese selection of works and the foreign sections.

Of the 28 international artists, 17 of them travelled to Tokyo to adapt and install their work. The artists who were present in Tokyo are marked with an asterix, their city of residence (at the time of the exhibition) included in brackets.

- Dietrich Albrecht (Stuttgart)
- Carl Andre (New York)*
- Boesem Gorinchem (Holland)
- Daniel Buren (Paris)*
- Christo (New York)*
- Jan Dibbets (Amsterdam)
- Ger van Elk (Amsterdam)*
- Enokura Köji (Tokyo)*
- Luciano Fabro (Milan)
- Barry Flanagan (London)*
- Hans Haacke (New York)*
- Horikawa Michio (Niigata)*
- Inumaki Kenji (Osaka)*
- Stephen J. Kaltenback (New York)
- Kawaguchi Tatsuo (Kobe)*
- On Kawara (New York)
- Koike Kazushige (Shizuoka)*
- Stanislav Kolibal (Prague)
- Koshimizu Susumu (Yokohama)*
- Jannis Kounellis (Rome)*
- Edward Krasinski (Warsaw)
- Sol LeWitt (New York)*
- Roelof Rouw (London)*
- Matsuzawa Yutaka (Shimosuwa)*
- Mario Merz (Turin)*
- Narita Katsuhiko (Tokyo)*
- Bruce Nauman (Pasadena)
- Nomura Hitoshi (Kyoto)*
- Panamarenko (Antwerp)*
- Giuseppe Penone (Turin)*
- Markus Raetz (Amsterdam)
- Klaus Rinke (Düsseldorf)*
- Reinber Ruthenbeck (Düsseldorf)*
- Jean Frédéric Schnyder (Bern)
- Richard Serra (New York)*
- Shõji Satoru (Nagoya)*
- Keith Sonnier (New York)*
- Takamatsu Jirõ (Tokyo)*
- Tanaka Shintarö (Hitachi)*
- Gilberto Zorio (Turin)*
- K.G. Subramanyan (India)
- N. S. Bendre (India)
- Jayant Parikh (India)
- Jyoti Bhatt (India)
- Shanti Dave (India)
