= Yusuke Nakahara =

Japanese art critic

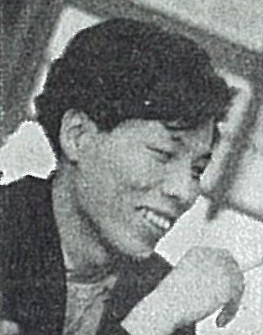
- Nakahara c. 1961
- Born: August 22, 1931; Kobe, Hyogo, Japan
- Died: March 3, 2011 (aged 79); Tokyo, Japan
- Education: Kyoto University
- Occupations: Art Critic and Curator
- Years active: 1955–2011
- Known for: Tokyo Biennale '70, Between Man and Matter

Yusuke Nakahara (August 22, 1931 – March 3, 2011) was a Japanese art critic, curator, scholar, lecturer, university president, art festival organizer, and cultural administrator.

He is perhaps best known as the figure who spearheaded the influential 1970 Tokyo Biennale, Between Man and Matter at the Tokyo Metropolitan Art Museum. The exhibition was a watershed moment in Post-1945 Japanese art for its promotion of avant-garde Japanese and international art practices as demonstrated by disparate artists who worked in varying mediums within the then-underrepresented movements of Arte Povera, Conceptual Art, Minimalism, and Mono-ha. The exhibition is seen as a reaction against the concurrent Expo ‘70 in Osaka for embodying the attributes of Japan's Post-World War II economic resurgence and ascension to major world status.

Nakahara was a prolific writer in the Japanese art world as he published innumerable exhibition reviews, books, academic essays, magazine articles, and chapters. His writings have appeared in journals such as Bijutsu Techo, Mizue, and Geijutsu Shincho.

Originally trained as a physicist, Nakahara's approach to art criticism and curation was grounded more in scientific methodologies than art historical pedagogy based on his frequent incorporation of references to human perception, physical spatiality, and kinetics, among other theoretical ideas.

Since his passing in 2011, contemporary Art historians and critics consider Nakahara a significant figure in Post-1945 Japanese art history and is likened to other critics of his generation, including Ichiro Haryu, Yoshiaki Tono, and Shinichi Segi.

== Early life and education ==
Nakahara was born on August 22, 1931, in Kobe, Hyogo, Japan.

In the early 1950s, Nakahara graduated from Kyoto University's Faculty of Science where he studied theoretical physics. During and after his studies, he worked in the laboratories of Kyoto University's Division of Physics and Astronomy as a researcher under the supervision of Hideki Yukawa, a physicist who became Japan's first Nobel Laureate.

== Early career ==
In 1955, Nakahara penned his first piece of art criticism that coincided with his research on theoretical physics, "Criticism for creation". The text operates as both a work on art theory and the physical sciences as he expresses disapproval for both the emerging field of cybernetics and the emphasis placed on mechanization as signifiers of scientific and civilization's progress. Contextually, Nakahara's research occurred during an increasing interest in Japanese academia and politics to invest more money and resources into the study of atomic energy and nuclear reactor technology. Colleagues of Nakahara commented in recent years that this text likey demarcated the reasons for why Nakahara shifted his career from the Sciences to the Arts.

"Criticism for creation" was submitted in an open essay contest sponsored by the art magazine Bijutsu Hihyo (Art Criticism), to which he won first prize and attained employment as a writer for the magazine. Nakahara's sudden acceptance into art criticism was a major turning point as Bijutsu Hihyo was a subsidiary of the arts publishing house Bijutsu Shuppansha, which distributed the equally influential Bijutsu Techo (Art Notebook) and Mizue (Watercolor).

In his early writing career from the mid-1950s to the early-1960s, Nakahara wrote extensively on avant-garde Japanese artists and movements, including On Kawara, Anti-Art, and Surrealism.

Subsequently, Nakahara began to curate exhibitions of Japanese and international artists. He placed emphasis on creatives who worked along the periphery of the Japanese art world and were affiliated with avant-garde movements and styles.

Rooms in Alibi: Gentle Criminals was a group exhibition that marked the opening of the Naiqua Gallery in Shinbashi, Tokyo in 1963. With ten participating artists, the exhibition displayed furniture and related domestic items to subtly critique the power and influence of commodity systems and consumerism on Japanese home life. The Conceptualist Genpei Akasegawa and members of the Hi-Red Center were among the artists who featured works in the exhibition.

Recognized as a major proponent of the latest developments in Japanese avant-garde art of the 1960s, Nakahara was simultaneously intent on the promotion and exhibition of international artists who also worked in non-traditional mediums and styles. Solo exhibitions of rising global artists such as the German painter Hans Richter (1966) and the Italian ZERO movement painter Enrico Castellani (1968) at The Tokyo Gallery introduced Japanese spectators to contemporaneous trends in global Modern Art.

In 1968, Nakahara partnered with fellow art critic Junzo Ishiko in the curation of the group exhibition Tricks and Visions, which featured 19 artists between two galleries (The Tokyo Gallery and Muramatsu Gallery). Like Nakahara, Ishiko expressed a deep fascination for non-mainstream media as diverse as gadgets and kitsch works. The exhibition addressed the lack of attention surrounding the little studied sub-movement of "tricky art", a style and idea that examines the nature of sight and its susceptibility to encounter visual tricks. Works on view engaged with the relationship between optical illusions and perception via mirrors, trompe l'oeil, and visual distortions. An eclectic range of artists participated to underscore the frequency of "tricky art" across mediums: Jiro Takamatsu, Nobuo Sekine, Yoshinori Suzuki, et al.

== Mid-career (1970–1995) ==
1970 marked an important year for Japanese art as the Expo ‘70 world's fair was held in Osaka to commemorate Japan's Post-World War II exponential economic recovery and rise to major global power status. Although the fair attracted a record-breaking attendance of 64 million people to witness the modern technological, artistic, and cultural marvels of 77 countries (including Japan), Nakahara's organization of the 10th Tokyo Biennale, Between Man and Matter, is perceived as a reaction against Expo ‘70.

He described the concept behind the exhibition as an exploration of how "man and matter [are joined] together inseparably with mutual influences and control". By applying his background in theoretical physics, Nakahara centered the exhibition around how objects and people interact with one another in a physical space. Since it was held at the Tokyo Metropolitan Art Museum, Nakahara deemed it imperative for the museum itself to be an integral component in the display of the artworks. These site specific pieces purposefully engaged with the structural parameters of the museum's gallery spaces and encouraged audience interactions. For example, Takamatsu's Thirty-six Oneness is a sculptural assemblage of cedar logs stacked atop one another in a columnar composition to signify the materiality of the wood. In another example, the French environmental artist Christo blanketed a massive gallery space in fabric that entailed collaboration between the artist and his team of assistants.

In defiance of traditional art festival regulations, no juried prizes were awarded and an international pool of artists chosen to participate not as representatives of their respective countries, but for their individualized artistry. Of the 40 artists, 13 of whom were native Japanese while the rest hailed from the United States and Europe. The participating artists comprised established figures and future luminaries: Hans Haacke, Bruce Nauman, Jiro Takamatsu, Richard Serra, Hitoshi Nomura, Mario Merz, et al.

Due to the ephemerality of the predominantly site specific works, Nakahara commissioned photographer Shigeo Anzai to document the entirety of the exhibition for the sake of photographic preservation.

Following Between Man and Matter, Nakahara was invited to oversee and manage the Japanese pavilions at multiple international art festivals throughout the 1970s. Of note, he led the Japanese pavilions at two São Paulo (1973 and 1975) and two Venice Biennales (1976 and 1978).

Nakahara's interest in non-Japanese artists extended into mainland Asia, particularly South Korea. In 1972, Nakahara and his colleagues Yoshishige Saito and Jiro Takamatsu visited South Korea to discover novel approaches to art production that were unique from his previous engagements with Japanese, European, and American artists. He grew enamored with the indigenous movement Dansaekhwa (also spelled as Tansaekhwa), which is a form of monochromatic painting that sought to strip Korean art of any references to Western and Japanese painterly influences. Canvases are absent of any representational figures and they are predominantly occupied with swaths of colorfully abstract brushstrokes and wide planes of solid hues. Derived from traditional Korean ink painting techniques, Dansaekhwa practitioners were interested in the themes of tactility, performance, and spirit as it relates to the physicality of the painted surface. Impressed by the works of Wong Young-Woo, Park Seo-bo, Sun Seung-Won, Hur Hwang, and Lee Dong-Youb, Nakahara exhibited their paintings in Five Korean Artists, Five Kinds of White at The Tokyo Gallery in May 1975. Five Korean Artists was pivotal as the first exhibition of Korean art in Japan and for its focus on a unique form of monochromatic painting. Although Dansaekhwa was not a formally organized art movement but a stylistic trend, it exposed the art world to this once-obscure art style and revealed the creative advancements underway in the Korean Peninsula.

Nakahara briefly served an administrative role as the President of Kyoto Seika University from 1979 - 1981. Founded in 1968, Kyoto Seika's specialization as an Arts university perfectly complemented Nakahara's interest in cutting-edge contemporary art practices given the institution's breadth of programs in Visual Arts, Design, Manga, and Popular Culture.

From 1982 to 1995, Nakahara directed the curation of multiple exhibitions at the Ginza-based LIXIL Gallery whose prominent reputation is grounded in the display of innovative art and architectural designs that blend Japanese craftsmanship with contemporary home aesthetics.

Upon the opening of the contemporary museum Art Tower Mito in 1990, Nakahara supervised the execution of a groundbreaking exhibition that foreshadowed a rising generation of Japanese artists that would further redefine the art of the 1990s, The Game of Manners - Japanese Art in 1990. The artists in view included Yo Akiyama, Mika Yoshizawa, and Shigeru Nishina.

== Later career ==
For the remainder of his career, Nakahara was regularly invited as a lecturer and panelist to numerous museum and gallery exhibitions.

On April 1, 2006, Nakahara was appointed as the Director of the Hyogo Prefectural Museum of Art; he held this position until his retirement on March 31, 2010. Immediately after his tenure ended, Nakahara was appointed as an Emeritus Director.

Beginning in 2000, Nakahara was one of the founding commissioners of the international art festival Echigo-Tsumari Art Triennale (ETAT). Held every three years in Japan's Niigata region, the festival attracts hundreds of Japanese and international artists to exhibit works that reflect the concept of satoyama (the convergence of people and nature) via environmentally-conscious art and designs.

== Death ==
Nakahara died on March 3, 2011, at 79 from complications related to gallbladder cancer. Until his passing, he held the title of Honorary Director at the Hyogo Prefectural Museum of Art.

== Legacy ==
In recognition of his role as an advisor of the Echigo-Tsumari Art Triennale, the festival organized an exhibition to commemorate Nakahara's contributions to Post-1945 Japanese art history and artistic production. Unveiled in 2012, Nakahara Yusuke Cosmology is a site-specific sculptural installation that reflects the late critic's expansive academic and artistic interests. His over 30,000 book collection is assembled within hundreds of shelves that form a tower-like structure that could be viewed and traversed from both outside and inside the constructed design.

Although Between Man and Matter received mixed reviews from critics in 1970, today's scholars and critics have revisited the exhibition and acknowledged its historical significance in addressing the proliferation of disparate art modes within Japan, Europe, and the United States. Since 2016, Tate Modern possesses multiple works from the 1970 Tokyo Biennale and have them on view in their permanent collection exhibition Materials and Objects.

Because of the breadth of creative representation at Between Man and Matter, one of Nakahara's most important long-term contributions to Modern & Contemporary art history was the legitimation of a slew of art movements and styles: Mono-ha, Conceptualism, Arte Povera, Minimalism & Post-Minimalism, Installation Art.

== Select exhibitions curated ==
- 1961: Contemporary Vision - Sato Gallery
- 1966: Hans Richter - The Tokyo Gallery, Tokyo, Japan
- 1968: Tricks and Visions - Muramatsu Gallery and The Tokyo Gallery, Tokyo, Japan
- 1970: Between Man and Matter - 1970 Tokyo Biennale, Tokyo, Japan
- 1973: São Paulo Biennale - São Paulo, Brazil
- 1975: São Paulo Biennale - São Paulo, Brazil
- 1975: Five Korean Artists, Five Kinds of White - The Tokyo Gallery, Toko, Japan
- 1976: Venice Biennale - Venice, Italy
- 1977: Korea: Facet of Contemporary Art - Tokyo Central Museum of Art, Tokyo, Japan
- 1978: Venice Biennale - Venice, Italy
- 1980: Contemporary Korean Painting
- 1984: Picabia - Seibu Museum of Art, Tokyo, Japan

== Select publications ==
=== Books ===
- 1962: Aesthetics of Nonsense
- 1966: Hans Richter
- 1970: Tokyo Biennale ‘70: Between Man and Matter
- 1976: Kishio Suga
- 1977: Contemporary Sculpture
- 1981: Introduction to Contemporary Art
- 1982: Art and Revolution 1910 - 1932
- 1983: Kurt Schwitters
- 1984: Picabia
- 1984: Christo: Works 1958 - 83
- 1985: The Myth of Seeing
- 1986: Brancusi
- 1987: Gerard Titus-Carmel
- 1991: Shingu: Rhythm of Nature
- 1992: Hiroshi Teshigahara

=== Book chapters ===
- 1968: "The 8th Contemporary Art Exhibition of Japan", in The 8th Contemporary Art Exhibition of Japan (Tokyo: Mainichi Newspapers)
- 1974: "Publisher's Forward", in Art in Japan Today (Tokyo: Kinokuniya Book-Store Co for Japan Foundation)
- 1975: "Five Korean Artists, Five [Kinds of] White", in Five Kinds of White (Tokyo: Tokyo Gallery)
- 1978: "The Paintings of Park Seobo", in Park Seobo (Tokyo: Tokyo Gallery)
- 1984: "Japanese Contemporary Art and Its Milieu: Focusing on the Seventies", in Art in Japan Today II: 1970 - 1983 (Tokyo: Japan Foundation)
- 1990: "On the Question of the Position in Contemporary Art", in The Game of Manners: Japanese Art in 1990 (Mito: The Art Tower Mito)
- 2000: "Portents of a Restoration in the Arts", in Echigo-Tsumari Art Triennial, exhibition catalogue (Tokyo: Art Front Gallery): 11 - 13

=== Scholarly articles ===
- 1955: "Modern Myth" - Bijutsu Hihyo (October 1955)
- 1956: "Pictures of Locked Rooms" - Bijutsu Techo (June 1956)
- 1957: "Postwar Ten Years' Art" - Mizue 626 (September 1957)
- 1964: "Kawara On's Two Series" - Bijutsu Techo 240 (August 1964)
- 1966: "Imitation pointed out at Contemporary Art Exhibition of Japan" - Geijutsu Shincho (July 1966)
- 1967: "Environmentalization of Art and Environment Turning into Art" - Bijutsu Techo (July 1967)
- 1970: "Contact of Man and Matter: Avoiding Concentration of Trends" - Bijutsu Techo 328 (June 1970)
- 1977: "A group that appeals to contemporary art - on the exhibition ‘Korea: Facet of Contemporary Art'" - Bijutsu Techo (September 1977)
- 1981: "Kawara's Early Two Series" - Gendi-no Me (Eye of the Modern) (July 1981)
- 1982: "Up in the air and down on the ground: A grand media sight of people's profiles" - Bijutsu Techo (Co-authored with Katsuhiro Yamaguchi) (January 1982)
- 1983: "Pursuing a present-like image of the whole" - Space 195 (September 1983)
- 1990: "The framework of international exhibitions" - Bijutsu Techo (Co-authored with Kunio Yaguchi and Tadayasu Sakai) (July 1990)

== Select lectures ==
- 1991: "Art in the Future" - N and A Inc.
- 1999: "Ilya Kabakov: Life and Creativity of Charles Rosenthal" - Art Tower Mito
- 2003: "Symposium: The Activities of E.A.T." - NTT InterCommunication Center
- 2010: "The Shape of the Art Museum of the Future" - Benesse House, Naoshima
- 2010: "Art and Technology in Postwar Japan" - The Museum of Modern Art, Kamakura & Hayama
