= Ernest Pignon-Ernest =

French artist (born 1942)

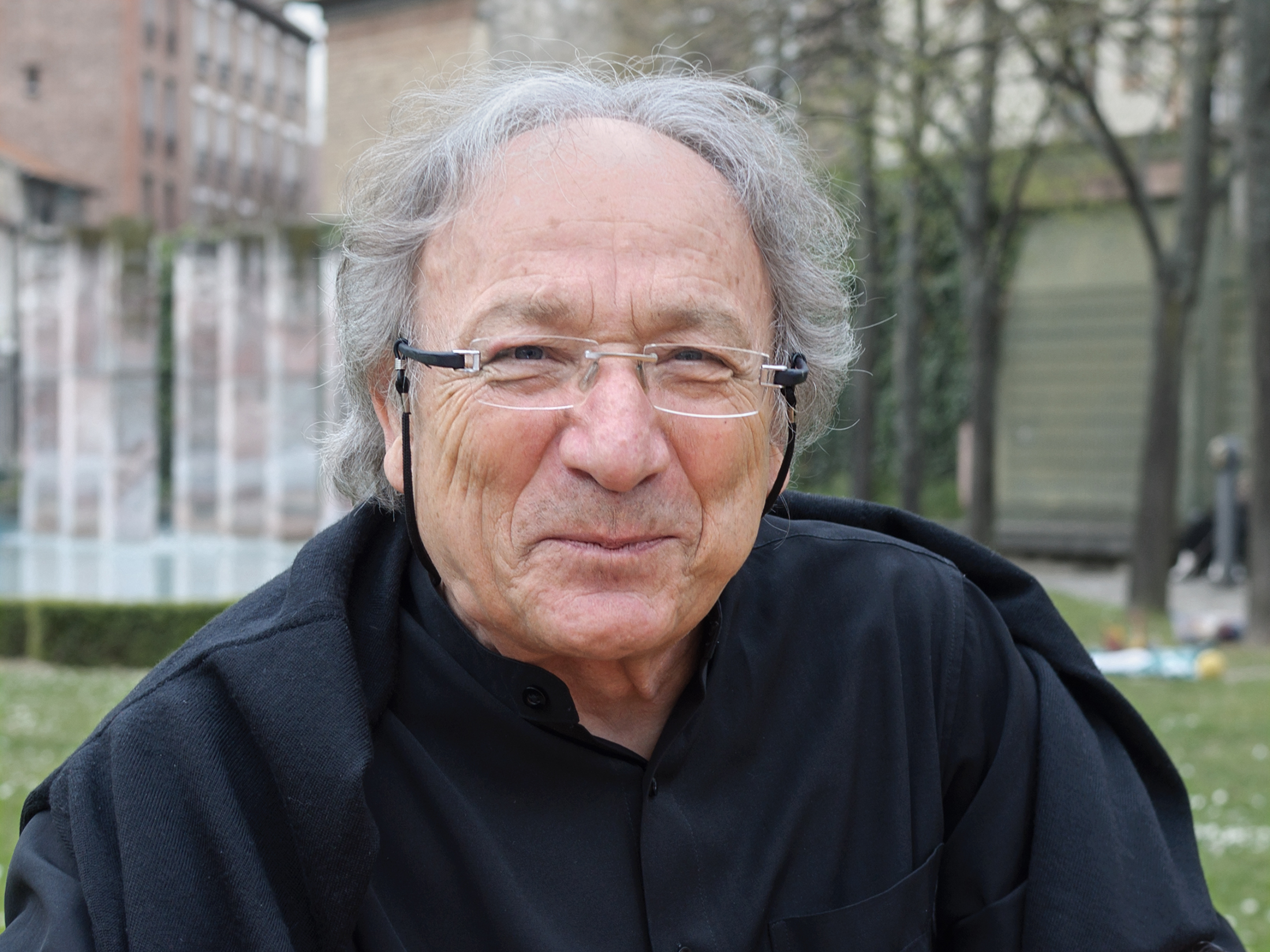
Pignon-Ernest in 2014

Ernest Pignon-Ernest (born 1942) is a Fluxus and Situationist French artist, born in Nice.

== Overview ==
His first work was completed in 1966. It was a reaction to France's Nuclear Strike Force. In 1971, he exhibited posters depicting scenes from the Commune. In 1978–1979, his posters of Arthur Rimbaud could be seen all over France. In 1988–1990, he made drawings of Naples. In 1996, he initiated the collection of international artwork called Art Against Apartheid alongside Antonio Saura.

Pignon-Ernest's posters are in the collection of the Center for the Study of Political Graphics.

Pignon-Ernest joined the General Confederation of Labour (CGT), one of the main labour unions in France. With Henri Cueco, he co-founded the Syndicat national des artistes plasticiens CGT.
