= Pierre Gaudibert =

- Born: 3 March 1928; Paris, France
- Died: 17 January 2006 (aged 77); Paris, France
- Occupations: Art curator and critic

Pierre Gaudibert (3 March 1928 – 17 January 2006) was a French art curator and critic. He was the inaugural curator of the contemporary art section at the Musée d'Art Moderne de la Ville de Paris, where he exhibited left-wing artists. He was also the curator of the Museum of Grenoble and the Musée national des Arts d'Afrique et d'Océanie. He was the author of eight books about art and culture.

== Early life ==
Pierre Gaudibert was born on 3 March 1928 in Paris. He studied art history at university.

== Career ==
Gaudibert began his career at the Musée d'Art Moderne de la Ville de Paris in 1966, where he became associated with "narrative figuration". In 1967, he curated a section for contemporary art known as Animation-Recherche-Confrontation. His first exhibition, held in June 1967, was prefaced by art critic Gérald Gassiot-Talabot. In January 1969, he curated an exhibition about the Vietnam War called "The Red Room". In February 1969, he exhibited Jean Dewasne's La Longue Marche, a painting about the Chinese Communist Revolution. In 1970, he exhibited the works of Vlassis Caniaris, a critique of the Greek military junta of 1967–74. He subsequently exhibited Gérard Fromanger's Le Rouge, a collection of blood-soaked flags. He left the museum in 1972 after he criticised President Georges Pompidou, and he was succeeded by Suzanne Pagé.

Gaudibert founded Le Magasin, an art gallery in Grenoble. He also curated the Museum of Grenoble, where he removed all gilded frames. He subsequently curated the Musée national des Arts d'Afrique et d'Océanie in Paris. He curated an exhibition about Haitian paintings in 1991. He was the author of several books, one of which he co-authored with the painter Henri Cueco.

Gaudibert was associated with Peuples et Cultures, a Third-Worldist non-profit organization. He was friends with Louis Althusser, Gilles Deleuze and Félix Guattari. He was morally opposed to wearing a tie.

== Death ==
Gaudibert died on 17 January 2006 in Paris.

== Works ==
- Gaudibert, Pierre (1970). Ingres. Paris: Flammarion. OCLC 741434100.
- Gaudibert, Pierre (1971). Musées d'art moderne ou musées comportant une section importante d'art moderne. Paris: Peuple et culture. OCLC 25838041.
- Gaudibert, Pierre (1973). De l'ordre moral. Paris: Grasset. OCLC 963254115.
- Gaudibert, Pierre (1977). Action culturelle : intégration et/ou subversion. Tournai: Casterman. ISBN 9782203231184. OCLC 950189211.
- Gaudibert, Pierre (1981). Du culturel au sacré. Tournai: Casterman. ISBN 9782203231740. OCLC 797224420.
- Cueco, Henri; Gaudibert, Pierre (1988). L'Arène de l'art. Paris: Galilée. ISBN 9782718603261. OCLC 958966571.
- Gaudibert, Pierre (1989). Ipoustéguy. Paris: Editions Cercle d'Art. ISBN 9782702202463. OCLC 243715066.
- Gaudibert, Pierre (1994). L'art africain contemporain. Paris: Diagonales. ISBN 9782702203873. OCLC 963448714.
