= Saburo Muraoka =

Japanese modern and contemporary artist

Saburō Muraoka ( 村岡三郎, Muraoka Saburō, 25 June 1928 – 3 July 2013) was a Japanese modern and contemporary artist born in Osaka.

== Career ==
Known primarily as a sculptor, Muraoka first received artistic recognition in 1949 as a student at the Osaka City Art Institute (大阪市立美術研究所), a school associated with Osaka City Museum of Fine Arts, with his plaster bust "Neck." With this work he received the second Osaka Mayor prize while exhibited at the annual Osaka City Exhibition. He became affiliated with the Nika Society (二科会) in 1950 and showed in the annual Nika Exhibition from 1950 until 1969 when he withdrew from the Society. At a young age he became fascinated by astronomy, an interest that would turn into an ongoing engagement with the sciences in his artistic practice. His experiences as a youth during and after the Second World War, during which his brother died in Manchuria, also influenced his decision to become an artist. He is known for his use of unusual materials such as iron, sulfur, salt, and oxygen tanks, as well for his aesthetic engagement with dynamic qualities like heat, vibration, and decay to capture "the delicate equilibrium of both life-forming and destructive natural forces." An early example of Muraoka's artistic approach of manipulating states of matter is his "July 1954" (1954) for which he is credited with producing the first welded sculpture in Japan. This work is now a part of the permanent collection at the National Museum of Modern Art, Tokyo.

The overlap of art and theoretical questions of the sciences was an interest he shared with Yutaka Matsuzawa, with whom he once collaborated. He was also acquainted with Gutai Art Association founder Jiro Yoshihara, who invited him to participate in Gutai activities in 1961. Muraoka attended a meeting at Yoshihara’s house but felt uncomfortable and did not participate beyond that.

Despite Muraoka’s primary reputation in sculpture, his practice spanned many different media over his career and particularly during the 1970s when he experimented with photography, drawing, video and audio. Many projects could be considered intermedia as well, such as his 1972 work "棒 " (“Stick”), a video installation work that complicated the categories of sculpture and film through a projection of an object onto the object itself. This work was presented in the 5th Exhibition of Contemporary Plastic Art: Expression in Film ’72—Thing. Place. Time. Space: Equivalent Cinema in 1972 at the Kyoto Municipal Museum of Art. Another example of Muraoka working between media is "This Accidental Co-Action as an Incident," also in 1972. Working collaboratively with Norio Imai and Tōru Kuranuki, recordings of the artists’ heartbeats were played from the roof of a building onto an Osaka street for ten days to intersperse with the noise of the public. This audio work was editioned in 2019 by Art & Space Cococara and Japanese Art Sound Archive. His 1973 collaborative video work with Tatsuo Kawaguchi and Keiji Uematsu, "Image of Image-Seeing", also experimented with methods of public dissemination, originally premiering on the NHK broadcasting station's "Hyōgo no jikan" (Hyōgo Hours) television program. This work was included in Electronic Arts Intermix’s DVD anthology and catalog publication "Vital Signs: Early Japanese Video Art" in 2010. Much of Muraoka's video work is archived at Electronic Arts Intermix in New York City.

Muraoka was a professor at Kansai Women's Art Junior College until 1981. From 1981 to 1993 he was a faculty member at Shiga University, after which he was a professor at Kyoto Seika University from 1993 to 2002. In 1965 he received the K Award at the "1st Contemporary Japanese Sculpture Exhibition" in Ube, Yamaguchi. He also won the 40th Mainichi Art Award in 1999. His work “Negative Copper Coin” (1973), appeared on the cover of the November 1973 issue of Bijutsu Techō magazine. For this piece Muraoka rubbed two 10 yen coins with his hands to gradually wear away the symbolic information and return the objects to their mere material. Notable exhibitions include "Saburo Muraoka: Salt/Heat/Oxygen", a retrospective at the National Museum of Modern Art, Tokyo in 1997 (which subsequently traveled to The National Museum of Modern Art, Kyoto in 1998) and the 44th Venice Biennale Japan pavilion, which he shared with Toshikatsu Endō in 1990. His work is in the permanent collections of Toyota Municipal Museum of Art and the Shiga Prefectural Museum of Modern Art among others.
