= Marinette Cueco =

French plastic artist (1934–2023)

- Born: 27 September 1934; Argentat, France
- Died: 18 October 2023 (aged 89); Paris, France
- Occupation: Plastic artist

Marinette Cueco (27 September 1934 – 18 October 2023) was a French plastic artist. She was also known for her creations using plants and minerals.

== Biography ==
Marinette Cueco was born on 27 September 1934. She was a visual artist with great sensitivity to the world of plants. She also worked with herbs, creating openwork fabrics with random, yet simple and geometric shapes. She also used combined textures and colors to create mineral and plant formations.

Cueco was the wife of painter Henri Cueco, with whom she had two children: Pablo and David. Marinette Cueco died on 18 October 2023 at the age of 89. Cueco died on 18 October 2023, at the age of 89.

== Distinctions ==
- Officer of the Ordres des Arts et des Lettres (2022)

== Exhibitions ==
- Musée d'Art Moderne de Paris (1986)
- Musée départemental d'Art contemporain de Rochechouart (1987)
- Centre d'art contemporain de Meymac (1988)
- Barbican Centre (1989)
- Les imaginaires du Mont Saint-Michel (1992)
- Grandes serres du Jardin des plantes (1999)
- Collégiale Saint-André de Chartres (1999)
- Château du Grand Jardin (2004)
- Centre d'art contemporain de Meymac (2005)
- Musée des Beaux-Arts de Pau (2006)
- Musée de Soissons (2007)
- Espace d'art contemporain (2011)
- Galerie Univer/Colette Colla (2014/2015)
- Galerie Univer/Colette Colla (2017)
- Fondation Villa Datris (2019)
- Galerie Univer/Colette Colla (2019)
- Centre d'art contemporain de Châteauvert (2020)
- Domaine de Chaumont-sur-Loire (2020)
- Jardins de Salagon (2021)
- LAAC Museum of Contemporary Art (2021)
- Musée de l'Hospice Saint-Roch (2022)
- Musée d'art moderne et d'art contemporain (2023)
- Palais Idéal (2023)
- Les Abattoirs, Musée - Frac Occitanie Toulouse (2023)
- Galerie Univer/Colette Colla (2023)

== Publications ==
- Herbailles, petits herbiers de circonstance, in 11 volumes:
  - Les Sempervirens (2003)
  - Gwemon, warec, alga (2005)
  - Toxiques et héroïques (2006)
  - La Tourbière du Longeyroux (2006)
  - Voyageurs immobiles (2006)
  - Les Herbes de la Saint Jean (2007)
  - Le Jardin du docteur Gachet (2008)
  - Plantes à couleurs (2011)
  - Pétales de consolation (2019)
  - Bris et Débris (2021)
  - Rhizomes et voltiges (2022)
- Marinette Cueco. Herbes (2022)
- Ne se perd ni ne meurt (2023)
- À fleurs de peau (2023)
