= Henri Cueco =

French writer, painter and radio personality (1929-2017)

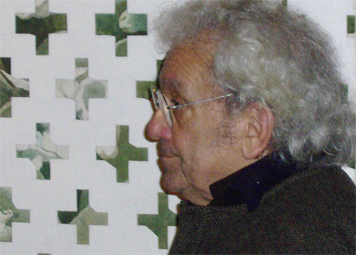
- Born: 19 October 1929; Uzerche, Corrèze, France
- Died: 13 March 2017 (aged 87); Paris, France
- Occupations: Painter, essayist, novelist, radio personality
- Political party: French Communist Party (1956–1976)
- Spouse: Marinette Cueco

Henri Cueco (19 October 1929 – 13 March 2017) was a French painter, essayist, novelist and radio personality. As a self-taught painter, his work was exhibited internationally. He was the author of several books, including collections of essays and novels. He was also a contributor to France Culture. A communist-turned-libertarian, he was a co-founder of Coopérative des Malassis, an anti-consumerist artists' collective. He was best known for The Red Men, a series of figurative paintings depicting aspects of the Cold War like the May 1968 events, the Vietnam War and Red Scare, and his 150 still lifes, or "portraits," of potatoes.

== Early life ==
Henri Cueco was born on 19 October 1929 in Uzerche, Corrèze, a rural part of France. His father, Vicente Cueco, was an immigrant from Spain and his mother was French. He was essentially self-taught, though his father also taught him how to paint from the age of 13.

== Career ==
Cueco began his career as a landscape painter in the 1950s. He became a figurative painter, associated with the school of Nouvelle figuration in 1960s. His artwork was political, and he was a critic of materialism and minimalism. He did paintings of hunting dogs and snakes, followed by 150 still lifes, or "portraits," of potatoes.

In 1969–1970, Cueco co-founded an artists collective called Coopérative des Malassis with Lucien Fleury, Jean-Claude Latil, Michel Parré and Gérard Tisserand. Together, they designed a politically satirical fresco called Le Grand Méchoui in 1972. They designed Qui tue ? ou l’affaire Gabrielle Russier in 1973. They also designed Radeau de la Méduse ou la Dérive de la société, a decor on consumerism in the Grand'Place, Grenoble, in 1973–1975. They designed Les affaires reprennent in 1977.

His work was first exhibited at the Salon de la Jeune peinture, followed by the Atelier populaire. In 1970, he exhibited The Red Men, a series of paintings on the Cold War (including the May 1968 events, the Vietnam War and the Red Scare), at the Musée d'Art Moderne de la Ville de Paris. In 1986, when he exhibited an irreverent portrait of Karl Marx, Sigmund Freud and Mao Zedong in Beijing, China, he was asked to take it down. The painting included the following quotation by Henri Jeanson: "Capitalism is the exploitation of men by men. Communism? It is the opposite."

In 1997, Cueco exhibited paintings inspired by Nicolas Poussin and Philippe de Champaigne at the Centre d'art contemporain in Meymac. In 2010, he exhibited nudes in the manner of Ingres at the Musée Ingres in Montauban. He exhibited his work at the Musée d'art et d'archéologie du Périgord in 2014, when he was the guest of honour at the Expoésie Festival. His last exhibition was held at La Maison Rouge in February 2017.

Cueco was the founder of the Association Pays Paysage in Uzerche. He was a contributor to the French radio station France Culture, especially its programmes called Les Papous dans la tête and Les Décraqués. He was the author of several books, including novels and collections of essays. One of his novels was made into a 2007 film directed by Jean Becker, Conversations with My Gardener.

Cueco was an avid reader of Marxist texts. He was member of the French Communist Party from 1956 to 1976. He also joined the General Confederation of Labour (CGT), one of the main labour unions in France. With Ernest Pignon-Ernest, he co-founded the Syndicat national des artistes plasticiens CGT in 1977. However, by the 1980s, he had become a libertarian.

== Personal life and death ==
Cueco had a wife, Marinette Cueco, and a son, Pablo Cueco, a professional zarb player. He resided between Vigeois in his native Corrèze and Paris.

Cueco died of a kidney infection but was weakened by Alzheimer's disease on 13 March 2017 in Paris. He was 87.

== Works ==
- Cueco, Henri; Gaudibert, Pierre (1988). L'arène de l'art. Paris: Galilée. ISBN 9782718603261. OCLC 932364809.
- Cueco, Henri (1993). Journal d'atelier, 1988–1991 ou Le journal d'une pomme de terre. Paris: ENSB-A. ISBN 9782840560050. OCLC 489576429.
- Cueco, Henri (1997). Comment grossir sans se priver. Paris: Atelier Bordas. OCLC 223004917.
- Cueco, Henri (2000). Dessine-moi un bouton. Paris: Seuil. ISBN 9782020399425. OCLC 468101838.
- Cueco, Henri (2000). L'Inventaire des queues de cerises. Paris: Seuil. ISBN 9782020399401. OCLC 468101921.
- Cueco, Henri (2001). La Petite Peinture. Paris: Cercle d'art. ISBN 9782702206317. OCLC 468540096.
- Cueco, Henri (2004). Dialogue avec mon jardinier. Paris: Seuil. ISBN 9782020669573. OCLC 912475072.
- Cueco, Henri (2005). Le Collectionneur de collections. Paris: Seuil. ISBN 9782020813563. OCLC 419989440.
- Cueco, Henri (2012). L'Été des serpents. Paris: JBz. ISBN 9782755608533. OCLC 771282138.
- Cueco, Henri (2013). Passage des astragales. Montrouge: Bayard. ISBN 9782227486065. OCLC 851910834.
