= Shigeo Anzai =

Japanese photographer (1939–2020)

Shigeo Anzai (安斎 重男, Anzai Shigeo; born 1939, died August 13th, 2020) was a Japanese photographer. A self-professed "art documentarist", Anzai is well-known for his prolific photographic documentation of artworks, exhibitions, and events of his time. He is also known for intimate portraits of popular modern and contemporary artists, which cast their subjects in an unexpected, unposed, and humanizing light. As Anzai noted for Artforum, he was interested in the "humanity" of his subjects, or the human being within the artist, rather than the artist within the human being. Anzai's style of portraiture stands in contrast to the popular modes of portrait photography of the time which monumentalized their subjects, as in the work of Hans Namuth. Anzai is known for his snapshots of artists such as Shuzo Takiguchi, Atsuko Tanaka, Yayoi Kusama, Tetsumi Kudo, Joseph Beuys, and Isamu Noguchi, among others.

== Early life and professional activity ==
Shigeo Anzai was born in 1939 in the city of Atsugi in Kanagawa Prefecture, Japan. He studied applied chemistry in high school and, after graduation, spent five years working in the Japanese oil industry. During this time, he taught himself painting and drawing. He began showing paintings in group exhibitions at the Muramatsu Gallery (1967) and Tokiwa Gallery (1968), as well as the Tokyo Metropolitan Museum (1968, 1969). He also held a solo exhibition of paintings at Tamura Gallery (1969), where many of the Mono-ha artists exhibited. In that same year, he met artist and philosopher Lee Ufan and bought his first camera. A photograph of the work Phenomenon and Perception B (Chikaku to genshō B) from a solo exhibition by Lee (1936- ) held at Tamura Gallery (January 12–24, 1970) is one of the first images Anzai ever took of another artist's work. This image is a telling example of his subjective involvement in documenting artworks, which was to have a significant impact on how Mono-ha works were seen historically. In the photograph, the work (composed of stones floating in raw cotton) is shown in a corner of the gallery. If it were not for the darkly-etched border around the frame with the sprockets of film showing at the lower edge of the image, the white of the wall and the whites of the cotton fibers would risk being lost in this ambiguous gray composition.

Anzai's early photographic activities were not occupied chiefly with recording a scene, but in actively participating in the atmosphere in which the works were being thought about. Just after taking photographs of Lee's work at Tamura Gallery, for example, the two of them went to a nearby soba noodle shop. Lee discussed the importance of mono and ba (place) in the work he and others were producing as well as the lack of collectors who would preserve and care for their works after they were displayed. Lee felt that with no artworks and no photographs remaining their ideas could disappear just as quickly as they had appeared. This was one of the first moments when Anzai saw his place within the issues artists were contesting in staging ephemeral installations in galleries, museums and outdoor spaces. Anzai was active in the formative debates over mono at their inception, before the invention of Mono-ha.

In 1983, Lee recollected on Anzai's first involvement as juvenile but persistent: "Because he was so poor, you couldn't really call him a photographer, and he had come so far and volunteered to take pictures ... I encouraged him on the one hand, but on the other, I felt that since this was something I hadn't asked him to do, there wasn't any reason to egg him on."

During this time, Anzai started taking photographs but also continued painting. It was the intense conversations he had with Lee, Sekine Nobuo, Yoshida Katsurō and others that would inspire him to devote himself to photographing the camera instead of canvas. Armed with a Leica camera, Anzai recorded his surroundings, happenings, and colleagues from the late 60s onwards. In 1978, Anzai received a J.D. Rockefeller III Fund Foundation Fellowship to live in New York for a year. While there, he photographed performances at The Kitchen, documented the contemporary art scene in New York thoroughly with his camera, and started to establish relationships with Bill Viola, Laurie Anderson, and other emerging artists of the time.

After returning from the United States, Anzai's work became more international in scope. While photographing Documenta in Kassel and the Venice Biennale, he documented the works of Isamu Noguchi and Anthony Caro, subsequently publishing them in monographs. In the 1990s, he began photographing outdoor sculptures and public art works throughout Japan. He ambitiously documented the activities of groups of young artists such as "Studio Shokudo" and "Showa 40 nen-kai (The Group 1965)."

== Artwork ==
As Anzai himself describes of his process: "In other words, the essence of my work is not how things relate to photography, but how I relate to all of the things I encounter through the medium of photography." Since the 1970s, Anzai's practice centered on documenting the contemporary art scene with his camera. Rather than documenting static objects like painting and sculpture, however, Anzai's photographs focus especially on ephemeral moments, such as events and performances in galleries and parks, or the time-based, temporary works of artists like Lee Ufan and Kishio Suga of the Mono-ha movement. Interestingly, Anzai noted for Edan Corkill of The Japan Times that he loses interest when a subject becomes too famous.

Anzai's practice, apart from its documentary moments, also features works that complicate the photograph as object record. This occurs, for example, in works in which Anzai inserts himself, such as in an image of Lee Ufan installing his work Relatum at the National Museum of Modern Art, Tokyo, (1970). In the image, Anzai's use of a tilted angle, a wide-angle lens, depth of field, black-and-white film, hand-written inscriptions, and the oversized negative easel signal his singular subjectivity as a photographer. Additionally, the image not only describes the artwork and its surroundings, but expands the artwork insofar as it renders visible the tension and contradiction between the work's object-hood and its contingency. The photograph makes visible the process of the work's formation in the specific environment at a specific time (while also suggesting the opposite process of the work's de-formation, which will occur upon its de-installation).

This visual as well as metaphorical subjectivity, referred to as Anzai's "angle of distinction", is also revealed on the surface of his silver gelatin prints in the captions he inscribes around the frame of each image. His hand-written notations are made with a black pen on the white border, giving the photographs the feeling of a unique hand drawing. In a caption for a photograph taken on the occasion of the Mono-ha and Post Mono-ha Exhibition at the Seibu Museum of Art in 1987 Anzai writes: "Post Mono-ha's Group Show, Seibu Museum, June 25, 1987." The captions, as well as the obsessive recording of dates, reveal a self-conscious archiving of time. In his careful captioning, Anzai does more than record the facts of an event or work; rather he is asserting the relevance and significance of various events, artists and artworks.

Although the inscriptions may appear to describe the details of what is inside the frame, they are always selective and on further inspection reveal a degree of irony. For example, on the image of artists installing their work at the Tokyo Metropolitan Art Museum, he later wrote, "View of Installing the Mainichi Contemporary Exhibit. Air thick with enthusiasm, the young artists use all kinds of materials in defiance: wood, soil and water." The image looks like a bird's eye view of any exhibition being unpacked but the caption frames the artists as defiant users of edgy and raw materials. Anzai frames the public actions of artists who actively engaged with the surroundings for this Museum in Ueno Park, such as one artist who threw buckets of water into the air above the stairway entrance or another artist who tore a circle into the pavement. In so doing he participates in this "air thick with enthusiasm" that was the fertile ground for radical art activities. while also bringing along a cloud of irony which floats in the air as it passes through time.

== Selected exhibitions ==
In 1970, Anzai seized the opportunity to photograph the 10th Tokyo Biennale, entitled Between Man and Matter, which heavily featured Mono-ha works as well as a wide swathe of Japanese experimental art from the immediately post-war period, for an international audience. This is largely considered Anzai's most monumental project, as a documentarian of the epoch-making exhibition. The exhibition also featured the work of foreign artists, who came to Japan for production. For example, Anzai served as an assistant to Richard Serra and Daniel Buren, in addition to documenting their work photographically, including photographs of activities that were never part of the public exhibition. From this experience, Anzai came into contact with the new forms of art from abroad and found the effectiveness of photography as a means to support the art of his time.

In 2000, the National Museum of Art Osaka held Anzai's largest career retrospective to date. Titled Shigeo Anzai's Eye: Recording on Contemporary Art by Shigeo Anzai, the exhibition featuring two thousand of the artist's works. In 2007, the National Art Center Tokyo held a solo exhibition titled Personal Photo Archives, featuring around 3,000 of Anzai's photographs over 37 years. The exhibition title, chosen by Anzai himself, embodied the ethos of his work: an archive of the development of modern art, photographed from a highly-personal viewpoint built on close relationships with artists.

The exhibition featured Anzai's Freeze series in complete form in its totality of 100 works, as a later series. The series features the enlarged faces of Japanese artists at 1.25 meter by 1.0 meter, capturing a "frozen" moment as the series title indicates.
