= Musée national des Arts d'Afrique et d'Océanie =

Defunct museum in Paris, France

Coordinates: 48°50′7″N 2°24′34″E

The Musée national des Arts d'Afrique et d'Océanie (French pronunciation: [myze nɑsjɔnal dez‿aʁ dafʁik e dɔseani]; National Museum of Arts of Africa and Oceania) was a museum formerly located in the Palais de la Porte Dorée on the edge of the Bois de Vincennes at 293, avenue Daumesnil in the 12th arrondissement of Paris, France.

The museum began as the colonial exhibition of 1931, was renamed in 1935 the Musée de la France d’Outre-mer, then in 1960 the Musée des Arts africains et océaniens, and finally in 1990 the Musée national des Arts d'Afrique et d'Océanie.

In 2003 the museum's collection was merged into the Musée du quai Branly, and in its place the Palais de la Porte Dorée now houses the Cité nationale de l'histoire de l'immigration. Its tropical aquarium remains in the cellar of the Palais de la Porte Dorée and is open to the public.

== See also ==
- List of museums in Paris
