= Frac Lorraine =

French regional collection of contemporary art

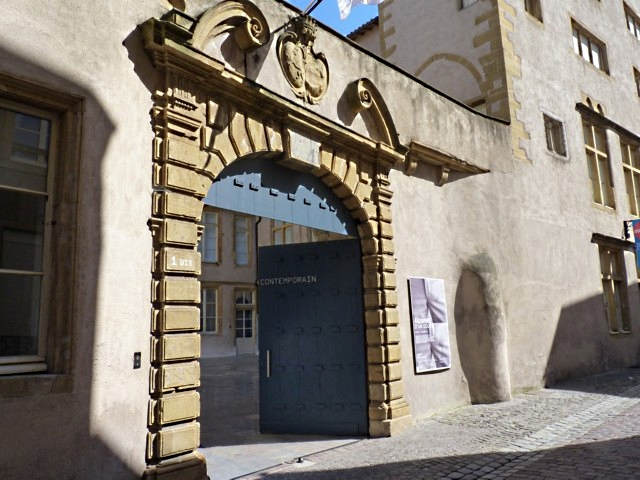
- The Frac Lorraine in the Saint-Livier Hôtel
- Established: 1984
- Location: Saint-Livier Hôtel, Metz
- Coordinates: 49.1207°N 6.1795°E
- Type: Regional collection of contemporary art (Frac)
- Website: www.fraclorraine.org

The Frac Lorraine, also known as 49 Nord 6 Est, is a public collection of contemporary art of the Grand Est region in France. It is located in Metz.

== History ==
Regional collections of contemporary art (Fracs) were created in 1982 by the French Minister of Culture to disseminate contemporary art within each region of France. Set up within the political context of decentralization, Fracs were established on the principle that financing would be shared between the state and the regional councils. Fracs have three complementary missions: to collect the contemporary art of local, as well as, international artists, to take art out into a broad public, and to educate people about arts.

The Frac Lorraine was founded in 1984 as a nomad contemporary art fund. Since 2004, it seats in the Saint-Livier Hôtel, an hôtel particulier of the 12th century in the historical centre of Metz. Since then, the Frac Lorraine has been nicknamed 49 Nord 6 Est (English: 49 North 6 East), because of the geodesic of the Hôtel.

== Cultural policy ==
The Frac Lorraine has an ongoing exhibition schedule, welcoming guest contemporary artists, as well as, those from other disciplines, and engaged in publishing activities and educational initiatives. The Frac Lorraine has developed over the years a network of partners, such as the fine arts museums of Lorraine, the regional art centers and municipal spaces, historic monuments and parks, and the University of Lorraine. For example, the Frac Lorraine has organized in 2012 an exhibition entitled Frac Forever in joint initiative with the Centre Pompidou-Metz. The Frac Lorraine has a documentation center on contemporary art and frequently organizes conferences.

== Contemporary art collection ==
The Frac Lorraine collection encompasses over 800 art works from more than 300 regional, national, and international artists, including Lida Abdul, Marina Abramović, Daniel Buren, Luis Camnitzer, Esther Ferrer, Dora García, Luigi Ghirri, Joan Jonas, Nicholas Nixon, Cornelia Parker, Hito Steyerl, Hiroshi Sugimoto, Niele Toroni, and Wolf Vostell.
