= Painting (Silver over Black, White, Yellow and Red) =

1948 painting by Jackson Pollock

- Artist: Jackson Pollock
- Year: 1948
- Movement: Action painting
- Dimensions: 61 cm × 80 cm (24 in × 31 in)
- Location: Musée National d'Art Moderne; Paris

Painting (Silver over Black, White, Yellow and Red) is a 1948 artwork painted by Jackson Pollock in 1948. He painted it by dripping small dots and pouring thin lines of paint over a dyed red piece of fabric.

Sometime prior to April 1949, Pollock traded the painting to Dan Miller, the shopkeeper of Springs General Store, in East Hampton, New York, as payment for a grocery bill. Since the painting is no longer there, the shop now displays a poster of it.

Currently, the painting is kept at the Centre Pompidou, in Metz, France. In 2012–2013, it was part of the exhibition "Explosion! The Legacy of Jackson Pollock" at the Fundació Miró in Barcelona, curated by Magnus af Petersens.
