= Thierry Laurent (art critic) =

French art critic (born 1959)

Thierry Laurent is a French art critic. He was born in 1959. He has worked variously as an auctioneer, art critic, and teacher. He has written a series of books on contemporary art, notably one about the French artist Daniel Buren titled Mots clefs pour Daniel Buren . His first novel Mordre appeared in 2007.
