= Soderquist =

Soderquist or Söderquist is a surname. Notable people with the surname include:

- Claes Söderquist (born 1939), Swedish artist and filmmaker
- Don Soderquist (1934-2016), American businessman
- Larry Soderquist (1944-2005), American legal scholar
- Ryan Soderquist, American ice hockey coach
