= Les Deux Plateaux =

Art installation in Paris, France

Coordinates: 48°51′49″N 2°20′13″E

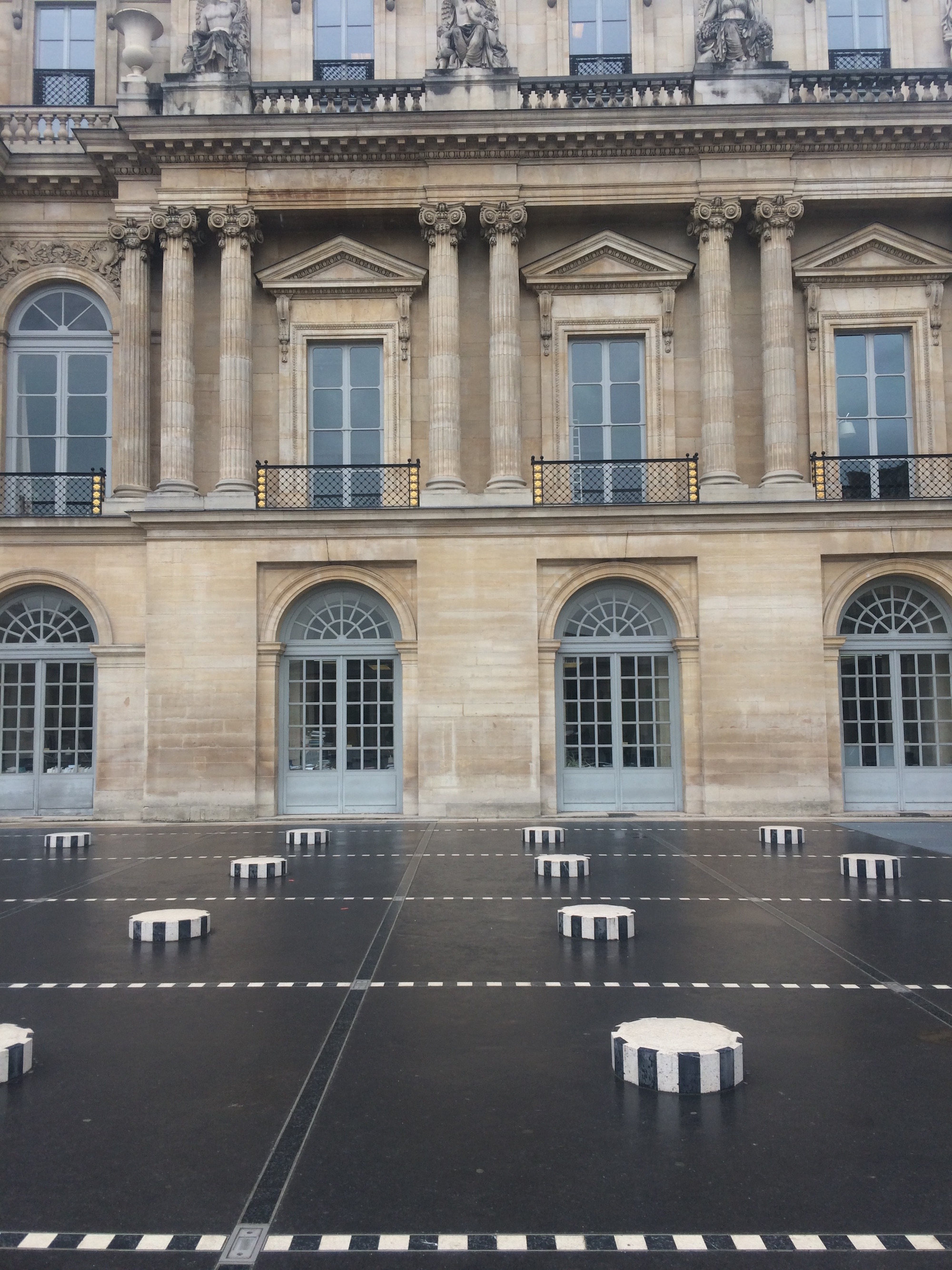
The Colonnes de Buren in the Cour d'Honneur of the Palais-Royal

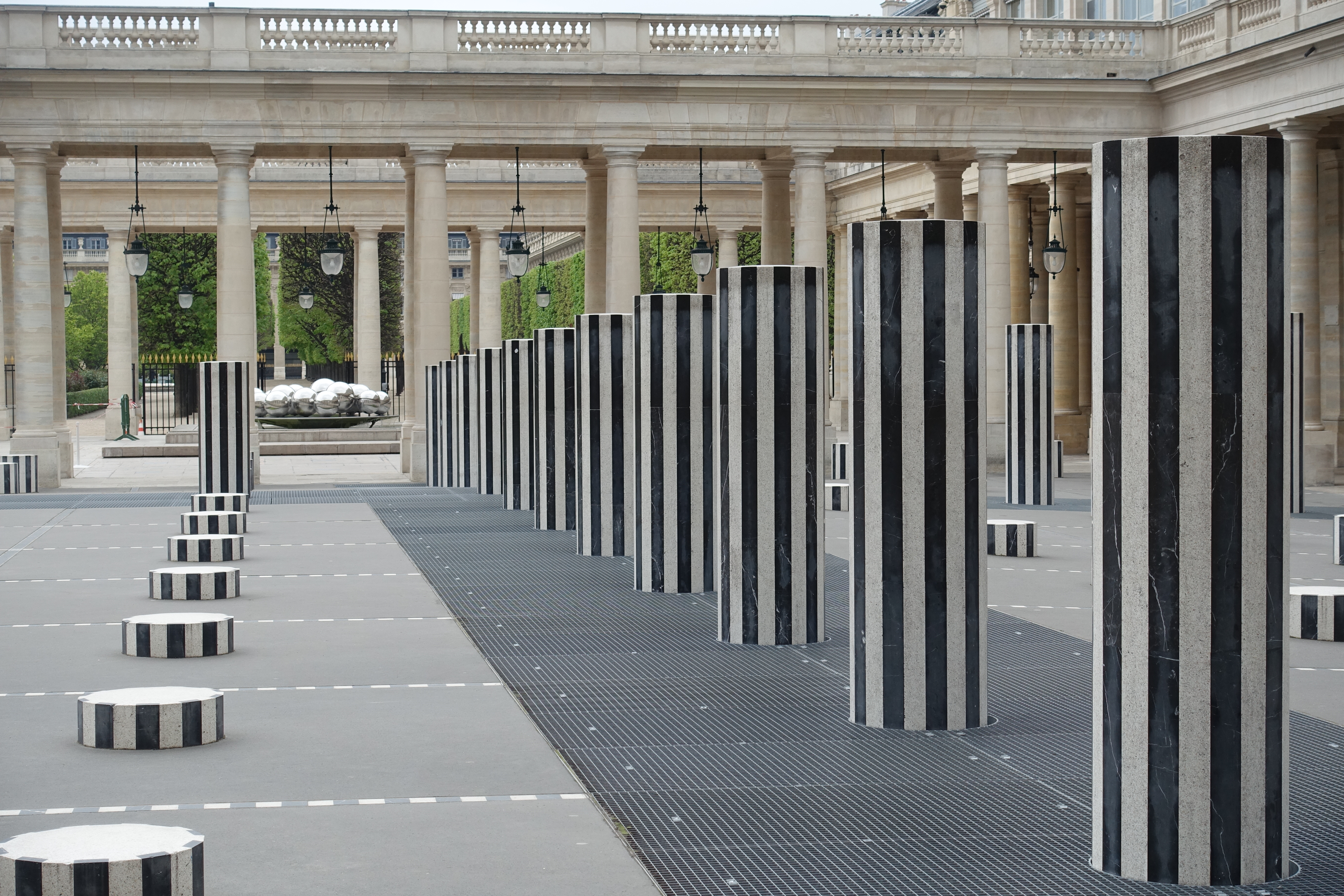
Colonnes de Buren

Les Deux Plateaux, more commonly known as the Colonnes de Buren, is an art installation created by the French artist Daniel Buren in 1985–1986. It is located in the inner courtyard (Cour d'Honneur) of the Palais Royal in Paris, France.

As described by the architectural writer Andrew Ayers, "Buren's work takes the form of a conceptual grid imposed on the courtyard, whose intersections are marked by candy-striped black-and-white columns of different heights poking up from the courtyard's floor like sticks of seaside rock. ... In one sense the installation can be read as an exploration of the perception and intellectual projection of space."

The work replaced the courtyard's former parking lot and was designed to conceal ventilation shafts for an underground extension of the culture ministry's premises. Some of the columns extend below courtyard level and are surrounded by pools of water into which passersby toss coins.

The project was the brainchild of the culture minister Jack Lang and elicited considerable controversy at the time. It was attacked for its cost and unsuitability to a historic landmark. Lang paid no attention to the orders of the Commission des Monuments Historiques, which objected to the plan. In retrospect Ayers has remarked: "Given the harmlessness of the result (deliberate — Buren wanted a monument that would not dominate), the fuss seems excessive, although the columns have proved not only expensive to install, but also to maintain."
