= BMPT (art group) =

French art group

BMPT was a Paris-based late Modern art group formed in the mid-1960s by painters Daniel Buren, Olivier Mosset, Michel Parmentier, and Niele Toroni, which, together with the Supports/Surfaces movement, was one of the main representatives of Minimalism in France in the 1960s.

== Ideals of the Group ==
BMPT was founded to challenge established methods of art-making and to theorize new social and political functions for art and artists. This often included radical criticism of the traditional methods and assumptions of art.

== History ==
In 1966–67, BMPT presented five exhibitions, called manifestations, which questioned authorial prerogative and the institutionalizing role of the Paris Salons. More broadly, BMPT reflected critically on the spectacular, self-conscious nature of the new avant-garde in France. They tested established ideas of artistic authorship and originality by implying that they often made each other's works, while emphasizing the objecthood, rather than the originality, of their paintings. In one, the painters presented their iconic artworks as decor for a performance that never occurs, leaving the audience to look at it intently for a long period as they wait for the show. In another manifestation, the artists painted their works in a public space, before removing them, replacing the finished canvases with a banner that read, in French, "Buren, Mosset, Parmentier, Toroni Do Not Exhibit."

Seeking to create art that was simple and self-evident, they suppressed subjectivity and expressiveness in favor of practical systems, such as the utilization of neutral, repetitive patterns and an apparent eschewal of aesthetic historical grounding: as in Daniel Buren's painting with woven black and white stripes or Niele Toroni's metric square brush strokes of oil on canvas. This stance reached its apotheosis in the zero degree paintings of Olivier Mosset—more than 200 identical oil paintings of a small black circle at the center of white canvas one meter square produced between 1966 and 1974.
