= Olivier Mosset =

Swiss visual artist

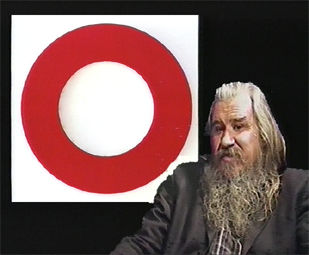
- Olivier Mosset, 2003
- Born: 1944 (age 81–82); Bern, Switzerland
- Known for: Painting

Olivier Mosset (born 1944 in Bern, Switzerland) is a Swiss visual artist. He lives and works in Tucson, Arizona.

== Life and work ==
Olivier Mosset has spent considerable time in New York and Paris. In Paris in the 1960s he was a member of the BMPT (art group), along with Daniel Buren, Michel Parmentier (artist), and Niele Toroni, their initials reflected in their collective acronym. The group questioned notions of authorship and originality, implying that they often did each other's works, and that the art object was more important than its authorship. They sought to democratize art through their radical procedures and by repeating a specific compositional device across multiple grounds: Mosset focused on the circle, which he painted in some two hundred iterations between 1966 and 1974. As a young artist, Mosset was an assistant to both Jean Tinguely and Daniel Spoerri. In the Fall 1968 edition of "The Paris Review" appeared "Reproductions of five paintings by Olivier Mosset." The five halftone photogravures of paintings of concentric circles centered on square grounds, reproduced the same size, looked identical.

Later, in New York in the late 1970s, Mosset undertook a long series of monochrome paintings, during the heyday of Neo-expressionism. He became a founding member of the New York Radical Painting group, radical referring both to an implied radical social stance, as well as a returning to the radical “root” of painting. This re-assertion of social relevance for abstraction, and even the monochrome, hadn't been emphasized to such a degree since Kazimir Malevich and Alexander Rodchenko.

In the 1980s neo-geo artists, such as Peter Halley who asserted a socially relevant, critical role for geometric abstraction, cited Mosset as an influence.

Mosset represented Switzerland at the 44th Venice Biennale in 1990 and participated in the Whitney Biennial, Whitney Museum of American Art in New York in 2008.

In 2007, Olivier Mosset donated 171 works from his own collection to the Musée des Beaux-Arts de La Chaux-de-Fonds (MBAC) in Switzerland.

In 2012 the artist created stage designs for a ballet, entitled Sous Apparence, at the Paris Opera Ballet.

Mosset's works are in the collections of the Museum of Modern Art in New York, the Centre national d'art et de culture Georges Pompidou in Paris, the Musée d'Art Moderne et Contemporain (MAMCO) in Geneva, and the Musée Cantonal des Beaux-Arts in Lausanne, among other public collections.

== Style ==
Mosset is inspired by abstract, conceptual, and minimalist art. He is well-recognized for his monochrome, shaped, minimalist paintings, in particular the series of over 200 oil paintings that were all identical. Those paintings Mosset realized from 1966 to 1974 all consist of a square white canvas measuring 100 cm by 100 cm, with a black circle painted in the middle. Three of those identical paintings have been shown together by the Pinault Collection: "A black ring in the center of a square canvas breaks the harmony of an immaculate surface."

Olivier Mosset coats his surfaces evenly with semigloss enamel that only partially conceals the canvas beneath it. The hard enamel creates a shiny plane that catches light.

Mosset developed his own style, sometimes even using objects or walls he transformed into monochrome paintings. One such example, as he recalled in an interview, was notably a fridge, consisting of two canvases with the same dimensions as a refrigerator and freezer compartment. Mosset mentioned an interesting fact: “I remember that the fridge I used for the work came from a piece by Bertrand Lavier, which was also shown at the gallery, in which Bertrand had placed the fridge on something else, a safe or something like that…”

Mosset is also well known for his sculptures. From 1993 onwards he has created "Toblerones", which are meant to reference the Swiss anti-tank barrages and are also known worldwide as a type of chocolate of a very specific triangular shape by the name Toblerone. He exhibited a large selection of his Toblerones at his 2003 retrospective at the Cantonal Museum of Fine Arts in Lausanne. In 2003, Mosset also created a version of Toberlones in ice for Eispavillon (Ice Pavilion) in Saas-Fee, Switzerland, presented the following year in 2004, at Art Unlimited in Art Basel. In 2014, the artist re-created a version of his Toblerones in ice again for the Elevation 1049 exhibition in Gstaad.

== Selected public collections ==
- Museum of Modern Art, New York, U.S.A.
- Centre Georges Pompidou, Paris, France
- Musée d’Art Moderne de Paris (MAM Paris), Paris, France
- Museum of modern art, Ludwig Foundation, Vienna (MUMOK,) in Vienna, Austria
- Migros Museum of Contemporary Art, Zürich, Switzerland
- Mercedes-Benz Art Collection, Mercedes-Benz Museum in Stuttgart, Germany
- Buffalo AKG Art Museum, Buffalo, NY, U.S.A
- Cantonal Museum of Fine Arts, Lausanne, Switzerland
- Musée d'art contemporain de Lyon (MAC), Lyon, France
- MAMCO, Geneva, Switzerland
- Museum Haus Konstruktiv, Zürich, Switzerland
- National Gallery of Canada, Ottawa, Ontario, Canada
- Musée des Beaux Arts, La Chaux-De-Fonds, Switzerland

== Selected solo exhibitions ==
- 1990 Olivier Mosset represented the Swiss Pavilion at the 44th Venice Biennale
- 1993 Le Consortium, Dijon, France
- 1994 Olivier Mosset, Musée cantonal des beaux arts, Sion, Switzerland
- 1996 MAMCO, Geneva, Switzerland
- 1999 Centro d'Arte Contemporanea Ticino, Bellinzona, Switzerland
- 2004 Carré d'Art, Musée d'Art Contemporain, Nîmes, France
- 2010 Olivier Mosset, “A Step Backwards,” Musée d'art contemporain de Lyon (MAC), Lyon, France
- 2011 “Born in Berne” Kunsthalle Bern, Bern, Switzerland
- 2012 “Olivier Mosset ++ Leaving the Museum,” Kunshtalle Zürich, Züritch, Switzerland
- 2012 Olivier Mosset at Indipendenza Studio, Rome, Italy
- 2017 “Abstraction” by Olivier Mosset Jean-Paul Najar Foundation, Dubai, United Arab Emirates
- 2018 “Untitled” by Olivier Mosset, MAMO Centre d'art de la cité Radieuse, Marseille, France
- 2019 Museum Haus Konstruktiv, Zürich, Switzerland
- 2020 Olivier Mosset retrospective, 60 years of artwork, MAMCO, Geneva, Switzerland
- 2021 “Olivier Mosset, a Contemplative & Mystifying Exhibition of the Artist’s Expansive Body of Work,” Tucson Museum of Art, Tucson, Arizona, U.S.A.
- 2023 "Olivier Mosset, San Carlo PG" Cremona, Italy.

== Selected group exhibitions ==
- 1967 Musée d'Art Moderne de Paris "Salon de la Jeune Peinture"
- 1992 MOMA PS1 “Slow Art: Painting in New York Now”
- 2005 MOMA PS1 “The Painted World”
- 2008 Whitney Biennial, at the Whitney Museum of American Art, New York, NY
- 2008 “John Armleder and Olivier Mosset” at the Contemporary Art Museum St. Louis, St. Louis, MO, U.S.A.
- 2014 Manifesta 10, the European Biennial of Contemporary Art, at the State Hermitage Museum in Saint Petersburg, Russia
- 2021 Collection Pinault, “Au-delà de la couleur” (“Beyond Colour”) exhibition at the Couvent des Jacobins in Rennes, France
