= Centre Pompidou-Metz =

Art museum in Metz, France

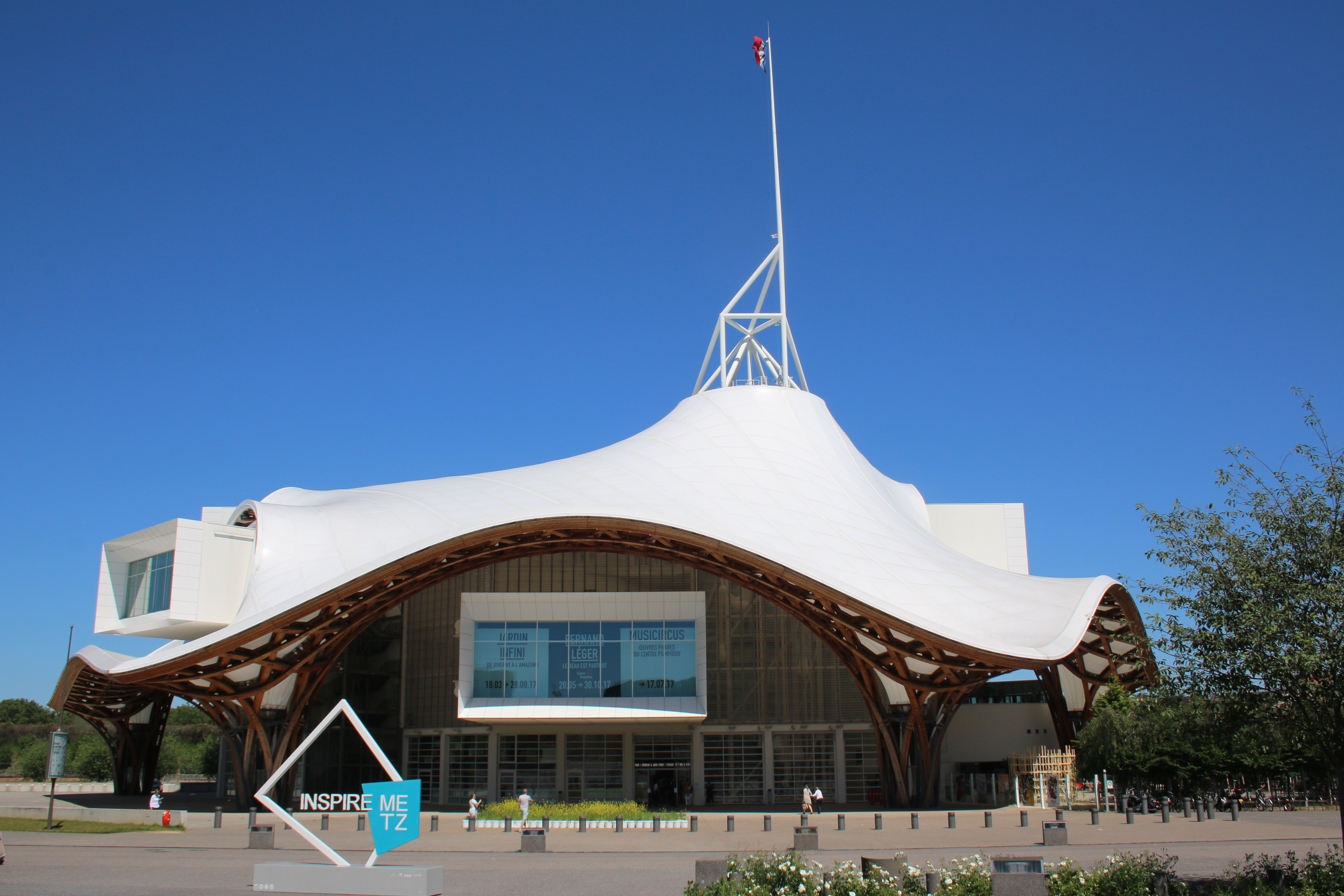
- Centre Pompidou-Metz in August 2017
- Interactive map of the Centre Pompidou-Metz area

General information
- Type: Culture and leisure
- Location: Metz, France
- Coordinates: 49°6′29″N 6°10′48″E
- Construction started: 7 November 2006
- Inaugurated: 12 May 2010
- Cost: 69.33 million Euros
- Landlord: Metz city

Height
- Height: 77 m (253 ft)

Technical details
- Floor area: 10,660 m^{2} (114,700 sq ft)

Design and construction
- Architect: Shigeru Ban
- Architecture firm: Shigeru Ban Architects Europe
- Main contractor: Metz Métropole

Renovating team
- Renovating firm: Demathieu & Bard

The Centre Pompidou-Metz is a museum of modern and contemporary art located in Metz, capital of Lorraine, France. It is a branch of Pompidou arts centre of Paris, and features semi-permanent and temporary exhibitions from the large collection of the French National Museum of Modern Art, the largest European collection of 20th and 21st century arts. The museum is the largest temporary exhibition space outside Paris in France with 5,000 m^{2} (54,000 sq ft) divided between 3 galleries, a theatre, and an auditorium.

The first piece of the monument designed by Japanese architect Shigeru Ban was laid on 7 November 2006, and the building was inaugurated by French President Nicolas Sarkozy on 12 May 2010. The building is remarkable for its roof structure, one of the largest and most complex built to date, which was inspired by a Chinese hat found in Paris by Shigeru Ban.

Since its inauguration, the institution has become one of the most visited cultural venues in France outside Paris.

== Architecture and urban design ==
The Centre Pompidou-Metz is a large hexagon structured round a central spire reaching 77 m (253 ft), alluding to the 1977 opening date of the original Centre Pompidou of Paris. It possesses three rectangular galleries (Gallery 1, 2, and 3) weaving through the building at different levels, jutting out through the roof with huge picture windows angled towards landmarks such as the Saint-Stephen Gothic cathedral, the Imperial railway station, the Arsenal Concert Hall built by Spanish architect Ricardo Bofill, the Arènes indoor sport arena built by French architect Paul Chemetov, and the Seille park. The great nave covers 1,200 m^{2} (13,000 sq ft) and provides flexibility for the exhibition of large artworks, with the ceiling rising progressively from a height of 5.7 m (19 ft) to 18 m (59 ft).

Interior view of the carpentry structure at night. On the Gallery 1's roof, Daniel Buren, Echo of Echos, in December 2011

The roof is the major achievement of the building: a 90 m (300 ft) wide hexagon echoing the building's floor map. With a surface area of 8,000 m^{2} (86,000 sq ft), the roof structure is composed of sixteen kilometres of glued laminated timber, that intersect to form hexagonal wooden units resembling the cane-work pattern of a Chinese hat. The roof's geometry is irregular, featuring curves and counter-curves over the entire building, and in particular the three exhibition galleries. Imitating this kind of hat and its protective fabric, the entire wooden structure is covered with a white fibreglass membrane and a coating of teflon, which has the distinction of being self-cleaning, protecting from direct sunlight, while providing a transparent view at night. The roof structure can be seen from high up during both day and night in Metz from above, an aerial movie made by French photographer Yann Arthus-Bertrand.

The Centre Pompidou-Metz includes also a restaurant terrace, for which French designer Patrick Jouin and Kenyan architect Sanjit Manku produced interior spaces inspired by the image of a kaleidoscope. The museum-surrounding garden has been thought by French landscape architect Jean de Gastine using the concepts of sustainable gardening.

The museum is the cornerstone of the newly created Amphitheater District of Metz. The district of 50 ha (123.6 acres), thought by French architects Nicolas Michelin, Jean-Paul Viguier, and Christian de Portzamparc, and designer Philippe Starck, is currently under construction and includes the edification of a convention centre and a shopping mall. The quarter encompasses already the Seille park designed by French landscape architect Jacques Coulon and the Arènes indoor sport arena built in 2002. The urban project completion is expected to take place by 2016. Swiss designer Ruedi Baur created the Metz's signage systems.

The Centre Pompidou-Metz and its forecourt, named Human Rights square, are built on the site of the Roman amphitheatre of Divodurum Medriomaticum (ancestor of present-day Metz), near the Metz Imperial District and the Station Palace.

== Exhibitions and performances ==
The Centre Pompidou-Metz also displays around 3 to 4 unique temporary exhibitions per year, which are not presented elsewhere. Most of the artworks exhibited are from the large collection of the National Museum of Modern Art, which encompasses the largest European collection of modern and contemporary arts and the second in the world. The museum works in close collaboration with the Los Angeles County Museum of Art, the Luxembourgian Museum of Modern Art, or the Center for Art and Media Karlsruhe in joint initiatives.

The Centre Pompidou-Metz promotes the local art scene in collaborating with the Regional Contemporary Art Fund of Lorraine. In addition to the temporary exhibitions, the Centre Pompidou-Metz museum features seasonal programming with contemporary live shows in its theater and organizes meetings and conferences in its auditorium with worldly recognized, as well as, local artists.

The Centre Pompidou-Metz edifice and surrounding Metz are sometimes used as support for the artistic production displayed during the temporary exhibitions. For example, the architectural structure of the Centre Pompidou-Metz was used as support for a visual art project by French visual artists Simon Geilfus, Yannick Jacquet, and Thomas Vaquié. Also, French aerial photographer Yann Arthus-Bertrand captured Metz from high up, giving a privileged views of the museum and the city for the exhibition Views from above.

Pablo Picasso, Parade, 1917, curtain in May 2012, during the exhibition 1917.

== Exhibitions ==
- Masterpieces ? (2010–2011)
- ECHOS, Work in Situ, Daniel Buren (2011), in collaboration with the Mudam
- Wander, Labyrinthine Variations (2011–2012)
- Bivouac, Ronan and Erwan Bouroullec (2011–2012)
- Echo of Echos: From Above, work in situ, Daniel Buren (2011–2014)
- Sol LeWitt retrospective, wall drawings from 1968 to 2007 (2012–2013)
- 1917 (2012)
- Parade, Pablo Picasso (2012–2013)
- FRAC Forever (2012-2013), in collaboration with the Regional Contemporary Art Fund of Lorraine
- Lines: a Brief History (2013)
- Sol LeWitt as a Collector, an Artist and his Artists (2013)
- Views from Above (2013)
- Allen Ginsberg and the Beat Generation Reality Sandwiches (2013), in collaboration with the Center for Art and Media Karlsruhe
- Dreams of Icarius (2013–2014), extension of Views from Above
- Paparazzi! Photographers, Stars and Artists (2013–2014), in collaboration with the Schirn Kunsthalle Frankfurt
- Hans Richter: Encounters (2013–2014), in collaboration with the Los Angeles County Museum of Art
- 1984–1999 The Decade (2014–2015)
- Simple Forms (2014–2015), in co-action with the Hermès Foundation
- Beacons (from 2014), semi-permanent exhibition held in the Great Nave of the Centre Pompidou-Metz

== Transport and access ==
Metz's signage systems created by Swiss designer Ruedi Baur indicating the direction toward the Centre Pompidou-Metz

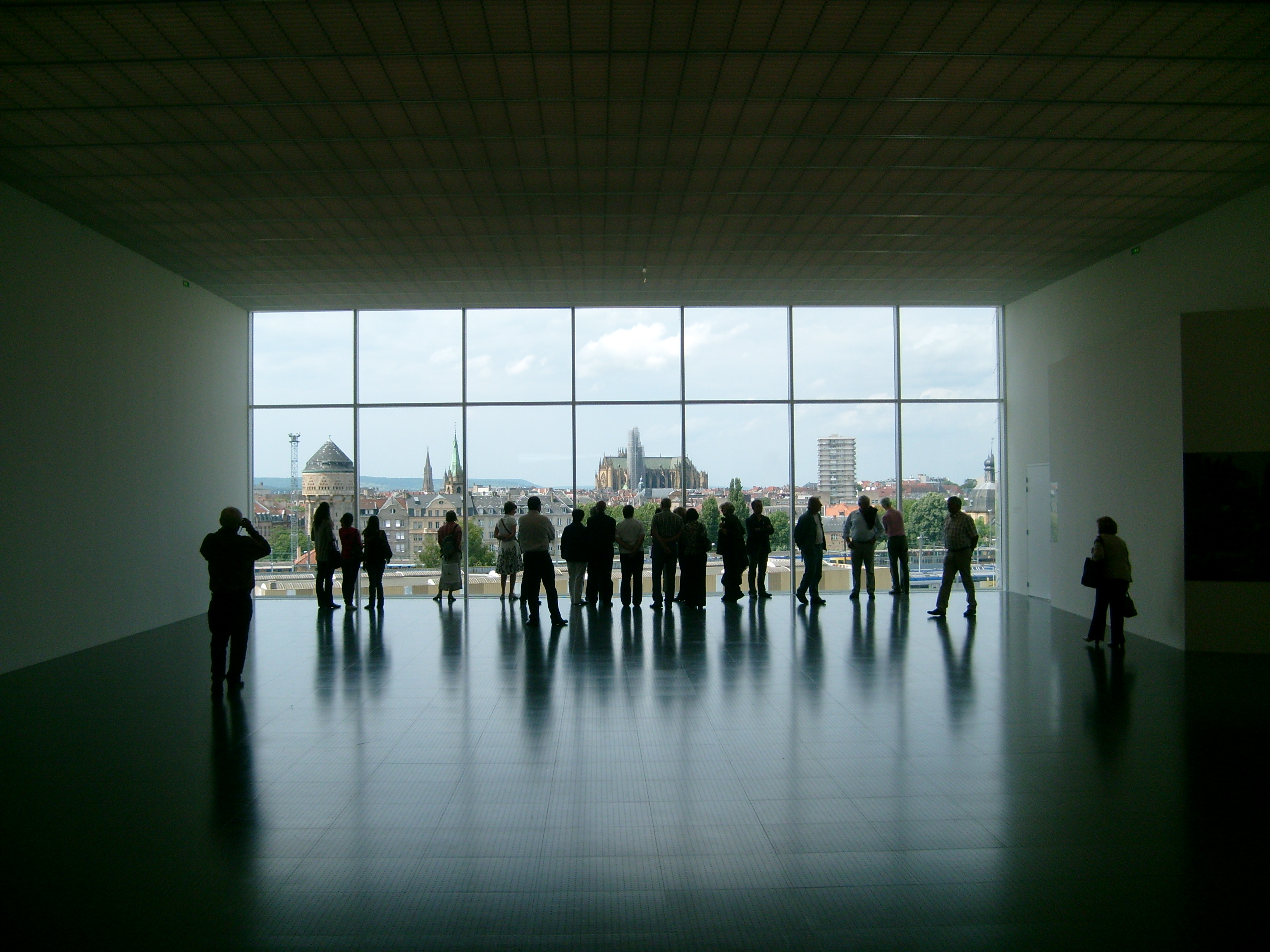
View on the Saint Stephen cathedral and the railway water tower from Gallery 3

The Centre Pompidou-Metz is located in the centre of Metz and is served by Mettis local public transport. Also, the museum is located near the Imperial railway station of Metz, which is connected to the French high speed train network via the LGV East line, which provides a direct rail service to Paris and the city of Luxembourg. The time from Paris East station and France international Paris-Charles de Gaulle Airport to Metz railway station is about 82 and 75 minutes, respectively. Finally, Metz is located at the intersection of two major road axes: the Paris to Strasbourg A4 motorway and the A31 north-south motorway.

== Beacons exhibition ==
Based entirely on loans from the collection at French National Museum of Modern Art, the Beacons exhibition is semi-permanent exhibition that highlights since 2014 a selection of 18 masterpieces rarely shown to the public due to their monumental size. The exhibition's staging provides an overview of the primary movements in art since the start of the 20th century, from Pablo Picasso to Anish Kapoor including Sam Francis, Joseph Beuys, Dan Flavin, and Joan Miró. Art works exhibited include:

- Figures and Birds in the Night, Joan Miró
- Survivors, Yan Pei-Ming
- Homogenous Infiltration for Piano, Joseph Beuys
- Reflexions of a Waterfall I, Louise Nevelson
- Tabula, Simon Hantaï
- Entrance to the Railway Pavilion, Robert Delaunay
- Stage curtain for the ballet Mercure, Pablo Picasso
- Composition with Two Parrots, Fernand Léger
- Orangey, Light Blue Forms, Claude Viallat
- Palombe, Frank Stella
- Painting 202 x 453 cm, 29 June 1979, Pierre Soulages
- Aware II, 28.3.1961, Jean Degottex
- Lost World, Pierre Alechinsky
- In Lovely Blueness, Sam Francis
- For a Little While, Joan Mitchell
- Untitled, Anish Kapoor
- Untitled (to Donna) 5a, Dan Flavin
- Untitled, Robert Irwin

== Inaugural exhibition ==
The inaugural exhibition called Masterpieces? was devoted to masterpieces (about 800), of which over 700 were lent by the Centre Georges Pompidou of Paris. The exhibition considered the relevance of the idea of masterpiece and ran until 17 January 2011. The exhibition has attracted over 800,000 visitors during the following year of its inauguration and included:

- Woman with a Guitar, Georges Braque
- King's Sadness, Henri Matisse
- The Aubade, Lying Nude near Musician, Pablo Picasso
- Guernica, Pablo Picasso
- Ingres's Violin, photographie, Man Ray
- Black cross, Kasimir Malevitch
- Blue I, Blue II, Blue III triptych, Joan Miró
- Reliefs for the Stairs of the Railway Palace, Robert Delaunay
- Capricorn, Max Ernst
- The Background, Jackson Pollock
- Standing Woman, Alberto Giacometti
- Sleeping Muse, Constantin Brâncuși
- The Tropical House, Jean Prouvé

The four parts of the exhibition were:

- Great nave: Masterpieces throughout history
- Gallery 1: Stories behind masterpieces
- Gallery 2: Masterpiece dreams
- Gallery 3: Masterpieces ad infinitum
