= Daniel Buren =

French artist (born 1938)

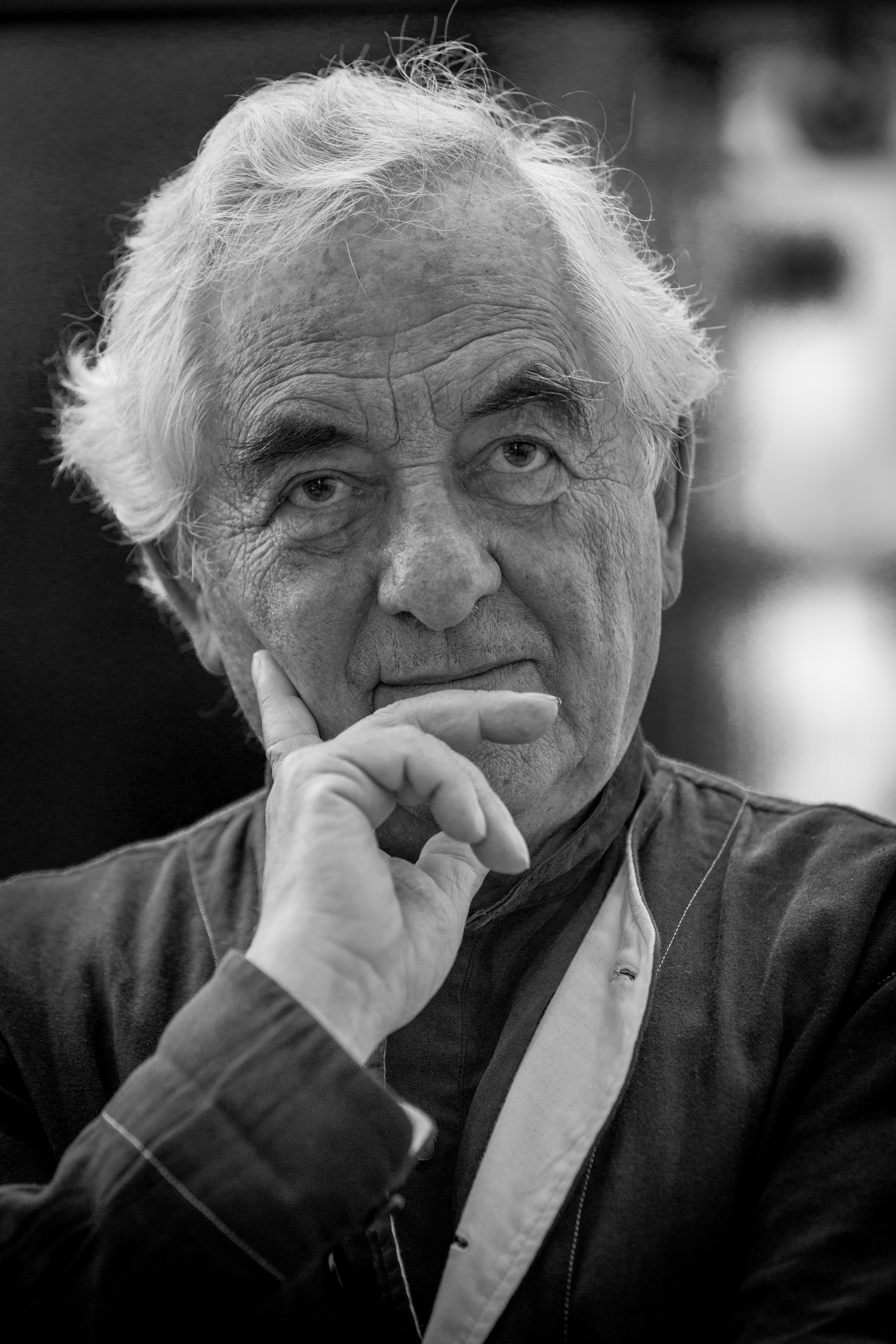
- Daniel Buren, 2014
- Born: 25 March 1938 (age 88); Boulogne-Billancourt, Hauts-de-Seine, France
- Known for: Sculpture, Installation
- Notable work: Les Deux Plateaux
- Movement: Abstract minimalism
- Awards: Praemium Imperiale; Golden Lion Award

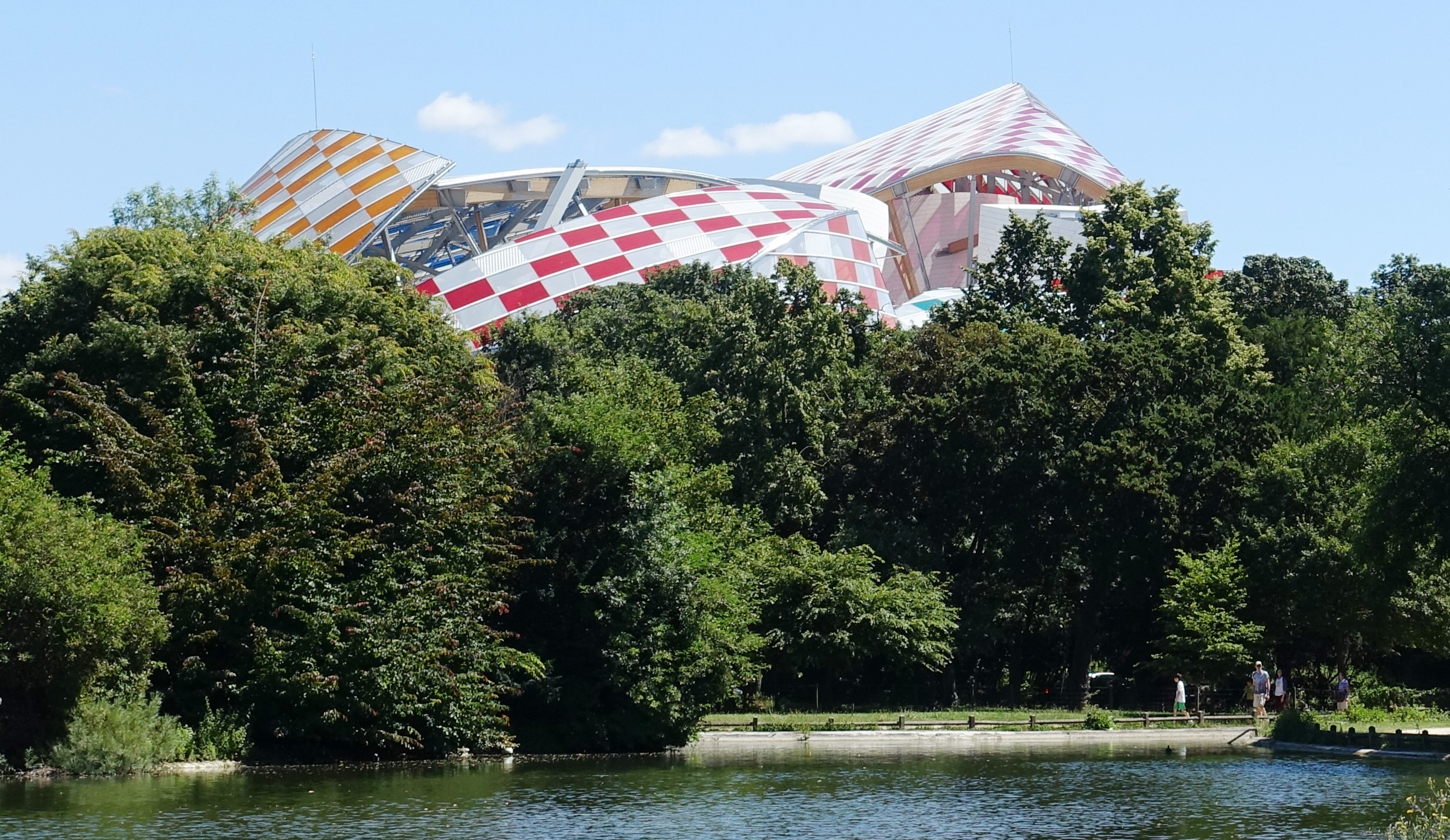
The Observatory of the Light, Fondation Louis Vuitton, Paris.

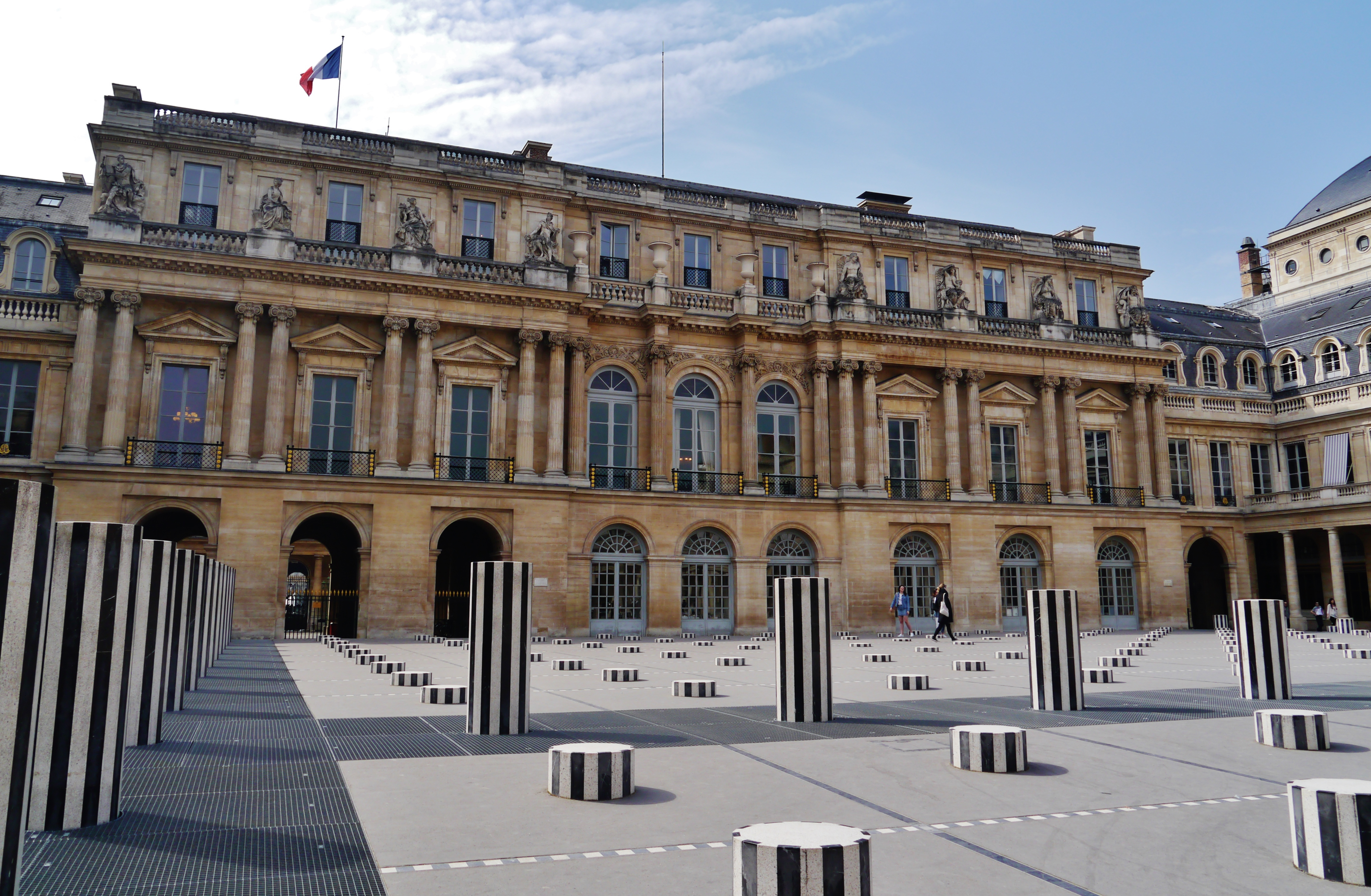
Cour d'Honneur du Palais Royal, "Les Deux Plateaux", Daniel Buren

Daniel Buren (born 25 March 1938, in Boulogne-Billancourt) is a French conceptual artist, painter, and sculptor. He has won numerous awards including the Golden Lion for best pavilion at the Venice Biennale (1986), the International Award for best artist in Stuttgart (1991) and the prestigious Premium Imperiale for painting in Tokyo in 2007. He has created several famous installations, including "Les Deux Plateaux"(1985) in the Cour d'honneur of the Palais-Royal, and the Observatory of the Light in Fondation Louis Vuitton.

== Work ==
Sometimes classified as a Minimalist, Buren is known best for using regular, contrasting colored stripes in an effort to integrate visual surface and architectural space, notably on historical, landmark architecture.

Among his primary concerns is the "scene of production" as a way of presenting art and highlighting facture (the process of 'making' rather than for example, mimesis or representation of anything but the work itself). The work is site-specific installation, having a relation to its setting in contrast to prevailing ideas of an autonomous work of art.

=== Early work ===
He graduated from the Ecole Nationale Supérieure des Métiers d'Art in Paris, in 1960. He began painting in the early 1960s. However, by 1965 – a year he spent in the Grapetree Bay Hotel on the Caribbean island of Saint Croix where he was contracted to make frescoes – he had abandoned traditional painting for the 8.7 cm-wide vertical stripes, which alternated between white and one color, which have become his signature. Working on-site, he strives to contextualise his artistic practice using the stripe – a popular French fabric motif – as a means of visually relating art to its situation, a form of language in space rather than a space in itself. Denoting the trademark stripes as a visual instrument or "seeing tool," he invites viewers to take up his critical standpoint challenging traditional ideas about art.

He began producing unsolicited public art works using striped awning canvas common in France: he started by setting up hundreds of striped posters, so-called affichages sauvages, around Paris and later in more than 100 Metro stations, drawing public attention through these unauthorised bandit-style acts. In June 1970 he put stripes on the front and back of Los Angeles bus benches without permission. In another controversial gesture he blocked the entrance of the gallery with stripes of his first solo exhibition. Expanding on this idea, in 1971 he created a six-foot banner, Peinture-Sculpture, to divide the Solomon R. Guggenheim Museum's rotunda in New York. For his first New York City solo show in 1973, Buren suspended a set of nineteen black and white striped squares of canvas on a cable that ran from one end of the John Weber Gallery to the other, out the window to a building on the other side of West Broadway and back. Nine pieces were inside the gallery and nine outside; a middle piece, which connected the outside and the inside parts of the installation, was placed half-in and half-out in the opening where the window frame had been removed for the duration of the exhibition. In 1977 Buren cut up one of his artworks from 1969 and made a new work, designating that the sections should hang in the corners of a wall, whether that wall was empty, had doors or windows, or even had other artworks already hanging on it.

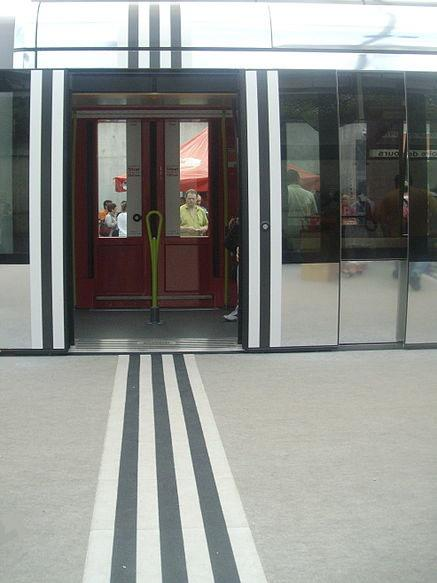
Tours Tram – The vertical stripes; Collaboration design with RCP Design Global

As a conceptual artist, Buren was regarded as visually and spatially audacious, objecting to traditional ways of presenting art through the museum-gallery system while at the same time growing in hot demand to show via the same system. In the late 1960s he connected to the ideas of space and presentation arising through deconstructionist philosophies that had as their background the May 1968 student demonstrations in France. Between 1966 and 1967, he joined forces with fellow artists Olivier Mosset, Michel Parmentier, and Niele Toroni to form the BMPT, whose intention was to reduce paintings to the most basic physical and visual elements through the systematic repetition of motifs.

Often referred to as "the stripe guy," Buren also expresses his theme in paint, laser cut fabric, light boxes, transparent fabrics and ceramic cup sets. His stripes are displayed in private homes, public places, and museums worldwide. Since the 1950s he has amassed some 400,000 of what he calls photos-souvenirs, documenting his work and travels around the globe.

=== Installations ===
From 1960 on, Buren designed a number of permanent site-specific installations in the United States, Belgium, France, and Germany. In 1986 he created a 3,000-square-meter sculpture in the great courtyard of the Palais Royal, in Paris: Les Deux Plateaux, more commonly referred to as the Colonnes de Buren ("Buren's Columns"). This provoked an intense debate over the integration of contemporary art and historic buildings. In 1993, Buren was commissioned to design the work in situ, Poser/Déposer/Exposer, for the Café Richelieu at the Louvre in collaboration with Jean-Pierre Raynaud.

Since the 1990s, Buren's work has become more architectural. He creates new spaces within existing environments such as city centers (A Colored Square in the Sky, 2007), public parks (La Cabane Éclatée aux 4 Salles, 2005), entire museums (The Eye of the Storm, 2005), and even beaches (Le Vent soufle où il veut, 2009). For Green and White Fence (1999/2001) Buren installed a functional fence sculpture, consisting of fence posts at four-meter intervals, painted green and white 87-millimeter stripes along a single ridge line: Since the first part's installation, the artist's theme has been extended until, over time, it will become the only form of fence on Gibbs Farm in New Zealand. In 2004, for the occasion of the opening of the French cultural year in China, Buren exhibited in his in situ installation De l'azur au Temple du Ciel (From the sky to Temple of Heaven) at Temple of Heaven in Beijing. A Rainbow in the Sky (2009) consisted of thousands of colorful pennant flags hovering over a busy pedestrian square in Pasadena, California for two months.

Buren collaborated with Hermès on a number of occasions. The artist inaugurated Hermès' contemporary art gallery La Verrière in Brussels in 2000 by transforming its walls with bold graphics, colours and his trademark stripes, and later opened the Atelier Hermès in Dosan Park, Seoul with his Filtres colorés, coloured panels that diffused the light to dramatic effect. In 2010, he created "Photo souvenirs au carré", a 365 limited-edition line of scarves decorated with silk-printed photographs.

In 2009 Buren collaborated with the collective Ensemble(s) La Ligne created by RCP Design Global agency, with, among others, Louis Dandrel and Roger Tallon to create Curseur (2009–2013). It is a work in situ – for Tours Tram – three black and white stripes vertically, which will join the same horizontal marking on the ground, both at right angles to the doors' opening. Trainsets shaped cursor with "mirror effect" identified in black and white stripes.

In 2014, the rooftop of Modernist architect Le Corbusier's Cité Radieuse building in Marseilles hosted an installation of mirrors and coloured glass by Buren. Défini, Fini, Infini (2014) was an installation for the Marseilles Modulor (MaMo), led by French designer Ora-Ïto, who in 2013 transformed the iconic rooftop into an international arts space.

In 2017, Buren completed his first permanent installation in the United Kingdom, 'Diamonds and Circles' permanent works 'in situ', a work for Art on the Underground on the walls of the expanded ticket hall at Tottenham Court Road.

=== Performance ===
From 1966 to '67, Buren and the other BMPT artists staged a series of performances they called manifestations, in which the group made or exhibited their work in public as a critical encounter with audiences.

Voile/Toile – Toile/Voile, a piece consisting of boat races followed by museum displays of sail-canvasses, was originally created for a regatta on the Wannsee, Berlin, in 1975 and later produced in Geneva (1979), Lucerne (1980), Villeneuve-d'Ascq (1983), Lyon-Villeurbanne (1998), Tel Aviv (1999), Sevilla (2004), and Grasmere (2005). This work always has two separate parts. In the first, nine Optimists are fitted with striped canvas sails (white with red, blue, yellow, green or brown stripes). The two white stripes at the edges are covered with white paint. The boats then race in a regatta. In the second part, after the race, the sails are exhibited in a museum in the city where the regatta was held. They are presented in the order they crossed the finishing line, from one to nine and from left to right, as befits the exhibition area. In 1973 and 1974 Daniel Buren, performs with Jannis Kounellis, Wolf Vostell and other artists in Berlin at the ADA – Aktionen der Avantgarde.

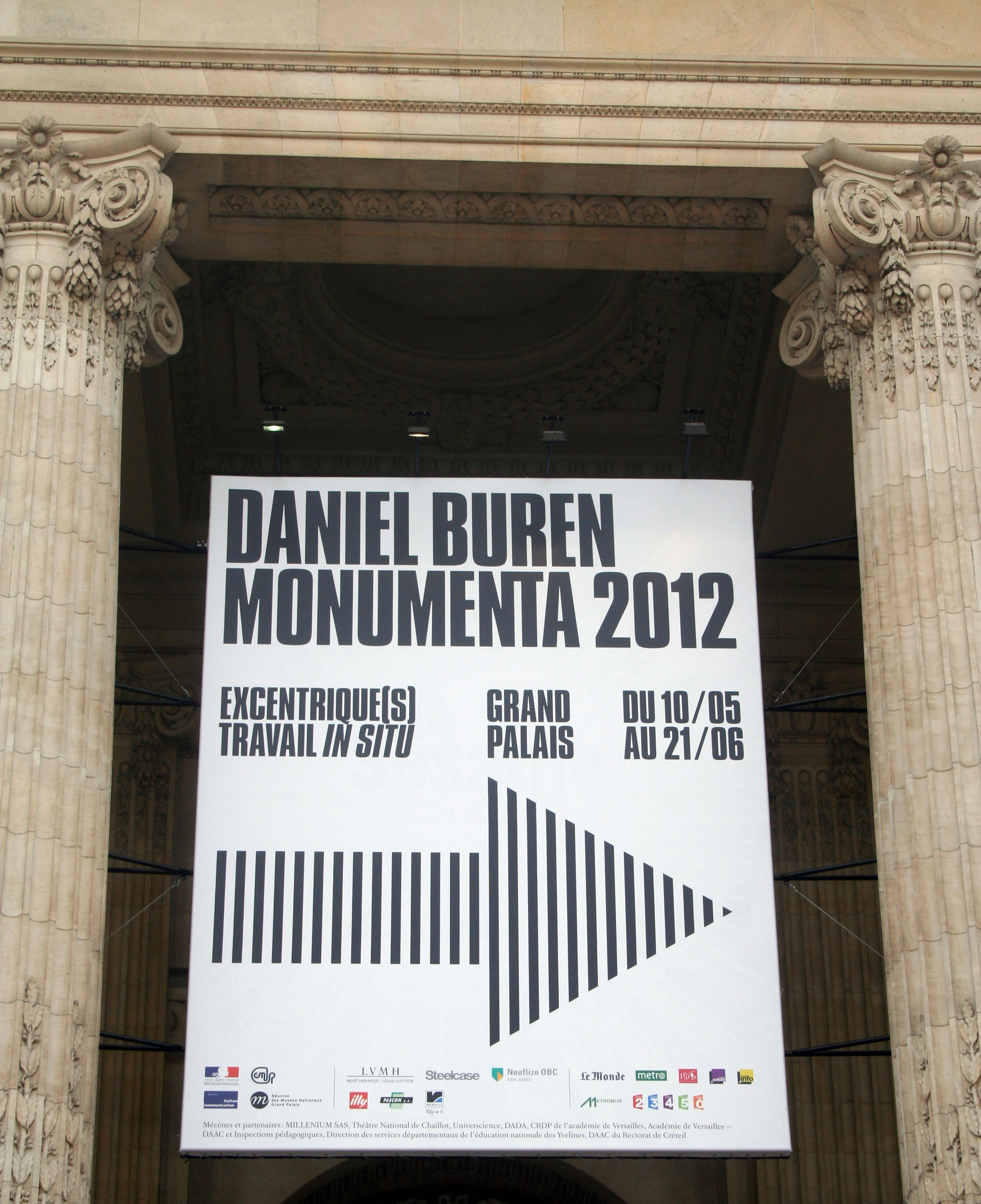
Paris, Monumenta 2012, Daniel Buren

Initially presented in Genazzano in 1982, as part of a group project called La zattera di Babele ("The Raft of Babel"), Couleurs superposées (Layered colours) is an hour-long public performance, during which paper is pasted up and then torn down. For forty minutes, five actors paste striped colored paper on the wall, according to the artist's instructions. The white stripes must be exactly aligned. The spectators see colours and shapes appearing and disappearing as successive layers are added. Then for the remaining twenty minutes, the actors, still directed by the artist, tear off the freshly pasted papers to reveal fragments of the previous layers. The spectators watch the evolution of work on a picture that is never finished and whose successive stages are recorded only in their memory. After the performance, the piece is destroyed. The piece was later performed in Tokyo, Bern, Eindhoven, Venice, Villeneuve d'Ascq, New York (2005), and Paris (2005). In 2009, Buren directed Couleurs superposées at the Opéra-Théâtre de Metz Métropole on the occasion of the opening of the Centre Pompidou-Metz.

=== Writing ===
That writing is an important activity for Buren is made particularly clear in his collected texts Les Écrits, published in 1991 and then in 2012.

- Buren, Daniel; Sanchez, Marc (2012). Les écrits 1965-2012. Volume I, Volume I. Paris: Flammarion : Centre national des arts plastiques. ISBN 978-2-08-128288-9.
- Buren, Daniel; Sanchez, Marc (2013). Les écrits, 1965-2012. Volume II, Volume II. Paris: Flammarion : Centre national des arts plastiques. ISBN 978-2-08-128798-3.

== Exhibitions ==
Buren had his first important solo exhibition at the Galleria Apollinaire in Milan in 1968, where he blocked the only entrance to the gallery, a glass door, with a striped support. He has since presented his environmental installations worldwide. By the 1970s and 1980s he was exhibiting in Europe, America and Japan. Buren wished to take part in Harald Szeemann's exhibition "When Attitudes Become Form", in Bern in 1969, without being invited. Two of the contributing artists offered him space, but he instead set about covering billboards in the city with his stripes. He was arrested and had to leave Switzerland. In 1971, Buren devised a banner, 20 by 10 metres, with white and blue stripes on both sides to be hung at the Guggenheim Museum in New York in a big international group show, conceived to encourage artists to exploit the building's space. Other artists, including Dan Flavin and Donald Judd, protested that the banner blocked views across the rotunda, compromising their works. Buren, in turn, said Flavin's fluorescent lights colored his banner. The night before the opening, the banner was removed. Buren was later invited to participate in the Documentas 5 through 7 (1972–1982).

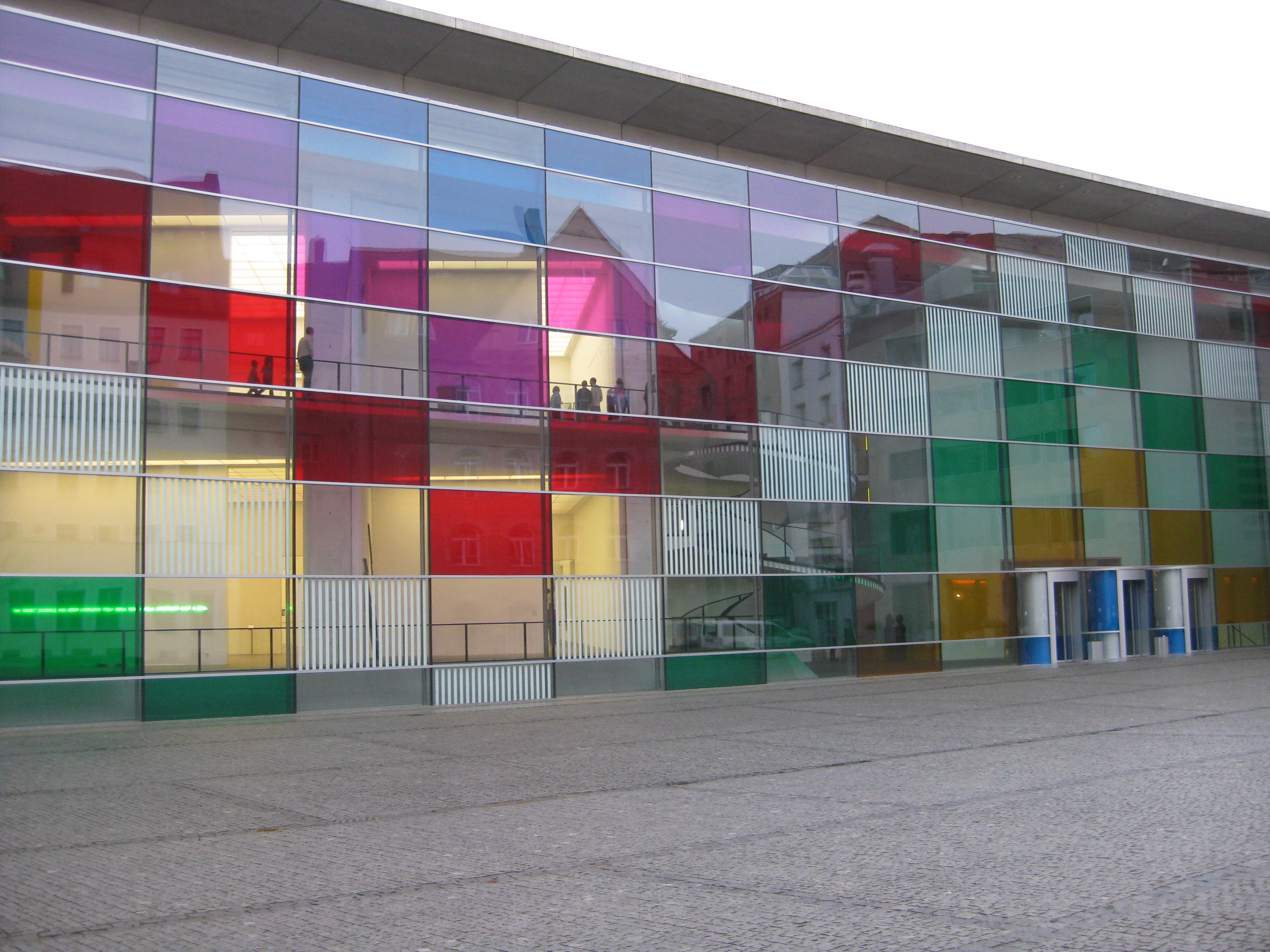
Daniel Buren Neues Museum Nürnberg

In 1986, when François Mitterrand was president of France, Buren attained leading artist status after he created Les Deux Plateaux (1985–86), a work in situ for the Cour d'honneur at the Palais Royal in Paris. That same year, he represented France at the Venice Biennale and won the Golden Lion Award for best pavilion. Buren had major solo exhibitions at the Touko Museum of Contemporary Art, Tokyo, in 1989, at the Centre Georges Pompidou in Paris in 2002, at the Guggenheim Museum in New York in 2005, at Modern Art Oxford in 2006, and at the Kunsthalle Baden-Baden in 2011. In December 2006 Buren won the competition to make Arcos Rojos/Arku Gorriaka, a new major project for the iconic Puente de La Salve bridge next to the Guggenheim Museum in Bilbao while, in February 2007, the Musée Fabre in Montpellier re-opened with a new permanent commission. For the 52nd Venice Biennale, Buren created a new site-specific work for the Giardini of the Italian Pavilion, and was curator of Sophie Calle's contribution to the French Pavilion. In 2011, he decided to cancel an exhibition at the Ullens Center for Contemporary Art in Beijing in "solidarity" with detained artist Ai Weiwei. The fifth artist ever to fill the space of the Grand Palais on the occasion of the Monumenta exhibition, Buren conceived Excentrique(s) in 2012, a giant cluster of colored, transparent plastic discs, which overlap to form a colourful canopy.

=== List of selected exhibitions ===
1960–61

- First public commission of murals for a hotel on St. Croix (U.S. Virgin Islands). To date more than 180 exhibitions have followed since in the U.S.

1965

- Grand Prix at the Paris Biennale.
- Prix Lefranc de la Jeune Peinture (prize for young painters)

1966–67

- Events staged by the foursome Buren, Mosset, Parmentier & Toroni

1967

- First "affichages sauvages" (fly-posting) in the streets of Paris

1968

- First solo exhibit at Galerie Apollinaire, Milan

1968 / 1969 / 1971 / 1976

- Participated in "Prospect", Düsseldorf, Germany

1969

- Interruption, exhibition-presentation of 8 films on a Scopitone at the Galerie Yvon Lambert, Paris

1970

- Participated in the "10th Tokyo Biennale" International Exhibition (Tokyo, Japan)
- "Affichages sauvages" (fly-posting) in the Paris Métro, Tokyo subway, and New York City Subway
- First video work with the Gerry Schum gallery, Düsseldorf, Germany

1971

- "Eine Manifestation", first solo exhibition in a museum, Städtisches Museum, Mönchengladbach (Germany)
- "Peinture-Sculpture", work censored at the "VIth Guggenheim International" exhibition, Guggenheim Museum, New York

1972 / 1977 / 1982

- Participated in the Documenta, Kassel, Germany

1972 / 1974 / 1976 / 1978 / 1980 / 1984 / 1986 / 1993 / 1997 / 2003 / 2007

- Participated in the Venice Biennale

1973 / 2006

- Solo exhibitions at the MoMA, Oxford, UK

1975–1982

- First "Cabane Éclatée" ("splayed cabin") for the Städtisches Museum, Mönchengladbach, Germany

1975 / 1979 / 1980 / 1983 / 1998 / 1999 / 2004 / 2005

- Toile/Voile-Voile/Toile, boat races followed by museum displays of sail-canvasses in Berlin,
- Geneva, Lucerne, Villeneuve d'Ascq, Lyon-Villeurbanne, Tel-Aviv, Seville and Grasmere.

1976

- Three simultaneous exhibitions in the Netherlands: Stedelijk Van Abbemuseum, Eindhoven / Stedelijk Museum, Amsterdam / Kröller-Müller Museum, Otterlo

1982 / 1983 / 1984 / 1985 / 2000 / 2005

- Performances of Couleurs Superposées in Genazzano, Tokyo, Berne, Eindhoven, Venice, Villeneuve d’Ascq, New York and Paris.

1983

- Beginning of a close collaboration (more than 10 exhibitions, personal and group) with the Kanransha Gallery, Tokyo.

1986

- Les deux plateaux, sculpture in situ », public commission for the Central Court of the Palais Royal in Paris

Golden Lion for best pavilion at the 42nd Biennale in Venice

1989

- Solo exhibitions at the Touko Museum of Contemporary Art, Tokyo and the ICA in Nagoya (Japan)

1990

- "Living Treasure" prize bestowed by New Zealand

1991

- International Award for Best Artist » The Bad Wurtemberg Land, Stuttgart, Germany

1992

- Grand Prix National de Peinture, Paris

1994

- Déplacement-Jaillissement : d’une fontaine les autres », public commission for Place des Terreaux, Lyon, France
- Sens dessus-dessous, travail in situ et en mouvement » ("work in situ and in motion"), commissioned by Lyon Parc Auto for the Celestins parking lot in Lyon, France (prize for finest parking lot in Europe received in Budapest, Hungary

1996

- Transparence de la lumière, solo exhibition at the Mito Art Tower (Mito, Japan) 25 Porticoes : la couleur et ses reflets ("color and its reflections"), public commission for Odaiba Bay, Tokyo, Japan

2002

- Le Musée qui n’existait pas ("The museum that didn’t exist"), solo exhibition at the Pompidou Center in Paris, France

2003

- Transitions : works in situ », solo exhibition at the Municipal Museum of Art, Toyota (Japan)

2004–2006

- Six exhibitions in China (Beijing, Jinan, Hangzhu and Tianjin)

2005

- The eye of the storm, solo exhibition at the Guggenheim Museum, New York. Participated in the International Triennale of Contemporary Art, Yokohama.

2007

- Curator of « L’emprise du lieu », joint exhibition at Domaine Pommery, Reims, France
- Stage designer for the Sophie Calle exhibition at the French Pavilion of the Venice Biennale

2009

- A mancha humana / the human stain, public exhibition, CGAC – Centro Galego
- de Arte Contemporánea, Santiago de Compostela, Spain
- Constanti del classico nell’arte del XX e XXI secolo, public exhibition, Fondazione
- Puglisi Cosentino – Palazzo Valle, Catania Italy
- Daniel Buren- Artists Books, Fundacao Serralves, Porto, Portugal
- Voir Double, travail in situ, Xavier Hufkens, Brussels, Belgium
- Transmutation, travail in situ, in "Arte in memoria 5", Sinagoga di Ostia Antica, Ostia, Rome, Italy
- Vide ou Plein? Work in situ for two spaces, Art Dubai, Madinat Jumeirah, Dubai, UAE
- Le Vent souffle où il veut, Beaufort 03 – The Triennial of Contemporary Art by the Sea, Ostende, Belgium
- Arte Povera bis Mininal, Museum Wiesbaden, Wiesbaden, Germany
- Les Anneaux, Estuarie 2009, Ile de Nantes, France
- Daniel Buren, Neues Museum, Staatliches Museum für Kunst und Design in
- Nürnberg, Nuremberg, Germany
- 25 Obras, 17 Artistas, 4 Relatos, Centre d’Art la Panera, Lérida, Spain
- Just What It is, ZKM, Karlsruhe, Germany
- Play Van Abbe, Part 1: The game and the players", Stedelijk Van Abbemuseum,
- Eindhoven, Netherlands

2010

- Daniel Buren, Westwind Arbeiten Situes, Buchmann Galerie, Berlin
- Bilder uber Bilder, Museum Moderner Kunst Stiftung, MUMOK, Vienna
- In between Minimalisms – Play van Abbe, Part 2: Time Machines, Stedelijk van
- Abbemuseum, Eindhoven, Netherlands
- Daniel Buren, MUDAM, Luxembourg
- Malerei: Prozess und Wxpansion, MUMOK, Vienna
- Multiplications Work in Situ for a Synagogue, Synagogue Stommeln, Pulheim, Germany

2011

- Echos, travail in situ », solo exhibition at the Centre Pompidou-Metz, France

2012

- Monumenta at the Grand Palais, Paris, France

2014

- Défini, Fini, Infini / Installation on rooftop of Le Corbusier's Cité Radieuse, Marseilles, France

2015

- Daniel Buren. Come un gioco da bambini. lavoro in situ, Museo MADRE, Naples, Italy
- Les Fleches, travail in situ et en movement, Musée d’Amiens, Amiens France

2016

- Travaux inédits, 2016, Xavier Hufkens, Brussels, Belgium
- Daniel Buren. A Fresco, Bozar, Brussels, Belgium

2017

- Daniel Buren & Bettina Pousttchi, Kunsthalle Mainz, Mainz, Germany
- From Half Circles to the Full Circles: A Coloured Journey, MAMBO, Bogotá, Colombia
- Proyecciones / Retroproyecciones. Trabajos in situ. 2017, Centre Pompidou Málaga, Málaga, Spain

2018

- De la rotonda a la fuente. 5 colores para México, trabajo in situ. México 2018. Homenaje al Arquitecto Manuel Tolsá ("From the roundabout to the fountain. 5 colors for Mexico, in situ work. Mexico City 2018. Memorial to architect Manuel Tolsá") at Artz Pedregal mall, Mexico City
- The colors above our heads are under our feet as well, Artis- Naples, The Baker Museum, Naples, Florida, USA
- Like Child's Play, Carriageworks, Sydney, Australia
- Daniel Buren & Anish Kapoor, Galleria Continua, San Gimignano, Italy
- Quand le textile s’éclaire : Fibres optiques tissées. Travaux situés 2013–2014, Kunstsammlungen Chemnitz, Chemnitz, Germany

2019

- Les Garlands, in the group exhibition En Plein Air on the High Line in New York City
- Fibres Optiques – Diptyque: travail situé, Buchmann Lugano, Lugano, Switzerland
- STAGES biennial, Plug in Institute of Contemporary Art, Winnipeg, Canada
- Un Manifesto Colorato, Lavoro in situ, Progetto Per Ventotene, Italia
- Daniel Buren. De cualquier manera, trabajos in situ, Museo de Arte Italiano, Lima, Peru

2020

- Glass and Concrete, Manifestations of the Impossible, Marta Herford Museum, Herford, Germany

2022

- Daniel Buren: Going for a Walk in a Zigzag, EMMA – Espoo Museum of Modern Art, Espoo, Finland

=== Collections ===
Buren's works are part of several major public collections such as Museum voor Hedendaagse Kunst, Antwerp; Musée d'Art Moderne de la Ville de Paris; Tate Modern, London; the National Museum of Modern Art, Tokyo; Museo Guggenheim de Arte Moderno y Contemporaneo, Bilbao, and Moderna Museet, Stockholm.

== Recognition ==
In 1990, New Zealand honored him as a Living Treasure for their 150th anniversary and in 1991 he received the International Award for the Best Artist given in Stuttgart, Germany, followed by the Grand Prix National de Peinture in France, 1992. In 2007 Buren was awarded the Praemium Imperiale. He was one of the five artists shortlisted for the Angel of the South project in January 2008.

== List of permanent public installations ==
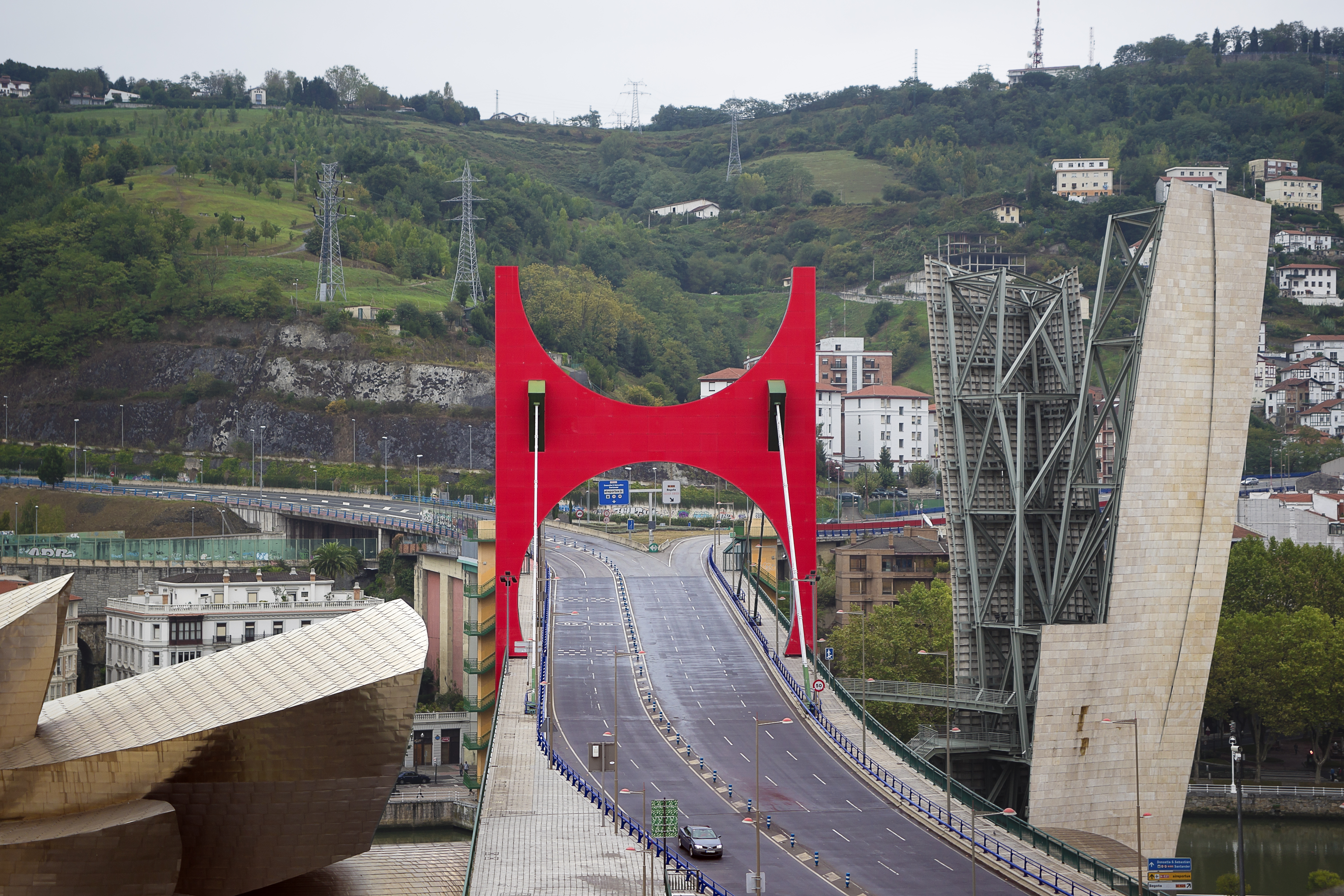
" L'arc Rouge " (The red arc), Guggenheim Museum Bilbao Spain

- 17 Peintures sur bois, 1960–1961. Travail in situ, Grapetree Bay Hôtel, Sainte-Croix, Iles Vierges, United States
- 4 Mosaïques, 1965. Travail in situ, Grapetree Bay Hôtel, Sainte-Croix, Iles Vierges, United States
- Lambris, 1980. Travail in situ – en collaboration avec Charles Vandenhove, architecte, Liège – Hôpital Universitaire, Liège, Belgium.
- In the Dining Room, 1982. Travail in situ, Chase Manhattan Bank, New York, United States
- Le Salon Royal, 1984–1986. Travail in situ – en collaboration avec Charles Vandenhove, architecte, Liège – Théâtre de la Monnaie, Bruxelles, Belgique.
- Neuf Couleurs au vent, 1984–1996. Travail in situ in "Québec 1534–1984", Québec, Canada, mai 1984. Installé de manière permanente depuis 1996, place Urbain-Baudreau-Graveline, Montréal, Canada.
- Les Deux Plateaux, 1985–1986. Sculpture in situ – avec l'architecte Patrick Bouchain, Paris –, cour d'honneur du Palais-Royal, Paris, France.
- Diagonale pour des bambous, 1986–1987. Travail in situ – en collaboration avec Alexandre Chemetov, architecte paysagiste, Paris –, Parc de la Villette, Paris, France.
- La Porte, 1987. Travail in situ, Domgasse, Münster, Germany.
- Frieze Paint, 1987: Peinture sur/sous plexiglas, Travail in situ, Refco collection, salle des marchés, New York City, United States
- Von der Heydt Museum : Das Cafe, 1987–1990. Travail in situ – avec l'assistance de M. Bussman, architecte -, Von der Heydt Museum, Wuppertal, Germany.
- La Marche des Fédérés Marseillais / Aux Couleurs de la ville, décembre 1989. 500 flammes de Marseille à Paris : 7 stations, 1989–1992, Travail in situ, réalisé dans sept villes : Marseille, Avignon, Valence, Vienne, Mâcon, Saulieu et Charenton, France. Travail détruit à la demande de l'artiste en 2006, par manque de maintenance de l'œuvre.
- Sans Titre, 1990. Travail in situ, Furkablicke Hôtel, Furkapasshöhe, Switzerland.
- Double rythme, juin 1991. Frise in situ, peinture acrylique et vinyle autoadhésif, Siège social Saarbrücken Kongresshalle, Saarbrücken, Germany
- Passage blanc et noir, 1992. Travail in situ – en collaboration avec Charles Vandenhove, architecte, Liège – De Liefde, Amsterdam, Netherlands.
- Horizontal cut – Vertical cut – Fragmented reflexion – Frise, 1992. Travail in situ, Hypo-Bank, Kempfenhausen, Germany
- Autour du Puits, 1993. Travail in situ, réalisé à l'occasion de "Trésors de voyage, XLV Biennale di Venezia", Monastero dei Padri Mechitaristi, Venice, Isola de San Lazaro degli Armeni, Venice, Italy
- Poser/Déposer/Exposer, 1993. Travail in situ – avec l'assistance de Jean-Michel Wilmotte, architecte, Paris – Café Richelieu, Galerie Richelieu, Grand Louvre, Paris, France
- From one Place to another. From one Material to another. Passages in and out, 1993–199. Travail in situ, Shinjuku I-Land, Tokyo, Japan
- Les Arches avril, 1994. Travail in situ, Southampton City Art Gallery, Southampton, Great Britain
- Sens Dessus-Dessous, 1994. Sculpture in situ et en mouvement – en collaboration avec Jean-Michel Wilmotte et avec l'assistance de Michel Targe, architecte, Lyon, Parc des Célestins, Lyon, France
- Déplacement-Jaillissement : D'une fontaine les Autres, 1994. Travail in situ – en collaboration avec Christian Drevet, architecte, Lyon et le concours d'Art/Entreprise Georges Verney-Carron, Villeurbanne –, Place des Terreaux, Lyon, France
- Diagonale pour des pilastres – Losanges pour des couleurs, 1994–1995. Travail in situ, Deutsche Telekom, Bonn, Germany
- D'une place l'autre : Placer, déplacer, ajuster, situer, transformer, 1994–1996. Travail in situ, Museum Boymans-van Beuningen, Rotterdam, Netherlands
- 25 Porticos : la couleur et ses reflets, 1996. Travail in situ – à l'initiative de Shiraishi Contemporary Art Inc., Tokyo, baie d'Odaiba, Saera Odaiba, Tokyo, Japan
- La Montée de la couleur et la Cascade de la couleur, 1996 : Travail in situ – à l'initiative de Brigitte Oetker, Leipzig Trade Fair, Germany
- Soleils et Garde-corps, 1996 : Travaux in situ – en collaboration avec Charles Vandenhove, Liège – Théâtre des Abbesses, Paris, France
- Diagonale pour un lieu 1996–1997 Travail in situ – avec l'assistance de Jean-Christophe Denise, architecte, Paris et de Henn Architekten Ingenieure –, Technische Universität, Munich, Germany
- Encoder-Décoder : du code à sa lecture, Couleurs, Reflets, Transparence, 1996–1997 : Travaux in situ – en collaboration avec Patrick Bouchain, architecte, Paris –, Thomson, Boulogne-Billancourt, France
- La Salle de concert – La Salle des miroirs 1996–1997 Travaux in situ – avec l'assistance de Jean-Christophe Denise, architecte, Paris et du cabinet d'architecture ABB, Francfort-sur-le-Main –, Dresdner Bank AG, Frankfurt, Germany
- Cabane Rouge aux Miroirs, 1996–2006, travail in situ, Musée de la Chartreuse, Douai, France
- Sans titre, aménagement de la caféteria, travail in situ, 2006, EACC (Espai d'Art Contemporani de Castelló), Castellón de la Plana, Spain
- Catalogue raisonné : T XIII-14
- À travers le miroir incliné : la couleur 1997, travaux in situ – à l'initiative de la galerie Hete Hünerman, Düsseldorf –, siège social, IKB (Industrial Kredit Bank), Düsseldorf, Allemagne
- Catalogue raisonné : T XIII-22
- Ipotesi su alcuni indizi – Part II 1987–1997 Travail in situ – avec l'assistance de Incontri Internazionali d'Arti, Rome, et d'Alberto Zanmatti, architecte, Rome – Museo di Capodimonte, Naples, Italy
- Catalogue raisonné : T XIII-14R
- Cercles, 1998 Travail in situ, Victoria Insurance, Düsseldorf, Allemagne, à l'initiative et avec l'assistance d'Achenbach Art Consulting, Düsseldorf, Germany
- Passage sous-bois, 1998 Travail in situ – à l'initiative de Sounjou Seo, Corée –, Kimpo Parc National, Kimpo, South Korea
- Sit down octobre, 1998 Travail in situ, Storm King Art Center, Mountainville (New York), United States
- From floor to ceiling and vice versa, 1998 Travail in situ – à l'initiative de Fumio Nanjo, Tokyo –, Obayashi Corporation, Tokyo, Japan
- Ohne Titel / Installation im Treppenhaus des Neuen Museums Weimar, 1996–1998 Travail in situ – à l'initiative de Paul Maenz, Cologne, Neues Museum Weimar, Kunstsammlungen zu Weimar, Weimar, Germany
- La Couleur : fut, a été, aurait pu être, pourrait être, serait, sera. Cinq petits jeux prospectifs et un rétrospectif, à découvrir à partir de photos-souvenirs préparées, mars 1999. Travail in situ permanent sur le web, Site internet : Entrée libre, Ministère de la culture et de la communication, Paris http://www.culture.fr/entreelibre/Buren
- Arc-en-ciel pour Fausto, 1999–2000 Travail in situ, – installation permanente au siège social de Radicichimica GmbH, de Polygone pour Poggibonsi : 180 drapeaux, 9 couleurs, réalisé in "Arte all Arte", 4e édition, Cassero della Fortezza di Poggio Imperiale, Poggibonsi, 1999 Troglitz, Germany
- Triangles coulissants, 1999 Travail in situ, siège social de Michaux Gestion, Lyon, France
- Trois Points de vue pour un dialogue – Œuvre en hommage au cardinal Decourtray, 1998–2000. Travail in situ – à l'initiative de The Jerusalem Foundation –, Mount Zion, Jerusalem, Israel.
- Par Transparence, 1997–2000. Travail in situ, Institut français, Rotterdam, Pays-Bas.
- White and Green Fence, 2001–2003. Travail in situ, The Farm, Gibbs Sculpture collection, Auckland, New Zealand
- Transparences colorées, 1999–2001. Travail in situ, Allianz Haupterverwaltung, Munich, Germany
- Sulle Vigne : punti di vista = Sur les Vignes: points de vue, 2001. Travail in situ, Castello di Ama, Lecchi in Chianti, Tuscany, Italy.
- La Grande Fenêtre, 1998–2001. Travail in situ – in collaboration with Joseph Paul Kleihues -, Bundesministerium für Arbeit und Sozialordnung, Berlin, Germany
- Au-dessus des vagues, l'horizon, 2001. Travail in situ, réalisé in "Quatrième exposition de sculpture contemporaine de Shenzhen / The Fourth Shenzhen Contemporary Sculpture Exhibition/Transplantation in situ", He Xiangning Art Museum, Shenzhen, China
- D'un Cercle à l'Autre: le paysage emprunté, 2001. Travail in situ, dans la ville de Luxembourg, Luxembourg
- Par Transparence, 2000. Travail in situ, Alliance Francaise, The Hague, Netherlands
- Rayonnant, 2000–2002. Travail in situ en collaboration avec Nicolas Guillot architecte-, Parc de la Cigalière, Sérignan, France.
- Fondation surgissante, 2000–2002. Travail in situ in collaboration with Claes Söderquist, Telenor Eiendom Fornebu AS, Oslo, Norway
- Prospettive, 2000–2005. Travail in situ Banca della Svizzera Italiana, Lugano, Tessin, Switzerland
- Projection colorée, 2001–2002. Travail in situ in collaboration with Dominique Perrault, Hôtel-de-Ville, Innsbruck, Austria
- White and Green Fence, 2001–2003. Travail in situ évolutif, The Farm, Gibbs Sculpture collection, Auckland, New Zealand
- Somewhere along the way, some colors, 2002–2003. Travail in situ – à l'initiative de Art Front Gallery, Tokyo –, pour Toki Messe, Niigata, Japan
- The Colors suspended: 3 exploded Cabins, 2002–2003. Travail in situ, Toyota Municipal Museum of Art, Toyota, Japan
- Prière de toucher : La signalétique tactile et visuelle – Pliages, 2000–2003. Travaux in situ – en collaboration avec la Fondation de France et le Bureau des Compétences et Désirs, IRSAM, Institut Régional des sourds et des aveugles, Marseille, France
- La Cabane Éclatée aux Quatre Salles, 2003–2005. Travail in situ pour Giuliano Gori – à l'initiative de Galleria Continua, San Gimignano –, Fattoria di Celle, Santomato di Pistoia, Italy
- Cerchi nell'aqua, 2004. Travaux in situ – en collaboration Naples Azienda risorse idriche di napoli Arin, Ponticelli, Naples, Italy
- Le Jardin imaginaire, 2004. Travail in situ – à l'initiative de Michle Lachowsky et Joel Benzakin –, Sint-Donatuspark, Louvain, Belgium
- [Sans Titre], 2004–2005. Travail in situ – à l'initiative de Blue Dragon Art Company, Tapei, Bin Jiang Junior High School, Taipei, Taiwan
- Tram/Trame, 2004–2006. Travail in situ – avec l'assistance de Jean-Christophe Denise, architecte, Paris, aux 14 stations de la ligne Est-Ouest du tramway de Mulhouse, Mulhouse, France
- Transparences et Projections colorées, 2005. Travail in situ, chapelle du Donjon de Vez, France
- Partitions colorées, 2005. Travaux in situ – à l'initiative de Giuliano Gori, Pistoia et avec l'assistance de Gianniantonio Vannetti, architecte, Florence –, Nuovo Padiglione di Emodialisi di Pistoia, Pistoia, Italy
- Monter / Descendre, 2005. Travail in situ – à l'initiative de Buchmann Galerie, Cologne/Berlin –, Wolfsburg Central Station, Germany
- La Caféteria, 2006. Travail in situ – à l'initiative de Michèle Lachowsky et Joel Benzakin –, EAAC-Musée de la Ville de Castellon, Castellon, Spain
- D'un Losange à L'autre, 2006. Unique wall painting at Hudiksvallsgatan 8 in Stockholm, Sweden
- La portée, 2007. Mosaic de 40 mètres de long en marbre blanc et granit noir, balisant l'entrée du nouveau Musée Fabre, Montpellier, Hérault, France
- Les Anneaux, 2007. Ensemble d'anneaux en métal bordant un quai, s'illuminant de différentes couleurs la nuit. Quai des Antilles, île de Nantes, Nantes, Loire-Atlantique, France
- Diamonds and Circles permanent works in situ, 2017. Colourful diamond and circle shapes, contrasting stripes in black and white, fixed to internal glass walls throughout the ticket hall. Tottenham Court Road, London, United Kingdom
- Public art installation for the MRT Circular Line Banqiao Station of Taipei Metro, 2019. New Taipei City, Taiwan.

== See also ==
- Institutional Critique
