= Niele Toroni =

Swiss painter (born 1937)

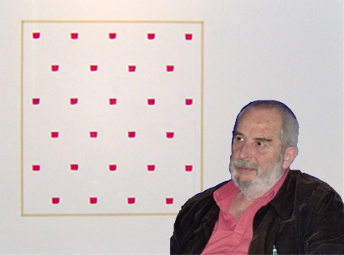

Niele Toroni (born 15 March 1937 in Muralto) is a Swiss painter. He lives and works in Paris.

== Work ==
In 1966 Toroni started a practice he calls "Travail-Peinture". Toroni's method, brushstrokes made with imprints of a no. 50 paintbrush repeated at perpendicular 30 centimeter intervals, was first shown at a debut in 1967 in Paris at an exhibition-performance at the Salon de la Jeune Peinture in the Musèe d'Art Moderne de la Ville de Paris. That same year, Toroni founded the BMPT (art group) together with Daniel Buren, Olivier Mosset, and Michel Parmentier. In works like Miroir d’Eau (1973) and Vert Wagon (1977), the imprints made with a n°50 paintbrush are repeated at regular intervals of 30 cm.

== Exhibitions ==
Toroni was included in documentas 7 (1982) and 9 (1992); São Paulo Art Biennial in 1991; and the Venice Biennale of 1976. Solo exhibitions include shows at Museum Kurhaus Kleve, Kleve, Germany in 2002; Niele Toroni: Histoires de Peinture at l'ARC/Musée d'Art Moderne de la Ville de Paris, in 2001; Musée Dhondt-Dhaenens, Deurle, and Avignon 2000, France in 2000. Other venues include: Base at Centro d'Arte, Florence and Niele Toroni, Siena Centro d'Arte Contemporani, Palazzo della Papesse, Siena in 1999; CAPC Musée d'Art Contemporain de Bordeaux in 1997; Gemeentemuseum Den Haag, and Stedelijk Museum, Amsterdam in 1994; Centre Georges Pompidou in 1991, and Musée d'Art Moderne de la Ville de Paris in 1990; Villa Arson, Nice and the Museum of Grenoble in 1987. In 1995 he completed a Public Art Project on Rochdale Canal, Manchester, England.

Toroni is represented by Marian Goodman Gallery in London, New York and Paris.

== Collections ==
Toroni's works are part of major collections, including the Museum of Modern Art, New York; the Strasbourg Museum of Modern and Contemporary Art, Strasbourg; the Kupferstichkabinett, Berlin; the Kunstmuseum Luzern; Migros Museum für Gegenwartskunst, Zürich.

== Recognition ==
Toroni received the Rubens Prize of the City of Siegen in 2017, the Prix Meret Oppenheim in 2012, the Wolfgang Hahn Prize, Cologne, Germany in 2003 and the French Vermeil Medal, awarded by the City of Paris in 2001.
