= Claes Söderquist =

Swedish artist and filmmaker (born 1939)

Claes Söderquist (born February 10, 1939) is a Swedish artist and filmmaker. Söderquist filmed on Alcatraz in 1970 during the Occupation of Alcatraz by Indians of All Tribes.

== Life ==
Claes Söderquist was born in Stockholm, Sweden, and grew up near Kristianstad in the South of Sweden. He studied painting at the University College of Arts, Crafts and Design (1960–1964), and at The Royal Institute of Art (1964–1969) in Stockholm. Söderquist has also been working in television, and as a curator and art advisor in Scandinavia. His work has been exhibited at Galerie Nordenhake, Berlin, and at Moderna Museet, Stockholm. A retrospective of his work at The Royal Academy of Art, Stockholm (2013) and at Kristianstad Konsthall in 2014 brought attention to his work as one of the most important but little known experimental filmmakers in Sweden....

== Films ==
In 1968 Söderquist shot Travelogue. Portraits from a Journey (1969), a travel documentary about the artists Robert Bechtle, Howard Kanovitz, Edward Kienholz, Richard McLean, Alfred Leslie, Lowell Nesbitt and filmmaker Robert Nelson. In 1970 Söderquist got permission to go to Alcatraz during the Occupation by Indians of All Tribes to film and conduct interviews. The film, The Return of the Buffalo (1970–2012) was not finished until 2012 when he returned to the island to film Alcatraz – The Return (2013). Influenced by Canadian filmmaker Michael Snow he filmed Landscape (1985–1987), Passages (2001) and Labyrinth (2013). He has also written and directed short films for Swedish television such as Letters from Silence (Briefe aus dem Schweigen) (1990) about the German-Jewish writer Kurt Tucholsky’s exile in Sweden. The German version of Letters from Silence is narrated by German actor Bruno Ganz.

== Selected filmography ==
- I frack (1964)
- Travelogue. Portraits from a Journey (1969)
- Epitaph (1981)
- Landscape (1985–1987)
- Letters from Silence (1989)
- Passages – Portrait of a City (2001)
- The Return of the Buffalo (1970–2012)
- Alcatraz – The Return (2013)
- Labyrinth (2013)
