= Myung-Ok Han =

South Korean visual artist (born 1958)

- Born: South Korea
- Education: 1990
- Known for: Installations, performances, drawings
- Movement: Installation art, Performance art, Drawing
- Website: Official website

Myung-Ok Han is a visual artist and performance artist born in 1958 in South Korea. She lives and works at La Ruche in Paris, France.

== Biography ==
Born in 1958 in South Korea, Myung-Ok Han moved to France in 1986 and continued her studies at the École nationale supérieure d'art de Dijon.

There she discovered the Arte Povera movement as well as the Gutai group.

Her installations feature materials such as cotton thread, reflecting her Korean heritage, as well as everyday objects from the kitchen (bowls, plates, spoons).

Her approach with thread explores the notion of time: she patiently winds cotton into bowls, in a simple and repetitive gesture.

In 1996, the magazine Ninety: Art in the 90s devoted its issue 20 to her, alongside Jean Le Gac. In this issue, Olivier Kaeppelin wrote an article about her entitled “A Line”.

In 1997, her work *Neuf cuillères* was acquired by the Fonds national d'art contemporain (FNAC).

Her work has been exhibited in France, notably at the Musée d'Art moderne de Paris during the exhibition "Paris pour escale" in 2000, in Switzerland at the Kunsthalle Bern in 2001, in South Korea during the exhibition "At the Groove of Time" at the Busan Museum of Modern Art in 2007, as well as in Australia, as part of the 3rd Asia Pacific Triennial of Contemporary Art (APT3) in Brisbane in 1999.

=== Quotes ===
" When I set to work, I think of nothing, I can see nothing, I have an acute perception of movement, noises and even silences. While observing everything, I gradually let myself go".

== Solo exhibitions (selection) ==
- 1996 – 3 Drawings, Hyundai Gallery, Seoul, South Korea
- 1996 – Lost Time, Édouard Manet Municipal Gallery, Gennevilliers; Claude Samuel Gallery, Paris, France
- 2001 – Oubliettes, Projekt Raum, Kunsthalle Bern, Switzerland
- 2001 – When All We Have Is Love, Guy Bärtschi Gallery, Art Brussels, Belgium
- 2003 – Guy Bärtschi Gallery, Geneva, Switzerland ISBN 2940287112
- 2005 – Time Against Time, Korean Cultural Center, Paris, France
- 2008 – Good Luck Charm, Project Room, Guy Bärtschi Gallery (Wilde Gallery), Geneva, Switzerland
- 2009 – Good Luck Charm, Municipal Gallery of the City of Vitry-sur-Seine, France
- 2013 – From There, Galerie Grand E’terna, Paris, France

== Group exhibitions (selection) ==
- 1995 – Salon de Montrouge
- 1996 – Choice of 6 Artists, Gallery Hyundai, Seoul, South Korea
- 1997 – Gwangju Biennale, South Korea
- 1998 – Poetics of Time, Ho-Am Art Museum, Seoul, South Korea
- 1998 – Interlacing & the Envelope, Villa du Parc, Annemasse, France
- 1999 – Ars Aevi, Museum of Modern and Contemporary Art, Sarajevo, Bosnia and Herzegovina
- 1999 – 3rd Asia-Pacific Triennial of Contemporary Art, Queensland Art Gallery, Brisbane, Australia
- 2000 – Paris Escale, Museum of Modern Art of the City of Paris
- 2000 – Zero In, Museum of Contemporary Art Taipei, Taiwan
- 2004 – France – Land of Welcome, Jerusalem, Israel
- 2005 – Interweaving Cultures, Jim Thompson Foundation, Bangkok, Thailand
- 2005 – Emergency Biennale in Chechnya, Palais de Tokyo, Paris / Brussels, Belgium / Bolzano, Italy
- 2006 – At the Groove of Time, Museum of Modern Art, Busan, South Korea
- 2006 – Performance Biennale Infr’action, Sète, France
- 2006 – Korean Suites, Passage de Retz, Paris
- 2008 – Emergency Biennale in Chechnya / World Tour, stop 10 San Francisco (CA), United States / stop 11 Bialystok, Poland
- 2008 – Drawing Woman, Johyun Gallery, Seoul and Busan, South Korea
- 2008 – Contemporary Korean Artists in Paris, Seoul Arts Center, Seoul, South Korea
- 2009 – Fragile, Lands of Empathy, Musée d'art moderne (Saint-Étienne), France – Accademia d’Ungheria, Palazzo Falconieri, Rome, Italy – Fragile, Daejeon Museum of Art, South Korea
- 2010 – The Soul of the Line, Ungno Lee Art Museum, Daejeon, South Korea ISBN 9788992017510
- 2011 – Reliefs, Fondation Espace Écureuil for Contemporary Art, Toulouse, France
- 2012 – 10 Years of the Jean Brolly Gallery, Jean Brolly Gallery
- 2013 – Drawings and Works on Paper, Jean Brolly Gallery
- 2014 – Wooson Gallery, Art Stage Singapore
- 2016 – SAM, Galerie des grands bains douches de la plaine, Marseille

=== International Art Fairs ===
- FIAC, Paris (1998–2005), with Guy Bärtschi Gallery
- ARCO (art fair), Madrid (2004), with Guy Bärtschi Gallery
- Art Brussels, Belgium (2002–2004), with Guy Bärtschi Gallery
- Art Cologne, Cologne (2002), with Guy Bärtschi Gallery

== Public collections ==
- Fonds national d’Art Contemporain, France (1997)
- Modern and Contemporary Art Fund of the City of Gennevilliers, France (1998)
- Samsung Foundation, Seoul, South Korea (1999)
- Museum of Modern and Contemporary Art, Sarajevo, Bosnia and Herzegovina (1999)
- Claudine and Jean-Marc Salomon Foundation, France (2003)

== Bibliography ==
- Michel Enrici, “SAM”, Galerie des Grands Bains Douches de la Plaine, Marseille, 2016.
- Lóránd Hegyi, “Fragile. Lands of Empathy”
- Philippe Piguet, “Myung-Ok Han or the possibility of being in the world”, Municipal Gallery of Vitry-sur-Seine, 2009.
- Kim Airyung, “Drawing Woman”, Johyun Gallery, Korea, 2008.
- Kim Airyung, “Korean Suites”, Passage de Retz, Paris, 2006.
- Kim Young Ho, “Seven Perspectives on Desire”, Espace Sol, Seoul, Korea, 2006.
- Kang Sun Hak, “At the Groove of Time”, Busan Museum of Modern Art, Korea, 2006.
- Ann Coxon, “Interweaving Cultures”, Jim Thompson Art Center, Bangkok, Thailand, 2005 ISBN 9789749300213.
- Catherine Francblin, “Praise of Lost Time”, Korean Cultural Center, Paris, 2005.
- Marie Shek, France Land of Welcome, The New Gallery, Jerusalem, Israel, 2004.
- Laurence Chauvy, “Wonders of Rice and Cotton in Geneva”, Le Temps, 2003.
- André Dpraz, “Myung-Ok Han or the Objectification of a Poetics” and Evelyne Jouanno, “Recreating Space and Time”, Galerie Guy Bärtschi, Geneva, Switzerland, 2003 ISBN 2940287112.
- Evelyne Jouanno, “Flower Power or the Creative Strategies of Five Asian Women Artists Based in Paris”, MAKE: The Magazine of Women's Art (Issue 92), 2002.
- Evelyne Jouanno, “Paris Escale”, Museum of Modern Art of the City of Paris, 2000.
- Margueritte De Savran, “Selected Drawings”, General Council of Seine Saint Denis, France, 2000.
- Soyeon Ahn, “3rd Asia Pacific Triennale of Contemporary Art”, Queensland Art Gallery, Brisbane, Australia, 1999.
- Sylvaine Van den Esch, “In the Direction of the Thread”, Villa du Parc, Annemasse, France, 1998.
- Byung Hak Rhu, Kum Ho Art Gallery, Seoul, Korea, 1998.
- Seungduk Kim, Sarajevo 2000, Museum moderner Kunst Stiftung Ludwig, Vienna, Austria, 1998 ISBN 3900776776.
- Kwang Suk Cho, Regard Image, Gwangju Biennale, Korea, 1997.
- Olivier Kaeppelin, “A Line”, Catherine Flohic, in Ninety: Art of the 90s No. 20, France, 1996 ISBN 978-2908787238.
- Olivier Kaeppelin, “Perpetual”, Édouard Manet Municipal Gallery, Gennevilliers / Claude Samuel Gallery, Paris, 1996.
- Nedim Gürsel, “The Thread of Myung-Ok Han”, General Council of Seine Saint Denis, France, 1995.
