= Ninety: Art in the 90s =

Ninety : art des années 90 / art in the 90's was a French bimonthly contemporary art magazine published from 1990 to 2000. It featured articles in both French and English.

== Overview ==
Publisher: Jean-Luc Flohic
Editor-in-chief: Catherine Flohic
Jean-Luc Chalumeau was the artistic advisor of the magazines *Eighty* and *Ninety* from 1983 to 1996.

The guest artists featured in each issue are mostly established figures in the art world. Many art critics contributed depending on the featured artists, including Olivier Kaeppelin, Daniel Dobbels, Nicolas Bourriaud, and Éric Troncy.

The magazine was published by Eighty Magazine Sarl, registered in the French Trade and Companies Register under number 328.648.035, and recognized by the French Press Commission (Commission paritaire des publications et agences de presse) under number 66071. It was distributed by Flohic Éditions.

== Eighty Magazine ==
Ninety is the continuation of the magazine Eighty Magazine: painters in France in the 1980s. It was active from 1984 to 1990 and focused on French pictorial art of that decade.

From issue no. 1 (December–January 1984) to no. 33 (1990), each issue presented two important painters of the decade: Peter Klasen, Jacques Monory, Jean Hélion, Gérard Fromanger, Robert Combas, Jean-Michel Alberola, Jean Dubuffet, Gérard Garouste, Martial Raysse, Jean Le Gac, Hervé Télémaque, Erró, Pierre Soulages, etc.

There were 33 issues, plus a special issue "Eighty: Sculpture of the 1980s" by Véronique Schmeller, which presented 20 international sculptors who shaped the 1980–1990s, including Joseph Beuys, Christian Boltanski, Daniel Buren, Christo, Tony Cragg, Richard Deacon, Barry Flanagan, Dan Flavin, Jannis Kounellis, Sol LeWitt, Richard Long, Markus Lüpertz, Mario Merz, Mimmo Paladino, Giulio Paolini, A.R. Penck, Jean-Pierre Raynaud, Richard Serra, Jean Tinguely, Bill Woodrow.

Ninety precedes the magazine Twenty One: Art of the New Millennium (2001).

== Issue Organization ==
Following the same model as Eighty, the magazine is distinguished by a careful presentation, with numerous color reproductions, and covers various aspects of the artists' work, including interviews, analyses, and critical studies.

Ninety is a magazine dedicated to contemporary art of the 1990s. Each issue features a section on current artistic events, followed by dossiers presenting two artists. Each dossier includes about a dozen pages illustrated with photographs of the works, a text by Catherine Flohic, a critique by a guest contributor, and a biographical note. The cover is shared between the two artists, one on the front and the other on the back.

For example, the **first issue (1990)** brings together two symmetrically structured dossiers: Antoni Tàpies and Bernd and Hilla Becher, with texts by Catherine Flohic and Jean-Luc Chalumeau, numerous black-and-white and color illustrations, full-page plates, and interviews on events such as international contemporary art fairs.

The **17th issue (1995)** features Eric Fischl and Pascal Simonet, with texts by Catherine Flohic, black-and-white and color reproductions, as well as interviews on artistic events.

These issues now constitute a reference collection on art of the 1990s.

== List of Issues ==
| No. | Year | Artists | Texts / Critiques | References |
|---|---|---|---|---|
| 1 | 1990 | Antoni Tàpies, Bernd and Hilla Becher | Catherine Flohic, Jean-Luc Chalumeau | OCLC 77115284 |
| 2 | 1990 | Enzo Cucchi, Rob Scholte | Jean-Luc Chalumeau | ISBN 978-2-908787-02-3 |
| 3 | 1991 | Sigmar Polke, Doug and Mike Starn | Jean-Luc Chalumeau, Achille Bonito Oliva | ISBN 978-2-908787-02-3 |
| 4 | 1991 | Philippe Favier, Peter Howson | Yves Michaud | OCLC 77115197 |
| 5 | 1991 | David Salle, Frédérique Lucien | Jean-Luc Chalumeau, Alfred Pacquement | OCLC 77115198 |
| 6 | 1991 | Miquel Barceló, Jacques Charlier | Jean-Luc Chalumeau | OCLC 493335118 |
| 7 | 1992 | Gérard Garouste, Bertrand Lavier | Jean-Luc Chalumeau, Marie-Claude Beaud | OCLC 867843758 |
| 8 | 1992 | Mimmo Paladino, Elisabeth Dugne | Marie-Paule Ferrandi, Catherine Flohic, Jean-Luc Chalumeau, Régis Debray | ISBN 978-2-908787-08-5 |
| 9 | 1992 | Sophie Calle, Jiří Georg Dokoupil | Catherine Flohic, Jean-Luc Chalumeau | ISBN 978-2-908787-09-2 |
| 10 | 1993 | Joan Mitchell | Catherine Flohic | ISBN 978-2-908787-10-8 |
| 11 | 1993 | James Brown (artist), Damien Cabanes | Jean-Luc Chalumeau, Catherine Flohic, Jean-Louis Froment | ISBN 978-2-908787-12-2 |
| 12 | 1993 | Eugène Leroy, Françoise Vergier | Catherine Flohic, Jean-Luc Chalumeau | ISBN 978-2-908787-13-9 |
| 13 | 1994 | Markus Lüpertz, Fabrice Hybert | Marie-Paule Ferrandi, Catherine Flohic, Jean-Luc Chalumeau, Thierry Sigg | ISBN 978-2-908787-14-6 |
| 14 | 1994 | Jean-Pierre Raynaud, Carole Benzaken | Jean-Luc Chalumeau, Catherine Flohic, Jean de Loisy | ISBN 978-2-908787-15-3 |
| 15 | 1994 | Louise Bourgeois | Catherine Flohic, Daniel Dobbels | ISBN 978-2-908787-16-0 |
| 16 | 1995 | Francesco Clemente, Georges Touzenis | Jean-Luc Chalumeau, Catherine Flohic | ISBN 978-2-908787-17-7 |
| 17 | 1995 | Eric Fischl, Pascal Simonet | Catherine Flohic, Daniel Abadie, Jean-Luc Chalumeau | ISBN 978-2-908787-18-4 |
| 18 | 1995 | Ilya Kabakov, Max Neumann | Jean-Luc Chalumeau, Catherine Flohic | ISBN 978-2-908787-19-1 |
| 19 | 1995 | Cy Twombly, Pascal Convert | Jean-Luc Chalumeau | Bibliothèque Beaux-Arts Marseille |
| 20 | 1996 | Jean Le Gac, Myung-Ok Han | Catherine Flohic, Agathe Rondinella, Olivier Kaeppelin | ISBN 978-2-908787-23-8 |
| 21 | 1996 | Jean-Pierre Pincemin, Jean-Michel Othoniel | Catherine Flohic | ISBN 978-2-908787-24-5 |
| 22 | 1996 | Philippe Cognée, Tony Cragg | Catherine Flohic | ISBN 978-2-908787-25-2 |
| 23 | 1997 | Roman Opalka, Sylvie Blocher | Guy Tosatto, Marc Donnadieu | ISBN 978-2-908787-26-9 |
| 24 | 1997 | Georg Baselitz, Marc Couturier | Catherine Flohic | ISBN 978-2-908787-27-6 |
| 25 | 1997 | Rebecca Horn, Yan Pei-Ming | Catherine Flohic | ISBN 978-2-908787-28-3 |
| 26 | 1998 | Ernest Pignon-Ernest, Franck Chalendard | Éric de Chassey | OCLC 493831062 |
| 27 | 1998 | José María Sicilia, Cornelia Parker | — | ISBN 978-2-908787-40-5 |
| 28 | 1998 | Luc Tuymans, Gilles Barbier | Georges Touzenis | ISBN 978-2-908787-41-2 |
| 29 | 1998 | Gerhard Richter, Lee Mingwei | — | OCLC 493838357 |
| 30 | 1998 | Georges Rousse, Rirkrit Tiravanija | — | Bibliothèque Beaux-Arts Marseille |
| 31 | 1999 | Gilbert & George, Rachel Whiteread | — | ISBN 978-2-908787-44-3 |
| 32 | 1999 | Marlene Dumas, Marie-Ange Guilleminot | Catherine Flohic, Dominic van den Boogerd | ISBN 978-2-908787-45-0 |
| 33 | 1999 | Marina Abramovic, Patrick Corillon | Catherine Flohic, Nicolas Bourriaud, Denys Zacharopoulos | OCLC 959137509 |
| 34 | 1999 | Michelangelo Pistoletto, Djamel Tatah | — | ISBN 978-2-908787-47-4 |
| 35 | 2000 | Jean-Marc Bustamante, Mariko Mori | — | ISBN 978-2-908787-48-1 |
| 36 | 2000 | Gloria Friedmann, Valérie Favre | Catherine Flohic, Éric Troncy | ISBN 978-2-908787-49-8 |
