= Cynthia Carlson =

American painter (born 1942)

- Born: 1942 (age 83–84); Chicago, Illinois, U.S.
- Known for: Painting
- Movement: Pattern and Decoration
- Website: cynthiacarlsonartist.com

Cynthia Carlson (born 1942) is an American visual artist, living and working in New York.

== Personal life and education ==
Carlson was born in 1942 in Chicago, Illinois. She graduated from Kelvyn Park High School in Chicago and then attended the School of the Art Institute of Chicago. She received her BFA in 1965. She moved to New York City and attended Pratt Institute in Brooklyn, NY, graduating with her MFA in 1967. She is married to Robert Gino Bertoletti.

== Career ==
In the 1960s, Carlson's art was influenced by the work of The Hairy Who and Chicago Imagists artists in Chicago. During the 1970s, she was a pioneer of the "Pattern and Decoration" group in New York City, in which the Feminist movement played an important role. Mainly a painter, her work has evolved within a number of different stylistic concerns including installation, sculpture, and public art commissions.

Carlson's career has included solo museum exhibitions: Homage to the Academy Building, Pennsylvania Academy of the Fine Arts (1979), Philadelphia, PA; Insideout Oberlin, Allen Memorial Museum (1980), Oberlin, OH; Eastlake Then and Now, Hudson River Museum (1981), Yorkers, NY; Four False Facades, Southeastern Center for Contemporary Art (1981), Winston-Salem, NC; Currents, Milwaukee Art Museum (1982), Milwaukee, WI; Picture That In Miami, Lowe Art Museum (1982), Coral Gables, FL; The Monument Series, Albright-Knox Art Gallery, Buffalo, NY; Queens Museum, Flushing, NY; and The Dog Show, Neuberger Museum of Art, Purchase College, SUNY, NY and forty-seven one person gallery exhibitions in Chicago, Philadelphia and New York, including Hundred Acres Gallery (1975), New York, NY; The Gingerbread House, Graduate Center (1977), CUNY, NY; Pam Adler Gallery (1979, 1981, 1983), New York, NY; Vietnam: Sorry About That, University Art Galleries, Wright State University (1988), Dayton, OH; and Freedman Gallery (1989), Albright College, Reading, PA; Over Time, Essex Flowers Gallery (2018), New York, NY; EDGES INSIDEOUT Duane Thomas Gallery (2024), New York, NY

Her work was included in numerous group exhibitions and biennials in museums and galleries in North America and Europe, including Twenty-Six Contemporary Women Artists, Aldrich Contemporary Art Museum (1971), Ridgefield, CN, curated by Lucy Lippard; Extraordinary Realities, Whitney Museum of American Art (1973), New York, NY, curated by Robert M. Doty; Pattern Painting, P.S.1 (1977), Long Island City, NY; Contemporary Women: Consciousness & Content, Brooklyn Museum (1977), NY, curated by Joan Semmel; Rooms, Hayden Gallery (1981), Massachusetts Institute of Technology, Cambridge, MA. Three rooms exhibit with Richard Haas and Richard Artschwager; War and Memory: In the Aftermath of Vietnam, Washington Project for the Arts (1987), Washington, D.C.; Pattern & Decoration: An Ideal Vision in American Art, 1975-1985, Hudson River Museum (2007), Yonkers, curated by Anne Swartz; That Was Then, This Is Now, CUE Art Foundation (2010), New York, NY, curated by Robert Storr & Irving Sandler; and Pattern, Crime & Decoration, Museum of Contemporary Art (2018-2019), Geneva, Switzerland, and Le Consortium, Dijon, France, curated by Franck Gautherot and Seungduk Kim.

Her public commissions include, LA: City of Angels (1993), Los Angeles Metro Rail System through the Los Angeles County Transportation Art for the Rail Transit Program, Los Angeles, CA and Gingerbread House (1977), Artpark, in Lewiston, NY, a 13-feet high life size sculpture.

She taught for 40 years at the University of the Arts in Philadelphia, and at the Queens College, CUNY, where she is professor emerita. She served on the Artist Advisory Committee of the Marie Walsh Sharpe Art Foundation and on the Advisory Committee of the Ree Morton Estate. She has lived in Italy for a year at a time on several occasions, as well as traveling extensively in Europe and elsewhere.

In the early 1970s, for several years, she traveled throughout the United States documenting Environmental Folk Art lectured extensively on the material. In 2012, she donated the entire collection of visuals and documents to the L'Art Brut Museum in Lausanne, Switzerland.

== Public Collections ==
- Metropolitan Museum of Art, New York, NY
- Guggenheim Museum, New York, NY
- New Museum, New York, NY
- Brooklyn Museum, Brooklyn, NY
- Albright-Knox Art Gallery, Buffalo, NY
- Philadelphia Museum of Art, Philadelphia, PA
- Pennsylvania Academy of the Fine Arts, Philadelphia, PA
- Allentown Art Museum, Allentown, PA
- Museum of Contemporary Art, Chicago, IL
- The Art Institute of Chicago, Chicago, IL
- Allen Memorial Art Museum, Oberlin, OH
- University of Colorado Art Museum, Boulder, CO
- Milwaukee Art Museum, Milwaukee, WI
- Eli and Edythe Broad Art Museum, Michigan State University, East Lansing, MI
- Polk Museum of Art, Lakeland, FL
- San Antonio Museum of Art, San Antonio, TX

== Awards ==
- 2020 Pollock-Krasner Foundation Award
- 1993 Foundation Award, Residency for Study And Conference Center, Rockefeller Foundation, Bellagio Center , Bellagio, Italy
- 1975, 1978, 1987 National Endowment for the Arts Fellowship
- 1977 Natural Heritage Trust Artist-in-Residence Grant, Artpark, Lewiston, NY
- 1976 The MacDowell Colony Fellowship
