= Nicolas Trembley =

Swiss curator (born 1965)

- Born: 1965 (age 60–61)
- Education: University of Lausanne; Paris 8 University Vincennes-Saint-Denis (MA)
- Occupations: Curator; art critic; art advisor; writer
- Known for: Managing the Syz Collection

Nicolas Trembley (born 1965) is a Paris and Geneva-based curator, art critic, art advisor and writer. He manages the Syz Collection based in Geneva, Switzerland. Trembley is credited with bringing the medium of video into contemporary art and institutional discourse in the late 1980s and early 1990s.

== Early life and education ==
Trembley studied sociology and anthropology at the Lausanne University in Geneva in the early 1980s. He studied alongside Edgar Morin and Georges Balandier, notable figures in questioning the western-centric understanding of art history and culture. During this time, he interned at 1st International Video Week Festival now called the Biennale de l'Image en Mouvement (BIM).

In 1995 he moved to Paris and studied at University of Paris 8 where he obtained a Master's in Cinematography and Video Art. He interned at the Centre Pompidou. Afterwards, he took a full-time position at the National Museum.

== Work ==
In 1990 Trembley started at the Musée National d'art Moderne, Centre Pompidou during the exhibition "Passages de l'image" curated by Catherine David, Raymond Bellour and Christine Van Assche that showcased works by pioneer artists such as Dan Graham or Peter Campus. Trembley became a production assistant in the New Media department and collaborated with artists such as Chris Marker and Julia Scher .

In 1994 Trembley and Stéphanie Moisdon founded bdv (bureau des vidéos), a contemporary video art distribution company. bdv has worked with numerous international artists, filmmakers and critics, such as duo Peter Fischli/ David Weiss, Hans Ulrich Obrist, Pipilotti Rist, Elke Krystufek, David Lamelas, John Baldessari, Sylvie Fleury. The project democratized and preserved the legacy of video art as a medium of its own. The archives from bdv are at the LUMA Foundation in Arles, France.

Until 1996 he was assistant curator and part of the acquisition board of the New Media department at the Centre Georges Pompidou.

In 2004 Trembley joined the Centre Culturel Suisse (Swiss Institute) with director Michel Ritter as chief curator in Paris. He organized exhibitions such as "Swiss Swiss Democracy" by Thomas Hirschhorn (2004), John Armleder: Jacques Garcia (2008), Around Max Bill with Wade Guyton (2008). He curated shows with Shirana Shabazzi, Valentin Carron, Carol Bove, Andro Wekua, Walter Pfeiffer, Jean-Frédéric Shnyder and Mai-Thu Perret.

In 2015 Trembley curated the Brioni Campaign photographed by Collier Schorr with artists, dealers and curators like Seth Price, John Armleder, Daniel Buchholz.

Since 2018 Trembley has been part of the acquisition committee of the Musée d'art Moderne de Paris and Frac Normandie.

He is a regular contributor for publications such as Self Service, Artforum, and Numéro.

== The Syz Collection ==
In 2009 Trembley was appointed head curator at the Syz Collection in Geneva. Initiated in the early 1980s by Suzanne and Eric Syz in New York, the collection is showcasing over 300 works within its headquarters with pieces from Andy Warhol, George Condo, Rosemarie Trockel, Wolfgang Tillmans, Cindy Sherman or Isa Genzken.

Trembley collaborated with Suzanne Syz Art Jewels and her commissioned jewel boxes with artists John Armleder, Sylvie Fleury, Alex Israel, Kerstin Brätsch and Matthew Lutz-Kinoy.

== Craft ==
=== German Ceramics ===
In 2010–12 Trembley curated the exhibition "Sgrafo vs Fat Lava: Ceramics and Porcelains Made in West Germany, 1960–1980" displaying almost one hundred pieces from a collection, at the Centre d'Edition Contemporaine in Geneva, the Frac Champagne-Ardenne, Galerie Kreo Paris, Galerie Gisela Capitain, EXD Biennale, Zachary Currie New York. The exhibition and project was notable for ejecting the hierarchy between art mediums a common practice in Western art history.

=== The Mingei Movement ===
Trembley organized a series of exhibitions related to the Mingei movement, particularly calling into question its legacy in contemporary art. The concept of Mingei was established in 1925 by Japanese philosopher Sōetsu Yanagi and potters Kanjiro Kawai and Shoji Hamada. It values the beauty and simplicity of folk art.

"Mingei: Are You Here" in 2013/14 at Pace gallery In London and New York, "Mingei Now" at Sokyo Gallery in Kyoto, Japan In 2019, "The Mingei" at Taka Ishii Gallery in Hong Kong in 2020 and "Mingei Asia Now" at la Monnaie de Paris in 2022.

He also curated craft related projects, "(LOVE) Craft" at gallery Air de Paris, showcasing artists such as Pati Hill, Jef Geys, Leonor Antunes ... In 2021, "Expanded Craft", textiles and ceramics at Croy Nielsen with Noa Eshkol and Natsuko Uchino, in 2022, "Ceramics by Wifredo Lam' at the Musée Guimet, the National Museum of Asian Arts. In 2023, Trembley curated an exhibition dedicated to craft at Francesca Pia Gallery in Zürich. The group show 'CRAFT' created a discussion between artworks and objects of different craft artists from distinct periods and mediums.

He has been appointed as the Craft curator for Art Paris, from 2024.

== Exhibition History ==
- "Ici Paris (Europe)", video program, Centre George Pompidou, Paris, France, co-curated with Stéphanie Moisdon and Christine van Assche, 1993
- "Pas de danse!" Fondation Cartier pour l'Art Contemporain, Paris, France co-curated with Stéphanie Mosidon, 1994
- "Show Must Go On" at the Fondation Cartier, Paris, France, co-curated with Stéphanie Moisdon, 1995
- "La Mort en ce Jardin", Pompidou for the 5th biennale de l'Image en Mouvement, Geneva, Switzerland. « X-Y Nouveaux médias », co-curated with Stéphanie Moisdon, 1995
- "videostore!", Bricks & Kicks, Vienna, Austria, 1998
- "ZAC 99," Musée d'Art Moderne de la ville de Paris, Paris, France, co-curated with Stéphanie Moisdon Laurent Bossé, 1999
- "Projection Room", Paris Photo, Paris, France, 2004
- "Domino," Air de Paris Gallery, 2006
- Biennale of Lyon and "L'histoire D'une Décennie Qui N'est Pas Encore Nommée," 2007
- "Shirana Shahbazi," Centre Culturel Suisse, 2008
- "Telephone Paintings" Art Basel, 2012
- "Socles" HEAD, Geneva, Switzerland, 2014
- "Platform," Almine Rech, Brussels, Belgium, 2014
- The Nineties Section at Frieze London 2016
- "Wade Guyton," Consortium of Dijon and Mamco in Geneva, Switzerland, 2017
- "John M Armleder," Almine Rech, New York, New York, 2017
- "Atelier d'artistes," Christie's, New York, New York, 2019
- "n°65 Not That I Can't Wait for It," Freedman Fitzpatrick, Paris, France 2019
- "Abstraction(s)," Song Museum and Almine Rech, Beijing, China, 2019
- "Back to The Future," Artissima, Torino, Italy, 2019

== Publications ==
- 1995, X-Y Nouveaux médias, by Stéphanie Moisdon, Nicolas Trembley, Christine Van Assche et al., Centre Georges Pompidou.
- 1996, Autoreverse Phase 4, vidéo bdv/CNAC, Grenoble, by Stéphanie Moisdon & Nicolas Trembley.
- 1999, ZAC 99, Paris Musées & Musée d'art moderne de la Ville de Paris, by Stéphanie Moisdon & Nicolas Trembley.
- 2000, ALBUM : Teaser (Presumed innocent), by Michelle Nicol & Nicolas Trembley, Cologne, BQ, Jörg Bötnagel and Yvonne Quirmbach.
- 2006, Bless Celebrating 10 years of Themelessness-Video Compilation (DVD), edited by BDV, Nicolas Trembley, Geneva, JRP|Editions.
- 2007, CCS Paris-Centre Culturel Suisse- 2003–2005, edited by Michel Ritter, Texts by Thomas Hirschhorn, Martin Jäggi, Philippe Rahm, Hans Rudolf Reust, Michel Ritter, Nicolas Trembley, Les Presses du Réel.
- 2008, Centre Culturel Suisse, 2006, 2007, 2008, by Nicolas Trembley
- 2008, John Armleder: Jacques Garcia, edited by Nicolas Trembley, published by JRP Editions.
- 2012, Sgrafo vs Fat Lava. Edited by Nicolas Trembley, Texts by Ronan Bouroullec, Horst Makus, Nicolas Trembley Geneva: JRP|Editions
- 2013, Mingei: Are You Here, Nicolas Trembley, Pace London.
- 2014, Erik Lindman-Open Hands, by Erik Lindman, Texts by Bob Nickas and Norman Rosenthal, Interview by Nicolas Trembley, Almine Rech Gallery Editions.
- 2015, The Four Seasons Forever by Sam Falls, edited by Nicolas Trembley, published by Flash Art, on the occasion of the Sam Falls' solo show at Franco Noero Gallery in Turin.
- 2018, The Syz Collection, edited by Nicolas Trembley, texts by Clément Dirié, Emmanuel Grandjean, Matthieu Neyroud, Nicolas Trembley, published by JRP Editions.
- 2019, Wade Guyton, edited by Nicolas Trembley, Texts by Tristan Garcia & Nicolas Trembley, Les Presses du Réel.
- 2021, Keramikos: Matthew Lutz-Kinoy & Natsuko Uchino: Keramikos, edited by Nicolas Trembley, Published by Verlag der Buchhandlung Walther König. It was awarded the prize of the most beautiful Swiss Book in 2021.
- 2022, The Ceramics of Wifredo Lam, edited by Krystyna Gmurzynska and Mathias Rastorfer, texts by Nicolas Trembley, Eskil Lam, Dorota Dolega-Ritter, Sophie Makariou, Published in collaboration with Musée national des arts-asiatiques-Guimet and SDO Wifredo Lam.
