= Le Consortium =

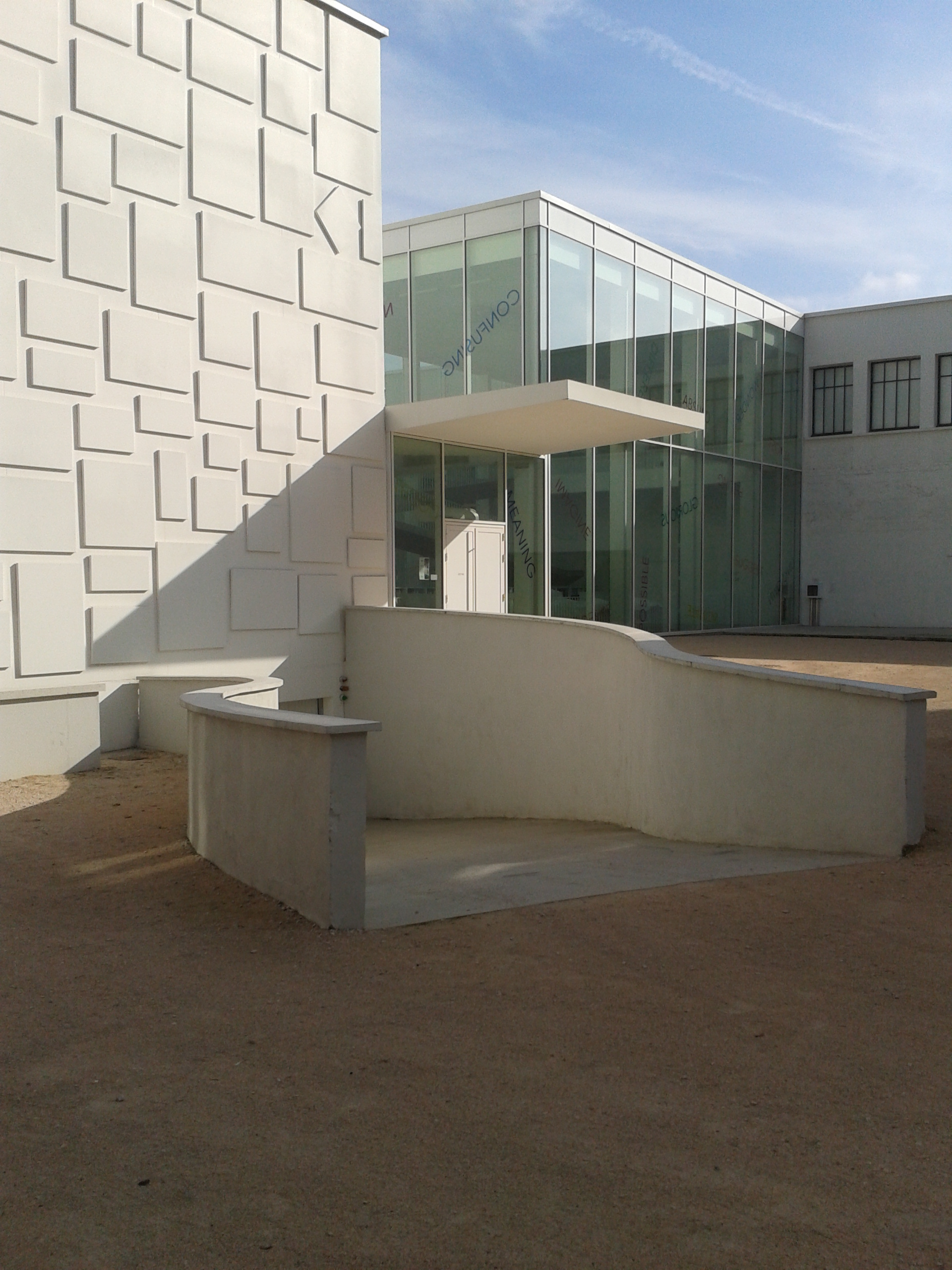
- Established: September 15, 2011
- Location: Dijon (Côte d'Or), France
- Coordinates: 47.31331°N 5.0458°E
- Type: Art museum
- Collection size: More than 300 artworks from a hundred international artists
- Director: Xavier Douroux
- Architects: Shigeru Ban and Jean de Gastines
- Website: leconsortium.fr

Le Consortium is a contemporary art center based in Dijon founded by Xavier Douroux & Franck Gautherot, among others, from the association Le Coin du Miroir (The Corner Mirror). The center was run by Douroux, in collaboration with Gautherot and Eric Troncy. In 1982, The consortium was awarded the Art Center label, and moved to an old 600 m^{2} (6,500 sq ft) appliance store in downtown Dijon and in 1983, Le Coin du Miroir, À La Limite and Déjà Vu joined and became a single entity. In 1991, Le Consortium expanded by moving to a 4,000 m^{2} (43,000 sq ft) factory on the outskirts of Dijon. In 1996, Troncy joined Le Consortium as co-director and in 2000, Kim Seung-duk joined as co-curator and director of international development. In 2009, Le Consortium launched an office on Hoxton Street in London, directed by Sophie Claudel and in 2011, a new building was opened, designed by Shigeru Ban

== Organization ==
=== Contemporary art center ===
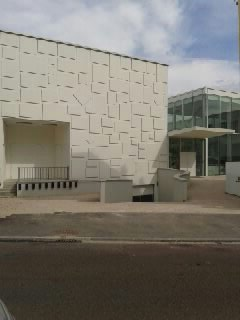
Le consortium de Dijon

The objectives of Le Consortium are the production and exhibition of contemporary works, the enrichment of the public heritage in this area, the promotion, diffusion and training to art and today's thinking. Le Consortium is also in a process of reflection and experimentation in cultural engineering and administration of artistic activities related to performing arts. Le Consortium finds its origin in the mid-70's alternative structures, installed in the heart of the cities, and designed as power balances and independent places. Le Consortium's first actions have been realized with the most protester artists regarding to the language or the way to make art, as Buren, Mosset, Toroni, Rutault, Boltanski, Messager, Le Gac, Baldessari, Luthi... The Contemporary Art Center organizes 8 solo or group exhibitions of international artists each year. It hosted the works of Chris Burden, Rémy Zaugg, Yayoi Kusama, but also the first exhibition in France and even in Europe of today recognized artists as Jorge Pardo, Maurizio Cattelan, Sylvie Fleury, Mark Leckey, Rachel Harrison, Charline von Heyl...

=== The collection ===
The collection includes over 250 works by international artists, primarily acquired during the early stages of their careers. In 1998, these holdings were featured in a dedicated exhibition at the Centre Georges Pompidou in Paris. Artworks from the collection are regularly loaned to various cultural institutions. Within the organization's exhibition spaces, the collection is displayed on a rotational basis, serving as an educational resource that complements temporary exhibitions.

=== Exhibitions ===
==== Selected recent shows ====
- 2013 The Photographic Object 1970; Robert Barry
- 2012 FRAC / CONSORTIUM : 2 Collections
- 2011 «The Deer», a show by Eric Troncy; Sherrie Levine
- 2010 Sylvie Auvray; Lynda Benglis
- 2008 Christian Boltanski, «Questions-réponses»
- 2007 Mark Lecky, «Industrial Light and Magic»
- 2005 Angela Bulloch; Marc-Camille Chaimowicz, «Partial Eclipse 1982-2002»
- 2004 Carsten Höller; Ugo Rondinone, «Short Nights, Long Years»
- 2003 Ann Veronica Janssens; Richard Hamilton, «Editions & Multiples»
- 2002 Lily Van Der Stokker, «Family and Friends»; Lee Bul, «The Monster Show»; Christopher Wool
- 2001 Niki de Saint-Phalle; Dominique Gonzalez-Foerster, «Quelle architecture pour Mars ?»
- 2000 Yayoi Kusama; Wang Du

=== Public Art ===
==== New Patrons programme ====
The Art & Society department is running a programme of public commissions, mainly dealing with the rural area and its historical and cultural heritage. Since 1991, Le Consortium has been mediator of the Fondation de France within the framework of the Nouveaux commanditaires activities in Bourgogne, which give individuals, organizations, and public corporations the opportunity to commission a contemporary artwork. One of the goals of the project is to help local development through tourism. The Art & Society department works in collaboration with the European LEADER programme for rural and cultural development.

==== Public commissions ====
Le Consortium, thanks to its long experience in the domain of contemporary art and to the relationship it built with the most famous artists over the years, is particularly qualified to lead public art projects : from isolated public artworks, in rural or urban areas, to big sets of works acting together in coherence, including projects designed in accordance with the social and cultural context of the territory in which they are implanted. Here below are a few examples of the public commissions recently carried out by Le Consortium.

==== Lille (France) ====
FLOWER POWER » / LILLE 2004, European Capital of Culture

- dates: 6 Dec 2003 – 8 Feb 2004 at Palais Rameau
- dates: 6 Dec 2003 – 22 Jan 2004 at Palais des Beaux-Arts & Musée de l’hospice Comtesse
- Curators: Franck Gautherot, Kim Seung-duk, Xavier Douroux, Eric Troncy & Caroline David.

Within the framework of this big-scale show, occupying several places in Lille as museums and cultural centers, Le Consortium conceived a public art project in collaboration with the internationally recognized Japanese artist Yayoi Kusama: Les Tulipes de Shangri-La.

Between the train station Lille Europe and the city center, the work takes place in a wide empty place, as a 7,50-meter-high bouquet of colored and wild flowers, emerging among the buildings. Visible from a raised walkway, it is also directly reachable on the esplanade, such as natural flowers that belong to nobody, and anybody. This is Kusama's first monumental sculpture out of Japan.

==== Anyang (South Korea) ====
"ANYANG PUBLIC ART PROJECT"

- since 20 October 2007
- Curators: Kim Seung-duk, Franck Gautherot, Sung Won Kim (artistic director & associate curator)

Anyang Public Art Project is an exhibition of public commissions and an art festival held in Anyang, a city located at 25km from Seoul. The objective of this project is to stimulate curiosity, awake the creative spirit of people whose city will be transformed. As a true outdoor laboratory, this project makes temporary and permanent works meet each others. Fifty monumental works of artists from different nationalities are presented in Anyang City: John Armleder, Angela Bulloch, Daniel Buren, Marc Camille Chaimovicz, Eunji Cho, Michael Elmgreen & Ingar Dragset, Rachel Feinstein Sylvie Fleury, Gloria Friedmann, Liam Gillick, Gimhongsok, Dan Graham, Yayoi Kusama, Bertrand Lavier, Olivier Mosset, Mai-Thu Perret, Rirkrit Tiravanija, Gary Webb, Yan Pei Ming...

==== Doha (Qatar) ====
"MSHEIREB DOWNTOWN DOHA PROJECT"

- 2011 - 2014

Le Consortium acted as an art consultant for the MDD Project, which consists in the re-qualification of a whole district in Doha, capital of Qatar. About 20 outdoor artworks will be installed in the city, punctuating the streets or enhancing the surrounds of museums, schools, mosques... Plus, additional 2- or 3-dimensional works (paintings, photographs, sculptures, furniture...) will be installed in the lobbies of buildings, as much in professional and commercial areas as in the residential zones. Deeply linked to the heritage and the culture of Qatar and its people, such a public collection will gather pieces from local and emerging artists, along with works of internationally recognized ones.

==== Gwangju (South Korea) ====
"ASIA CULTURE CENTER"

- since Autumn 2014

Since 2014, Le Consortium takes part into the development of the Asian Culture Center in Gwangju (South Korea), managing the space design, the public art and other related projects like the opening of a culture store.

== Research and development ==
=== Building museums, in and out ===
At the beginning of its activity, Le Consortium was set up in a 30 m2 space, at the first floor of an alternative library in Dijon. The structure early moves to a "gallery-apartment" and in 1982 finally occupies an old store of 600 m2 in the city center. In parallel in 1991, an old factory of 4000 m2 located in the inner suburbs has been included in the spaces of Le Consortium. In 2008, the art center arranges a shop, at the entrance of the exhibition space, for the sale of books and multiples. In 2009, the Consortium opens an office in Hoxton Street, London, in the continuation of its willing to promote and extend its approach of art and the society. Two years later, in 2011, the famous Japanese architect Shigeru Ban conceived the new building of Le Consortium, in accordance with the consideration of what an art center is in its founders’ minds.

As an example, conceptually and architecturally, Le Consortium appears to portray our capacity to invent new forms of spaces and places, and to supervise the construction a museum from alpha to omega, from the building to the programming, including the commercial and promotional matters.

=== Programming ===
The next fundamental step of building a museum consists in the programming. Each art center requires a specific agenda, including the permanent hanging of a collection, temporary exhibitions, events or shows, other arts performances, etc. in accordance with its conceptual and artistic definition.

=== Thematics ===
- Art & thinking
- Diplomatic anniversaries (France, Korea, etc.)
- Cultural events (Lille 2004, etc.)

== The satellites ==
=== Les Presses du Réel ===
In addition to documenting, publishing enables a deepening of the exhibition activities of the Consortium. Les Presses du Réel limited company was set up in 1992, in order to make the publishing business financially independent from the Consortium. Its publications include series about today's most relevant contemporary art, as well as the main historical and literary texts from or about the 20th century's avant-gardes : Monographs (Lily van der Stokker, Yayoi Kusama, Lee Bull, Annette Messager, etc. ), exhibitions catalogues, artists’ writings, previously unpublished documents, classical texts never reprinted, and so forth. The series ‘L’Ecart Absolu’, ‘Document sur l’Art’, ‘Otto Muehl’s’ and ‘Hans Hartung’s', the publications Permanent Food and Charley, define an editorial policy which gives Les Presses du Réel a singular position in the landscape of French and international publishing. To strengthen its independency, Les Presses du Réel has also set up its own Distribution Service, which is used more and more by independent publishers such as the Contemporary Art Center of Geneva, The Fine Arts Museum of Nantes, JRP/Ringier Editions in Zurich...

=== Anna Sanders Films ===
Le Consortium is one of the main shareholders in the production company Anna Sanders Films, which was created by the artists Pierre Huyghe, Philippe Parreno, Charles de Meaux and Dominique Gonzalez-Foester. Their aim is to produce their own films as well as to host other international projects. In the last seven years, several short films and features (Skimkent Hotel, Charles de Meaux’s Le Pont de Trieur, Dominique Gonzalez-Foester’s Riyo and Central Plage...), which were shown in cinemas and broadcast on television, have been produced. Some of them have been brought out on DVD in the Anna Sanders Films MK2 collection. During the 2004 Cannes Film Festival, Apichatpong Weerasethakul’s Tropical Malady obtained the Prix du Jury, and in 2002 Blissfully Yours by the same director obtained the award Un Certain regard.

=== Le Mur Saint-Bon ===
The Mur Saint-Bon is an exhibition space located at 8 rue Saint Bon in Paris. Founded in 2016 by Xavier Douroux and Natacha Carron Vullierme, it allows international artists close to the Consortium to confront their talents, each for 70 days, on one and the same wall. To this day Sarah Morris, Wade Guyton, Alex Israel, Mattias Faldbakken and Rachel Feinstein.

== International recognition ==
- The Turner Prize has been awarded to Mark Leckey in 2008 for his exhibition "Industrial Light & Magic" at Le Consortium.
- The Special Prize of the Jury of the Biennale de Venise 2001 awarded the French Pavilion by Pierre Huyghe, that Le Consortium curated

== Le Consortium: key figures ==
- 1977 date of foundation
- 600 + 4000 m2
- 300 artworks

== Institutional partners ==
- Ministry of Culture and Communication
- DRAC Bourgogne / Regional department for Culture
- Conseil régional de Bourgogne
- Conseil général de la Côte d’Or
- Municipality of Dijon

== See also ==
- Art center
- Dijon
- List of museums in France

== Bibliography ==
- Franck Gautherot, Xavier Douroux, Astrid Gagnard, Fabian Stech and all (2006). Les presses du réel (ed.). Yan Pei-Ming, Execution. Dijon. p. 396. ISBN 2840661616.
