= No Man's Time =

1991 art exhibition in Nice, France

No Man's Time is the title of a 'key' group exhibition of fine art of the early-1990s which has become a 'well-known historical show'. The exhibition was selected by French art critic and curator Eric Troncy with Nicolas Bourriaud and Villa Arson Director Christian Bernard. The exhibits were on display through 6 July to 30 September, 1991 at Villa Arson in Nice, France.

== Artists included in the exhibition ==
- Angela Bulloch
- Sylvie Fleury
- Liam Gillick
- Henry Bond
- Felix Gonzalez-Torres
- Karen Kilimnik
- Aimee Morgana
- Johan Muyle
- Richard Agerbeek
- Rob Pruitt and Jack Early
- Martin Kippenberger
- Philippe Parreno
- Allen Ruppersberg
- Lily van der Stokker
- Jim Shaw
- Pierre Joseph
- Dominique Gonzalez-Foerster
- Xavier Veilhan
