= Kim Seung-duk =

Korean-born French curator and exhibition organizer

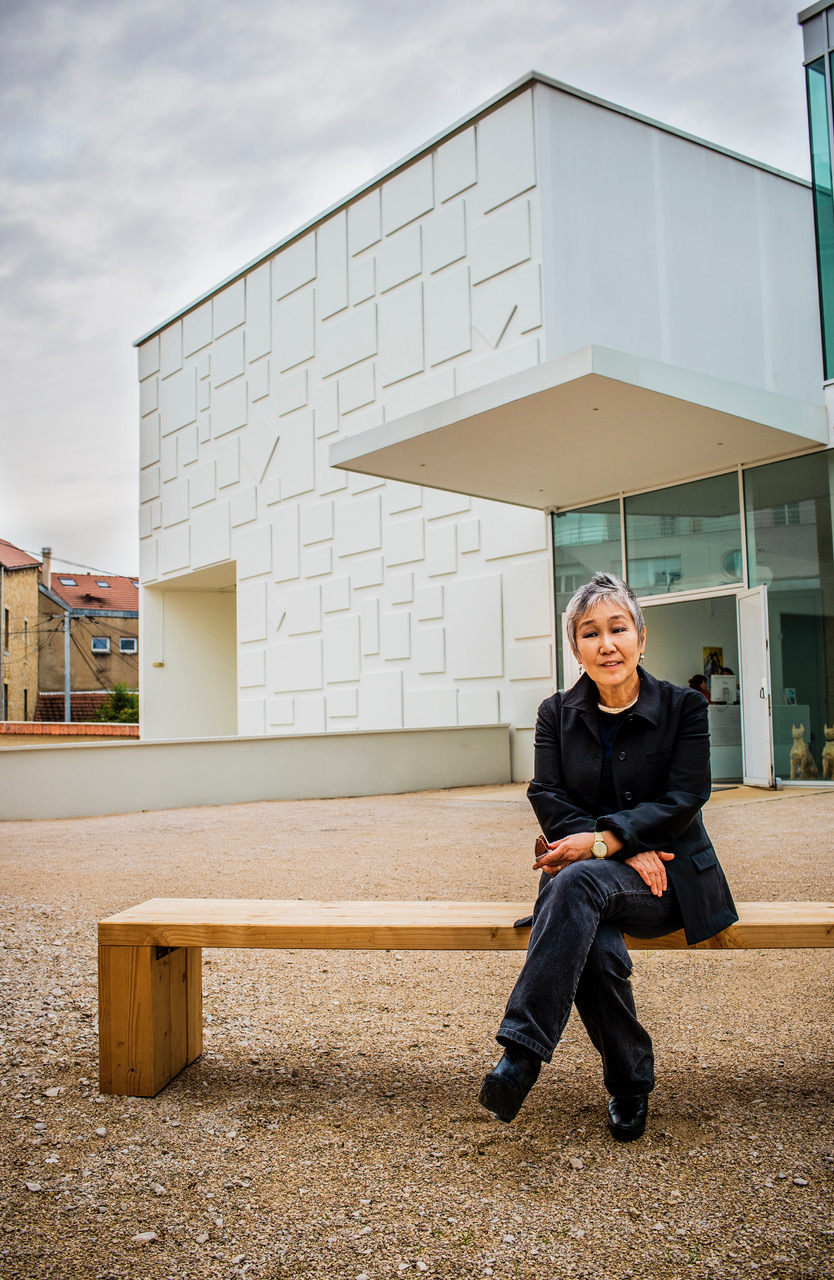
Seungduk Kim, in front of Le Consortium, 2022

Seungduk Kim (born in Seoul, Korea & lives and works in Paris, France) is a curator & exhibition organizer in the field of contemporary art. She is currently working for Le Consortium in Dijon (Burgundy, based in Paris) as co-director and associate curator. Seungduk Kim was selected as Commissioner of the Korean Pavilion for the 55th Venice Biennale in 2013. She was in charge with Franck Gautherot – for Le Consortium – of the artistic direction in Asia Culture Center (ACC in Gwangju, South Korea) in 2014 to 2016, for space design and public art programs. Kim Seung-duk was made Chevalier de l’ordre des Arts et des Lettres by the Ministry of Culture of the Government of France, in July 2022.

== Biography ==
Seungduk Kim left Korea after graduating high school in 1973 and has lived abroad for most of her life.

Educated in New York, she got a M.A. in Art History at Hunter College of New York (May 1990), and a M.A. in French Language & Civilization at New York University (February 1984). She is graduated of Université Paris 1-Panthéon-Sorbonne in art history and archeology, and holder of a D.E.A. in Art History (October 1998).

== Career ==
Between 1993 and 2000, Kim Seung-duk worked for the Samsung Foundation of Art and Culture (now Leeum, Samsung Museum of Art) as a consulting curator based in Venice and Paris. For three years she was also associate curator in the Collection department of the Centre Pompidou (Paris), between 1996 and 1998.

From 2000 till now, Seungduk Kim, as co-director and International Project Director / Development in Asia, collaborated with the late Xavier Douroux (1956-2017), Franck Gautherot, and Eric Troncy along with Anne Pontégnie and Stéphanie Moisdon at the Consortium museum. Le Consortium, founded in 1977, is a contemporary art center based in Dijon, France, which includes a publishing house (Les Presses du Réel), an exhibitions office with an interest in organising shows across genres, and a film production company (Anna Sanders Films).

From October 2011 to 2017, Kim Seung-duk was committee member of programming for the Palais de Tokyo in Paris. She was also project director / art consultant (with Le Consortium) on an overall public art strategy for an urban development in Doha, Qatar from June 2011 to 2014.

From Autumn 2014 to 2016, Kim Seung-duk and Franck Gautherot, one of the original founders of Le Consortium, were in charge of the artistic direction in ACC (Asia Culture Center in Gwangju, South Korea) for space design and public art programs.

In May 2015, on the occasion of the 56th Venice Biennale opening, Kim Seung-duk initiated with Le Consortium, le Silencio and the Palazzo Grassi, "The Venetian Blinds", first of a concert series by visual artists who are also musicians.

In 2016, the workshop ‘Art & Culture master planning’ (October 4–7, in Seoul, Korea) was co-organised by the KAMS (Korea Arts Management Service) under the directing le Consortium, Seungduk Kim & Franck Gautherot.

== Selected exhibitions as curator or co-curator ==
- Jill Mulleady, Blood fog, curated by Franck Gautherot & Seungduk Kim, Le Consortium, Dijon (France), July 7, 2021 - January 9, 2022
- Grancey-le-Château, A World at the Edge, Consortium-Land, Venice Biennale of Architecture (in collaboration with Patrick Berger, Junya Ishigami, Aristide Antona), May 22 - November 21, 2021
- Pattern, Crime & Decoration, curated by Franck Gautherot & Seungduk Kim in collaboration with Lionel Bovier and MAMCO Genève, Le Consortium, Dijon (France), May 16 - October 20, 2019 / MAMCO, Geneve (Swiss), Octobre 10, 2018 - February 3, 2019
- L’Almanach 18, Le Consortium, Dijon (France), June 22 - October 14, 2018
- From Vietnam To Berlin, curated by Seong Won Kim & Seungduk Kim & Franck Gautherot, Asia Culture Center (Gwangju), South Korea, March 9 - July 8, 2018
- Jay Defeo : The Ripple Effect, curated by Franck Gautherot & Seungduk Kim, Le Consortium, February 3 - May 20, 2017. This exhibition traveled to Aspen Museum of Art (Colorado, US), June 29 - October 28, 2018
- L’Almanach 16, Le Consortium, Dijon (France), 2016
- Han Mook & Lee Ungno : Two Korean modernist painters in Paris, Le Consortium, Dijon (France), 2015-2016
- Kimsooja, To Breathe : Bottari, Korean Pavilion, 55th Venice Biennale (Italy), June 1 – November 24, 2013
- Jurgen Teller : Touch me, Daelim Contemporary Art Museum, Seoul (Korea), 2011
- Lynda Benglis, Le Consortium, Dijon (France) and 5 other museums (Van Abbe museum, IMMA, RISD, New Museum, Museum of Contemporary Art, Los Angeles), 2010
- Yayoi Kusama : Mirrored Year, Boijmans Van Beuningen Museum Rotterdam (Netherlands), Museum of Contemporary Art Sydney (Australia), City Gallery Wellington (New Zealand), 2008
- On Kawara : Pure Consciousness, one of a series of ten kindergarten projects, Yonghwa Kindergarten, Yonghwa Temple, Tongyeong (Korea), 2008
- The 2nd Anyang Public Art Project 2007, Anyang (Korea), 2007
- Yayoi Kusama : Dots Obsession ? Love Transformed into Dots, Haus der Kunst Munich, (Germany), 2007
- Elastic Taboos : Within the Korean World of Contemporary Art, Kunsthalle Wien, Vienna (Austria), 2007
- Execution : Exhibition of YanPei-Ming, Saint-Etienne Museum of Modern Art, Saint-Etienne (France), 2006
- Thoughts of a Fish in the Deep Sea, Valencia Biennale, Valencia (Spain), 2005
- Domicile : Prive/public, Saint-Etienne Museum of Modern Art, Saint-Etienne (France), 2005
- Flower Power, Lille 2004 exhibition projects, European Cultural Capital City, Palais des Beaux-Arts de Lille, Palais Rameau, Lille (France), 2004
- Wang Du : Disposable Reality, Rodin Gallery, Seoul (Korea), 2003
- Yayoi Kusama, Le Consortium, Dijon (France), Japanese cultural House in Paris (French: Maison de la culture du Japon à Paris), Paris (France), Kunsthallen Brandts Klaedefabrik, Odense (Denmark), Les Abattoirs, Toulouse (France), Kunsthalle Wien, Vienna (Austria), Art Sunje Seoul & Kyungju (Korea), 2000-2003
- Kim Sooja & Yan Pei Ming : Self-scape, Kunsthalle Brandts Klaedefabrik, Odense (Denmark), 2000-2001
- Asiana : Contemporary Art from the Far East, Palazzo Vendramin Calergi, Venice (Italy), 1995
- Triennale Kleinplastik 1995 : Europa-Ostasien, SudwestLB Forum, Stuttgart (Germany), 1995

== Publications ==
Seungduk Kim has been included in numerous publications, including reviews and essays about international art, architects and designers. She has written a series of articles in the art magazines Art in Culture, Beaux Arts Magazine, Frog Magazine, Art Press, and Quarterly Magazine.
