= Catherine Francblin =

French art curator, art critic and author

Catherine Francblin is a French art critic, art historian, and independent curator.

== Career ==
Francblin joined Art Press magazine in 1975 and was the editor-in-chief until 1992. She then joined the Paris Modern Art Museum where she headed the Educational and Cultural Service until 1998.

From 2002 to 2008, Francblin was in charge of the diffusion of the Centre national des arts plastiques collection. She has curated exhibitions at the Bass Museum (Miami), the Museo de Arte Moderno (Mexico City), the Pinacoteca do Estado (Sao Paulo), among others.

Francblin is the author of a reference work on the New Realists. She has also published several monographs on contemporary artists, including Daniel Buren, Bertrand Lavier, and Niki de Saint Phalle.

== Selected bibliography ==
- Jean Le Gac, Paris : Art Press : Flammarion, 1984.
- Daniel Buren, Paris : Art Press, 1987.
- La Collection Christian Stein : un regard sur l’art italien, Villeurbanne : Le Nouveau musée/Institut : Art édition, 1992.
- Les Nouveaux réalistes, Paris : Ed. du Regard, 1997.
- Bertrand Lavier, Paris : Flammarion, 1999.
- Niki de Saint Phalle. La révolte à l’oeuvre, Paris : Hazan, 2013.
- Deux pères juifs, Lormont, éd. Le Bord de l’eau, 2018.
- Jean Fournier, un galeriste amoureux de la couleur, Paris : Hermann, 2018.
- Bernar Venet : toute une vie pour l'art, Paris, éd. Gallimard, 2022 (Témoins de l'art).
