= Éric Troncy =

French curator and art critic (born 1965)

Éric Troncy (born 1965) is a French curator and art critic who works and lives in Dijon, France, he co-directs the Contemporary Art Museum, Le Consortium, in Dijon, Burgundy. He is co-founder and director of the contemporary art magazine Documents sur l'art (1992–2000) with Nicolas Bourriaud, and of Frog Magazine (2008 - ) with Stephanie Moisdon.

== Life and career ==
Born in Nevers, Troncy studied at the École du Louvre and then on to École des hautes études en sciences sociales.

In 1991 he curated the exhibition No Man's Time a 'key' group exhibition of fine art of the early-1990s which has become a 'well-known historical show'.

Between 1997 and 2003 he curated the trilogy Dramatically Different, Weather Everything and Coollustre, described by Troncy, as an "exposition d'auteur" (as one would say "un film d'auteur"), the exhibition is curated as a succession of scenes in which the actors and landscapes are the works themselves.
The method is the same for all three exhibitions : a precise choice of works from over the last 40 years, some known to the public, others that have only been seen as reproductions, sometimes never at all, is presented in small assemblies, voluntarily narrative.' Presenting itself as a temporary collection, it also addresses questions on hanging and display.

As well as his own magazine, Troncy collaborates regularly with a large selection of high brow publications such as Beaux Arts Magazine, Numéro, Air France Magazine, Les Inrockuptibles, Standard Magazine, l'Officiel Homme.

Journalist on the French radio station France Culture, on the show Tout arrive ! in till 2012, he has since been part of the show La Dispute on the same radio station.

== Curated exhibitions ==
- No Man's Time, Villa Arson, Nice, 1991.
- Dramatically Different, Centre national d'art contemporain Le Magasin, Grenoble, 1997.
- Weather Everything, Musée de Leipzig, Germany, 1998.
- Coollustre. à la Collection Lambert, Avignon, 24 may - 28 September 2003
- Prix Fondation d'entreprise Ricard 2011, titled The Seabass 13 September to 29 October 2011.
- The Deer at Centre d'Art de Dijon 21 December 2011 - 11 March 2012.

== Writings ==
- Le colonel Moutarde dans la bibliothèque avec le chandelier – textes 1985–1998, 1998 Les presses du réel.
- Critique et théorie et Le docteur Olive dans la cuisine avec le revolver – Monographies et entretiens 1989-2002, 2002 Les presses du réel – Critique et théorie. La suite du Colonel Moutarde.
- Coollustre, Les presses du réel – contemporary Art. Published at the occasion of the eponymous exhibition, this illustrated catalogue document three exhibitions of Eric Troncy : Dramatically Different, Centre national d'art contemporain Le Magasin, Grenoble, 1997 ; Weather Everything, Musée de Leipzig, 1998 and Coollustre, Collection Lambert, 2003. The book is illustrated by M/M Paris.
