= Stéphanie Moisdon =

French curator and art critic (born 1967)

Stéphanie Moisdon (born 1967) is a French curator and art critic. She was co-curator of the exhibition Présumés Innocents in Bordeaux, 2000; Manifesta 4 in Frankfurt, 2001; and Before the End at Consortium, Dijon, 2004. She is co-founders with Nicolas Trembley of the BDV (Bureau des vidéos) and the chief editor of Frog magazine.

Moisdon is the Head of the Masters Programme in Fine Art at the École cantonale d'art de Lausanne (ECAL) in Lausanne, Switzerland.

== Work ==
In 2002 her eponymous collection of texts and interviews was published including texts concerning John Armleder, Mehdi Belhaj Kacem, Henry Bond, Guy Debord, Jean-Luc Godard, Dominique Gonzalez-Foerster, Douglas Gordon, Carsten Höller, Michel Houellebecq, Pierre Huyghe, Jacques Lacan, Jean-François Lyotard, Olivier Mosset, Philippe Parreno, and Andy Warhol.

She has promoted French contemporary art internationally, in particular many of those associated with Relational Art.

== Bibliography ==
- Stéphanie Moisdon. Stéphanie Moisdon Dijon: Presses du réel, 2002.
