= Sylvie Fleury =

Swiss artist (born 1961)

- Born: June 24, 1961; Geneva, Switzerland
- Education: Germain School of Photography, 1981
- Known for: Sculpture, installation, video art, photography, mixed media
- Awards: Prix de la Société des arts de Genève, 2015 Prix Meret Oppenheim, 2018 Chevalier de l'ordre des Arts et des Lettres 2020
- Website: sylviefleury.com

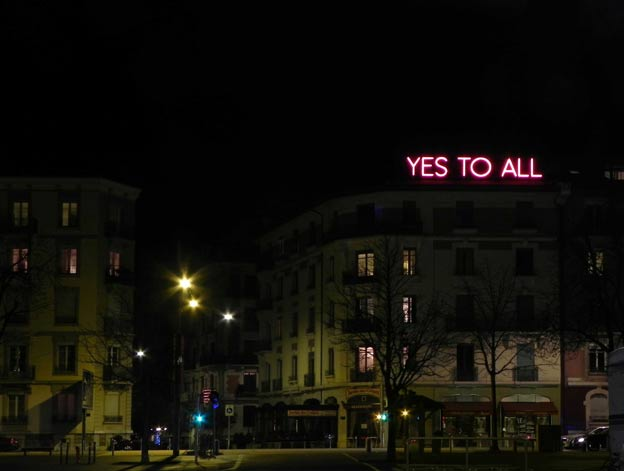
Yes to All, a 2007 installation on a roof in Geneva, Switzerland, as part of the Neon Parallax project.

Sylvie Fleury (born 24 June 1961) is a Swiss contemporary pop artist known for her installations, sculpture, and mixed media. Her work generally depicts objects with sentimental and aesthetic attachments in consumer culture, as well as the paradigm of the new age, with much of her work specifically addressing issues of gendered consumption and the fetishistic relationships to consumer objects and art history.

Fleury lives and works in Geneva.

== Biography ==
Sylvie Fleury was born on June 24, 1961, in Geneva, Switzerland. After her initial schooling, her parents sent her to New York City to work as an au pair. She ended up falling in with a group of NYU students working on short art films. She then went on to study photography at the Germain School of Photography in 1981. While living in New York she worked as an assistant for fashion photographer Richard Avedon for one day.

Fleury then travelled onto India where she encountered learned Bharatanatyam dance, she returned to Geneva and worked for the Red Cross. Under the pseudonym of Silda Brown, she began to collect items marked with a red cross. She converted her apartment into a dentist's cabinet because she was able to acquire a practice facility at a reasonable price. In 1990 she met the Swiss performance artist John Armleder from Geneva and became his assistant. In the same year she and Armleder moved to Villa Magica, a large old town house on the outskirts of Geneva.

In 2004 Fleury and Armleder and his son Stéphane Armleder (1977), founded the Geneva Record Label Villa Magica Records. The label also published CDs and LPs from John Armleder and Sylvie Fleury, from Rockenschaub and John B. Rambo (aka Stéphane Armleder).

== Career ==
Fleury's first show was at Rivolta Gallery in Lausanne in 1990 alongside Olivier Mosett and John Armleder. Through that show she met Eric Troncy and was invited to be a part of his seminal 1991 exhibition No Man's Time at the Villa Arson in Nice, France.

In 1993 Fleury participated in the curated portion of the 45th Venice Biennale. In the roaming section curated by Benjamin Weil, she had 3 models walking throughout Venice wearing reproductions of Yves Saint Laurent's Piet Mondrian dress.

Critics have labeled her work "post-appropriationist", and her books The Art of Survival, First Spaceship on Venus and Other Vehicles, and Parkett #58 (with Jason Rhoades and James Rosenquist), have been featured internationally. In 2015, she won the Prix de la Société des arts de Genève.

Fleury's work is in the collections of the Museum of Modern Art, the Museum der Moderne Salzburg, and the ZKM Center for Art and Media Karlsruhe.

== Publications ==
- Sylvie Fleury – The Art of Survival. Neue Galerie Graz, Graz 1993.
- Sylvie Fleury: Sylvie Fleury. Hatje Cantz, Ostfildern-Ruit 1999, ISBN 978-3-89322-973-4.
- Götz Adriani (Hrsg.): Sylvie Fleury – 49000. Hatje Cantz, Ostfildern-Ruit, 2001.
- Centre of Attraction. 8th Baltic Triennale. Bd. 1, Revolver, Frankfurt am Main 2003, ISBN 978-3-936919-87-5.
- Elke Kania u. a.: The Sublime is Now! Das Erhabene in der zeitgenössischen Kunst. Museum Franz Gertsch, Burgdorf/Schweiz 2006.
- Sylvie Fleury. CAC Málaga, Centro de Arte Contemporáneo de Málaga. Málaga 2011, ISBN 978-84-96159-95-2.
