= Jean Le Gac =

French painter (1936–2025)

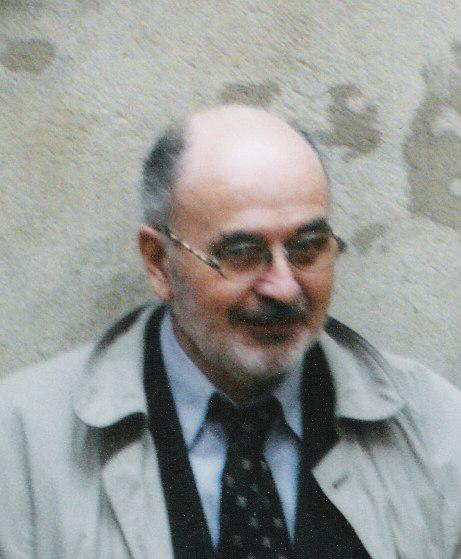
Jean Le Gac, French conceptual artist

Jean Le Gac (6 May 1936 – 26 December 2025) was a French conceptual artist, painter, pastelist and photographer who employed mixed media, frequently video or photography and text to document his investigations and sketched scenes.

== Life and career ==
Jean Le Gac was born in Alès, France on 6 May 1936. His poetic photographic interventions in which he is most often the main subject are accompanied either by typed text describing the underlying story in the artwork or handwritten notes in the art piece itself. Member of the Narrative art movement since the seventies, Le Gac ofttimes tells a story about an imaginary character that viewers can easily identify with the artist himself. He calls it a “metaphor for painting." Le Gac also uses the artist's book as a central part of his art practice. Le Gac is a Professor and lecturer at Institut des hautes études en arts plastiques.

Le Gac was selected to represent France at the Venice Biennale in 1972 and at Documenta 5 in 1972 in Kassel, Germany. Following Jean Le Gac's first solo exhibition at the Museum of Modern Art in 1973 in Oxford, United Kingdom, Jean-Hubert Martin, a leading art historian and curator of international exhibitions organized the first Le Gac exhibition in France at the Centre Pompidou in 1978.

In 1991, France's national state-owned railway company (SNCF) commissioned Le Gac to create work for the stained glass ceiling of the newly renovated train station in the Alsatian town of Colmar in France. Through his glass enclosed paintings, Le Gac drew the adventures of twin sisters who were tied up next to the rails but saved by a painter hero.

In 1992, Le Gac was commissioned by the City of Cannes, France, to realize four multi-media artworks in the old fortress prison of the Fort Royal of Île Sainte-Marguerite, famous for having ‘hosted’ the Masque de Fer (Man in the Iron Mask) incarcerated during the reign of King Louis XIV during the 17th century. Le Gac used aquarelle, pastel, acrylic paint, and video projections to create murals in four different jail cells of the fort. Each painting is associated with a video in which a fixed image of the artist appears and whispers a story of the paintings.

As in many of his other works, the concurrent use of text and image allows Le Gac to draw us into his poetic imagination, transporting the viewers in his inner voyages full of trains, dreams, plants, pastels, and photographs, the traces of real and imaginary wanderings. One typical such early work is “Le Roman d’Aventure” made in 1972, where Le Gac represents himself both as the painter searching for an elusive character he never catches up with and as the narrator behind the camera that documents his desperate search. In those “photo-texts” as Le Gac calls them, he talks about himself in the third person and chases his own elusive dream of becoming a painter.

Le Gac died on 26 December 2025, at the age of 89.

== Selected solo exhibitions ==
- 1973: “Imitations of Jean Le Gac” at the Museum of Modern Art, Oxford, United Kingdom
- 1978: “Le Peintre, Exposition Romancée, Jean Le Gac,” at the Musée National d'Art Moderne – Centre Pompidou
- 1984: “Jean Le Gac : un peintre de rêve" at the Musée d'art Moderne de Paris, France.
- 1992: “Jean Le Gac et les peintres amateurs de Fribourg”, Fri-Art - Centre d'Art Contemporain, Fribourg, Switzerland
- 1994: “Jean Le Gac : días con y sin pintura” Museo Provincial de Valencia, Valencia, Spain
- 2003: Musée du Château Villeneuve, Vence, France
- 2006: Villa Tamaris, La Seyne-sur-Mer, France
- 2007: Jean Le Gac "en dormant, en lisant" à l’arsenal, in Soissons, France
- 2009: “Effraction douce”, Musée des tapisseries, Aix en Provence, France
- 2010: Jean Le Gac dans la collection àcentmètresdumonde, Hôtel Campredon, Maison René Char, L'Isle-sur-la-sorgue, France and at the Pavillon Carré de Baudouin, Paris, France
- 2022: Chateau de Chaumont-sur-Loire, France, retrospective: “Jean Le Gac, la peinture à lire” (“Paintings you can read”).

== Selected group exhibits ==
- Venice Biennale, French selection in 1972
- Documenta in Kassel, Germany, in 1972 (Documenta 5) and in 1977 (Documenta 6).
- Kunstmuseum in Lucerne, Switzerland, in 1972
- Exhibited in New York, NY, at the John Gibson Gallery in 1974, in 1976, and in 1979 and in 1982 at the Hal Bromm gallery.
- “Hermit, Researcher, Social Worker? Changing artists’ self-understanding” exhibition at the Kunstverein Museum, Hamburg, Germany in 1979
- “An International Survey of Recent Painting and Sculpture” at the Museum of Modern Art (MoMA) New York, NY in 1984
- “L’Époque, la Mode, la Morale, la Passion,” group show at the Musée National d'Art Moderne – Centre Pompidou, Paris, France, in 1987.
- “More ore than One Photography: Works since 1980 from the Collection” at the Museum of Modern Art (MoMA) New York, NY in 1992
- “Adding It Up: Print Acquisitions 1970–1995” at the Museum of Modern Art (MoMA) New York, NY in 1995
- What does the jellyfish want?, Museum Ludwig, Cologne, Germany in 2007
- “Don Quijote Group Show,” Centro Federico García Lorca, Granada, Spain in 2017
- “Is this how men live?” The Maeght Foundation Collection in 2018
- La Base, Espacio cultural de La Marina de Valencia, Spain, in 2021
- Musée d'art moderne et contemporain (MAMC) Saint Etienne, France in 2021-2022

== Collections ==
- 25 artworks at Centre Pompidou – Musée National d’Art Moderne, Paris, France
- Artwork at MOMA, New York, NY
- Artwork by Le Gac at the MACBA Museum in Barcelona, Spain
- MAMCO / Musée d´art moderne et contemporain, Geneva, Switzerland
- Musée d’Art Moderne et d’Art Contemporain (MAMAC), Nice, France
- MUMOK / Museum Moderner Kunst Stiftung Ludwig, Vienna, Austria
- Museum Boijmans Van Beuningen, Rotterdam, Netherlands
- Museum of Fine Arts Houston (MFAH), Houston, Texas
- Van Abbemuseum, Eindhoven, Netherlands,

== Public works ==
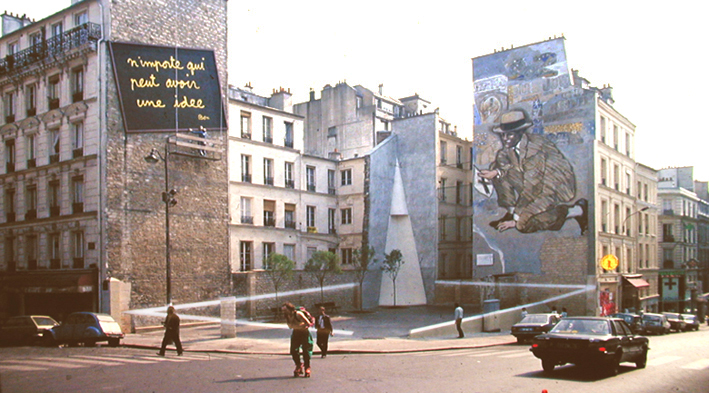
Mural by Le Gac on a 5-story building wall in Paris, that represents a kneeled down detective searching for the painter

- In 1986, Le Gac was commissioned to paint a mural on a 5-story building wall in Paris, at 52 Rue de Belleville, 20th arrondissement, that represents a kneeled down detective searching for the painter.
- In 1991, Le Gac was commissioned by SNCF (National Company of French Railways) to create works on the glass ceiling of a train station in Colmar, France.
- In 1992, Le Gac was commissioned by the City of Cannes, France, to realize four multi-media artworks in the old prison of the Fort of Île Sainte-Marguerite.

== Bibliography ==
- “Imitation of Jean Le Gac” Authors: Jean Le Gac, Translated by Vivien Gordon, Museum of Modern Art, Oxford, England, English language, Publisher: Museum of Modern Art, Oxford, 1973
- “Jean Le Gac : le décor, le roman d'aventures, les vues, le peintre, les images bavardes, les anecdotes” Authors: Jean Le Gac, Muzʼeon Yiśrael, Jerusalem, Israel, language English, Publisher: Musée d'Israël, Jérusalem, Israel, 1974
- “Jean Le Gac par Le Gac Jean” Authors: Ann Hindry, Jean Le Gac, Musée Léon Dierx, French language, published by Cercle d'Art; Musée Léon Dierx : Conseil général de la Réunion; Editions Sainte Opportune, Paris, France, 1992, ISBN 9782702203477
- “La chasse au trésor de Jean Le Gac” (exposition, Musée de Saint Germain en Laye, 24 octobre 2007-5 mai 2008) Authors: Jean Le Gac, Musée d'archéologie nationale France, French, published by Réunion des Musées nationaux, Paris, 2007, ISBN 9782711854257
- “L'atelier de Jean Le Gac” Authors: Jean Le Gac, Evelyne Artaud, French, Publisher: Thalia, Paris, France, 2010, ISBN 9782352780830
- “Jean Le Gac : das Echo und sein Maler” : Ausstellung, Installationen, Filme : 24. Oktober-30. November 1988, Authors: Jean Le Gac (Artist), Günter Metken, Gerhard Fischer, German, Publisher: Daedalus, Wien, Austria, 1988, ISBN 978-3-900911-00-3
- “La machinerie Le Gac” Authors: Jean Le Gac, Kristell Loquet, Jean-Luc Parant, French, Publisher: Le Poney, Illiers-Combray, France, 2008, ISBN 9782916452029
- “Jean Le Gac : le peintre, exposition romancée” : Paris, Musée national d'art moderne, [11 janvier-27 février 1978], Authors: Jean Le Gac, Günter Metken, Musée national d'art moderne (France), French, Publisher: Centre national d'art et de culture Georges Pompidou, Paris, 1978, ISBN 9782858500543
- “Jean Le Gac : der Maler” Authors: Jean Le Gac, Günter Metken, Kunstverein in Hamburg, Städtische Galerie im Lenbachhaus München, Neue Galerie, Aachen, Germany, German, Publisher: Edition Lebeer Hossmann, Brüssel, 1977
- “Jean Le Gac, un peintre de rêve" : ARC Musée d'art moderne de la ville de Paris, 4 juillet-23 septembre 1984, Authors: Jean Le Gac, Suzanne Pagé, Béatrice Parent, Musée d'art moderne de la ville de Paris, French, Publisher: Le Musée, Paris, 1984
- “Jean Le Gac : días con y sin pintura” Authors: Jean Le Gac, Palau dels Scala Valencia, Spain, Spanish, Publisher: Diputación Provincial de Valencia, Valencia, Spain, 1994
- “Jean Le Gac : de schilder van de groet = le peintre des salutations”, Authors: Jean Le Gac, Daan van Speybroeck, Katholieke Universiteit Nijmegen, Print Book, Dutch Publisher: SUN, Nijmegen, 2002, ISBN 9789058750693
- “Jean Le Gac et le photographe”, Authors: Jean Le Gac, Michèle Auer, Venus Khoury-Ghata, French, Publisher: Ides et Calendes, Neuchâtel, 2001, ISBN 9782825801338
- “Et le peintre : tout l'oeuvre roman”, 1968–2003, Author: Jean Le Gac, French, Publisher: Galilée, Paris, France, 2004, ISBN 9782718606316
- “Le Peintre de Tamaris près d'Alès, Recueil de photos et de textes”: 1973–1978, Crisnée, Belgium, French, Published by Yellow Now, 1988, ISBN 9782873400316
- “Introductions aux œuvres d'un artiste dans mon genre”, by Jean Le Gac, Arles, French, published by Actes sud, 1987, ISBN 9782868691583
- “Le peintre intercalaire” by Jean Le Gac, Paris, published by Deyrolle, French, Paris, France, 1990, ISBN 9782908487022
- “Je t'écris, collection, L'art en écrit by Jean Le Gac, French, published by éditions Jannink, Paris, France, 1998, ISBN 978-2-902462-45-2
- “Itinéraires” by Jean Le Gac, French, Published by: Éditions La Pionnière, Paris, France, 2008
- “La Salle des herbiers, musée” by Jean Le Gac, French, Published by: Éditions La Pionnière, Paris, France, 2000
- “Tour of the World” and “The Excursion” by Jean Le Gac, photographic serials published in 1976.
- “Jean Le Gac, l'effraction douce”, by author: Laurent Olivier, French, published by Éditions La Pionnière / Pérégrines, France, 2009, ISBN 9782908092523
- “Jean Le Gac,” by author: Catherine Francblin, French, published by Art Press Flammarion, Paris, France, 1984, ISBN 9782080125026
- “Jean Le Gac, le peintre blessé,” by Dimosthenis Davvetas and Bernard Marcadé, French, published by Éditions Galilée, Paris, France, 1988, ISBN 9782718603438
- “Narrative Art, Qualcosa di / something by Jean Le Gac” by Paolo Tonini, Italian and English languages, published by L’Arengario Studio Bibliografico, Gussago, Italy, 2021
- “Habiter la peinture : expositions, fiction avec Jean Le Gac” by Sandrine Morsillo, Publisher: Editions L'Harmattan, French, Published: December 2004, ISBN 9782747554565
- “Le peintre fantôme =: Der Phantom-Maler” by Jean Le Gac, French, German, Publisher: Stadtgalerie Saarbrücken, Published: December 1992, ISBN 9783893090525
- “Où sont les couleurs ?” by Jean Le Gac, French, Publisher: Seuil Jeunesse, Published: December 2001, ISBN 9782020514392
- Les Couleurs De L'Argent” by Helene Delprat, Aki Kuroda, Jean Le Gac, Sol LeWitt, Ouattara, Jean-Pierre Pinc, Publisher: Edition du Musée de La Poste, French, Published: December 1991, ISBN 9782905412096

== Sources ==
- Larousse, Éditions. "Jean Le Gac - LAROUSSE". www.larousse.fr (in French).
