= Luboš Plný =

Czech painter

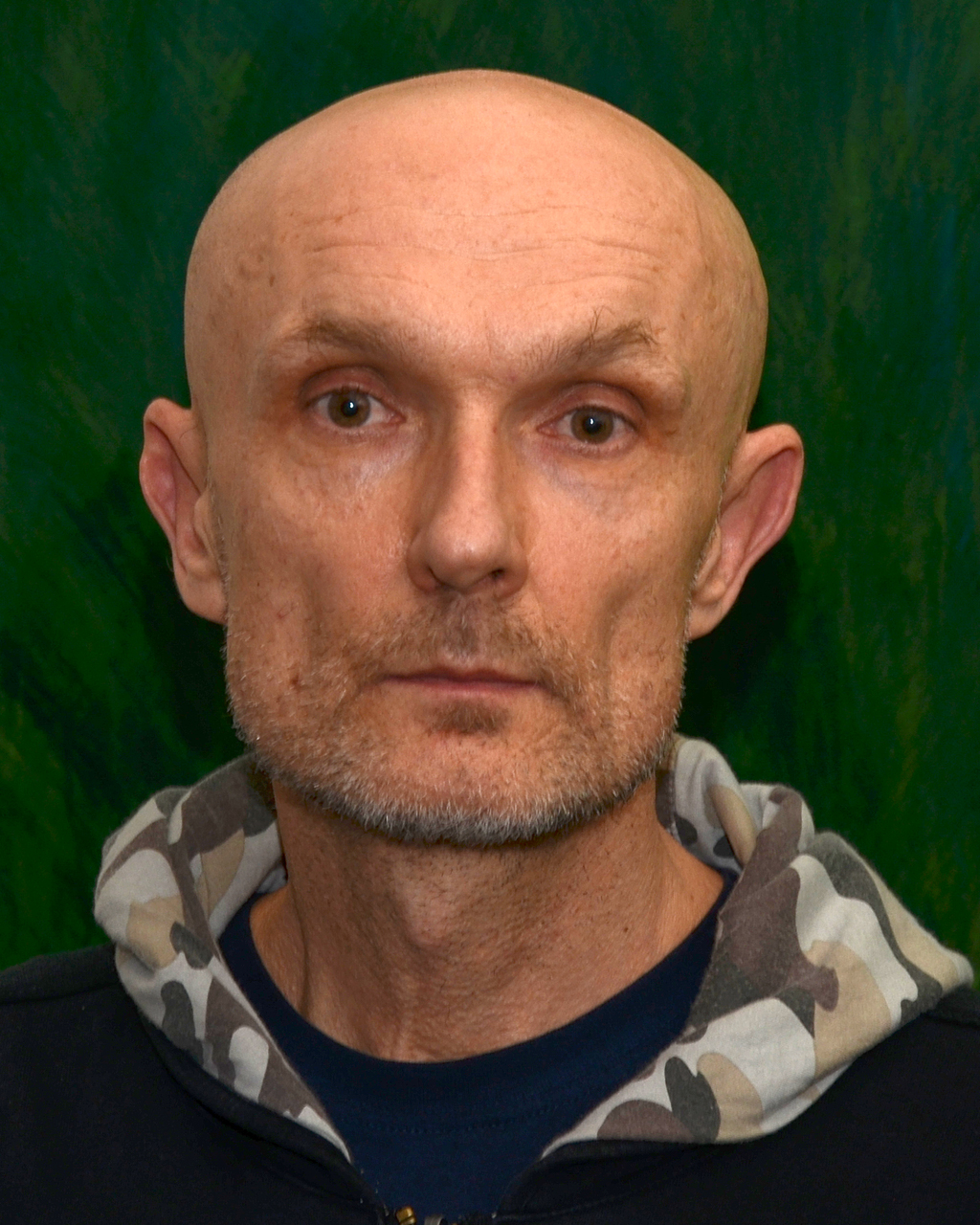
Luboš Plný (2017)

Luboš Plný (born 4 November 1961) is a Czech painter and conceptual artist, usually classified as a creator of art brut. His work can be found in many important collections in the Czech Republic and elsewhere. He is the only Czech artist invited to the 2017 international exhibition Viva Arte Viva! at the 57th Venice Biennale. He lives and works in Prague.

== Life ==
Luboš Plný was born in Česká Lípa (then Czechoslovakia). He was an only child of parents, employed at Czechoslovak Railways. He began making drawings in childhood, and was also interested in anatomy, which he studied by dissecting dead animals. He apprenticed as an electrician at a railway vocational school in Nymburk. In 1983, he did his basic military service, but the stressful environment caused him to suffer from depression, sleep disorders, and hallucinations, and he repeatedly had problems with insubordination. He was subsequently diagnosed with schizophrenia simplex and hospitalized. He spent the next six years working for the Czechoslovak Railways in northern Bohemia. In his free time, he taught painting courses and also trained in bodybuilding and powerlifting. At age 27, he was given a disability pension.

In 1989 Plný moved to Prague, where he spent the next several years holding down various jobs. He painted tin soldiers and was a janitor at a department store, a sales clerk at an antiquarian bookshop, and a security guard at a gallery. In 2004 he even took a gravedigging course. He began to take a deeper interest in the causes of his insomnia, studied medical literature and anatomical guides, and attended autopsies. His drawings from that time were a form of self-therapy.

In the late 1980s, Plný twice applied unsuccessfully to the Academy of Fine Arts in Prague. In 1989, he began to sit as a model for the figure drawing classes with the aim of earning the then-non-existent title of “Academic Model,” which he invented himself and was officially presented with by the school's chancellor, Jiří T. Kotalík, in the year 2000. Plný says, “I realized that I’d rather be the best model than a mediocre artist.” He nevertheless continued to focus on making his own art.

== Work ==
=== Drawings and paintings ===
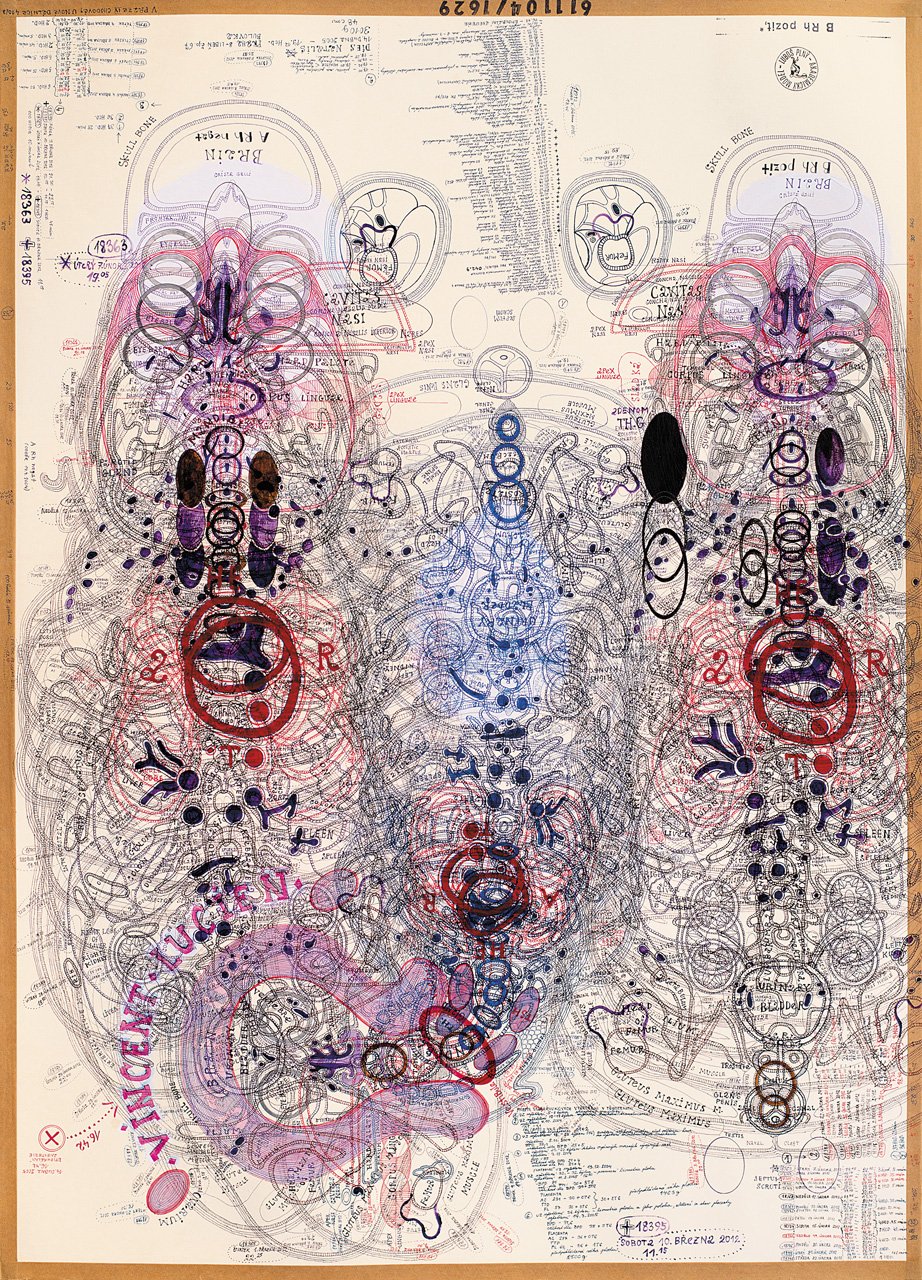
Luboš Plný, Untitled (2012), collection Bruno Decharme

The main theme in Luboš Plný's art is the human body - its functioning, its limitations, and its mortality. Most of his works could be called “anatomical self-portraits”, in which he mixes drawing, painting and conceptual art with scientific project. He combines color ink with acrylic paint and collage, and includes organic elements such as blood, hair, the ashes of his dead parents, used medical aids, and “evidentiary objects” from his experiments on his own body.

Plný depicts the body, usually human but occasionally animal, in horizontal, vertical, and lateral cross-sections as if looking at it using tomography. He often combines various angles of view in the same picture and creates a precise record of each individual layer: skin, musculature, bones, circulatory system, and organs. Some anatomical details, especially the head and sexual organs, are done with extreme precision, while others are merely sketched or left out entirely. The anatomical cross-sections in Plný's pictures are a montage consisting of drawings made on the basis of 19th-century anatomical guides, X-ray images, photographs of Madonnas, models, or items exhibited at the La Specola anatomical museum in Florence, Italy. He takes images from various eras out of their original context and places them into new relationships with their own personal story. Mostly, he focuses on specific events in his life. He understands his anatomical drawings primarily as a “mental space,” as reconstructions of things we know, rather than representations of what can be seen.

One source of inspiration for Plný was the birth of his son Vincent (2005), which he documented in several of his works. Ever since undergoing surgery to remove a part of his thyroid gland, this organ has been blacked out on his drawings. Sometimes he even includes actual photographs from his operation.

An integral part of each of Plný's drawings is a detailed written record that also acts as his diary. Each drawing contains information on his age in days when he started and finished working on it, marked by a star and a cross. He also systematically records other data such as the exact day and time when he took a break from drawing and started again.

=== Conceptual works and performance art ===
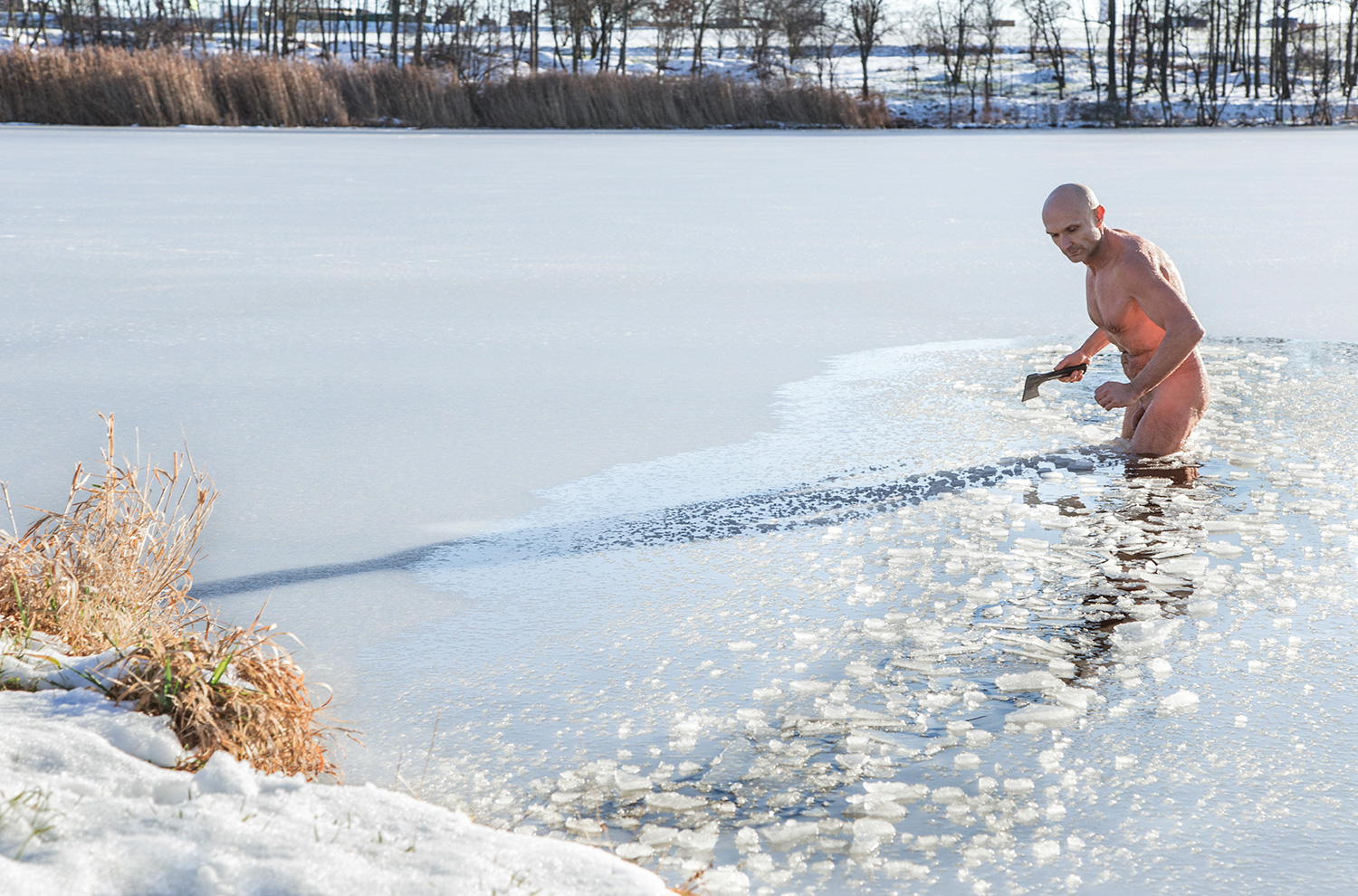
Martin Watch, from the series Unique Individuals, Luboš Plný III, 2017

Luboš Plný's first and the most important project that might be called “conceptual” was the six-year period during which he worked as a model at Prague's Academy of Fine Arts with the goal of obtaining the title of “Academic Model.” During this time, which was the average length of study at the Academy, he perfected his posture, studied art history, and collected a broad range of doctor's assessments, recommendations from leading artists, or photographs showing him in famous poses from the history of art (Myron's Discobolus, Rodin's Thinker, Leonardo da Vinci's John the Baptist, Jacques-Louis David's Death of Marat...). The project even received a grant from the Center for Contemporary Art. In 1999 his request was approved by the school's arts council and the following year chancellor Jiří T. Kotalík officially presented him with the title of “Academic Model” at the graduation ceremony at the Monastery of St. Agnes of Bohemia. Since then he signs his works by a stamp with his title: “Academic Model Luboš Plný.”

Plný carefully documents his life in a diary, in which he records all his daily activities, information on his state of health and meteorological and astronomical phenomena, and into which he also adds clippings, small photographs, and official documents. Many of his works have the character of a scientific experiment. He keeps records of his illnesses, treatments, and bodily processes – for instance fluid intake or output, or the “quality” of his bellybutton lint and its relationship to temperature, the current weather, or type of clothing (Navel Journal). In Father and Mother, he worked with his parents’ ashes sealed in a glass Petri dish, around which he drew a spiral in miniature writing, where he recorded every single day of their lives.

Plný also engages in performance art and long-term projects in which he explores the process of his own aging. Over the course of many years, he has photographed himself in identical positions, and he then combined these photographs in collages to create a new artistic artifacts. His mental and physical suffering, but also physical pleasure, are transformed into art projects through which he tries to understand the limits of his own physical existence. He is not afraid to endure pain, which has a cathartic effect for him. In one series of photographs, he recorded a performance during which he sewed shoe thread around his eyes, mouth, and both forearms without anesthesia.

Luboš Plný also creates three-dimensional assemblages of “erotic aids.”

=== Films and photographic projects ===
- Tobiáš Jirous, Velký vůz (The Big Dipper), 1997
- Vít Olmer, Zajíc v pytli (Rabbit in a Bag), 2001
- Bruno Decharme, Rouge ciel, 2009
- Jaroslav Brabec, Orbis Artis, 2017

Luboš Plný has been photographed by Jaroslav Brabec, Mario Del Curto (who exhibited a series of portraits as part of the Art Brut Live exhibition at the DOX Centre for Contemporary Art in Prague in 2015), Bruno Decharme, Vladimír Štěpanský, František Vaňásek and Martin Watch (as part of the series Unique Individuals). In 2016 this photographic series was among the finalists for the prestigious FEP FETA Award in Amsterdam.

=== Collections (selection) ===
The largest set of works by Luboš Plný is held by the abcd / Bruno Decharme collection in Paris. The Czech-French abcd association also officially represents Plný's work. His creations can be found in many other international collections of art brut and contemporary art, including the Centre Pompidou in Paris.

=== Paintings and photographs ===
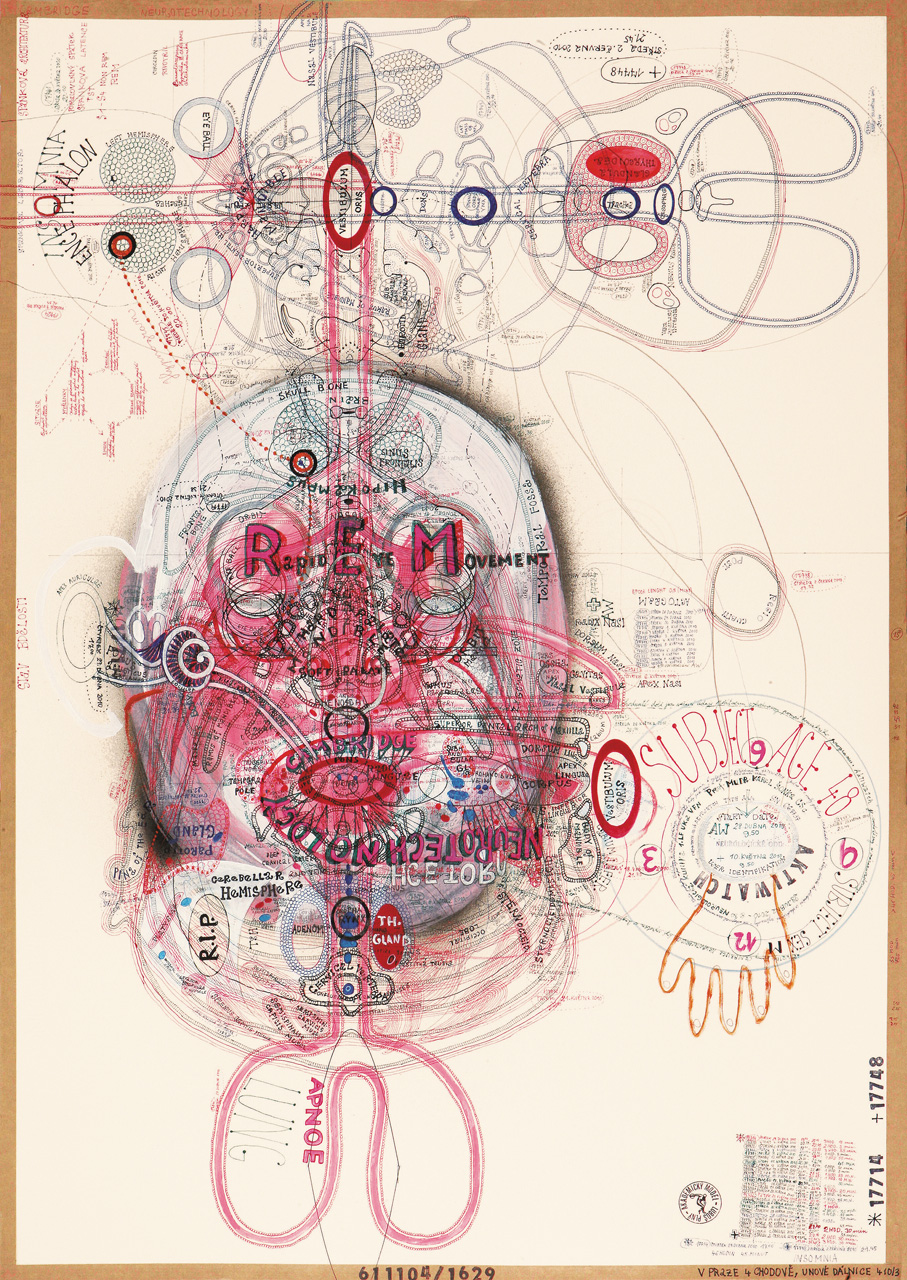
Luboš Plný, Untitled (2010)

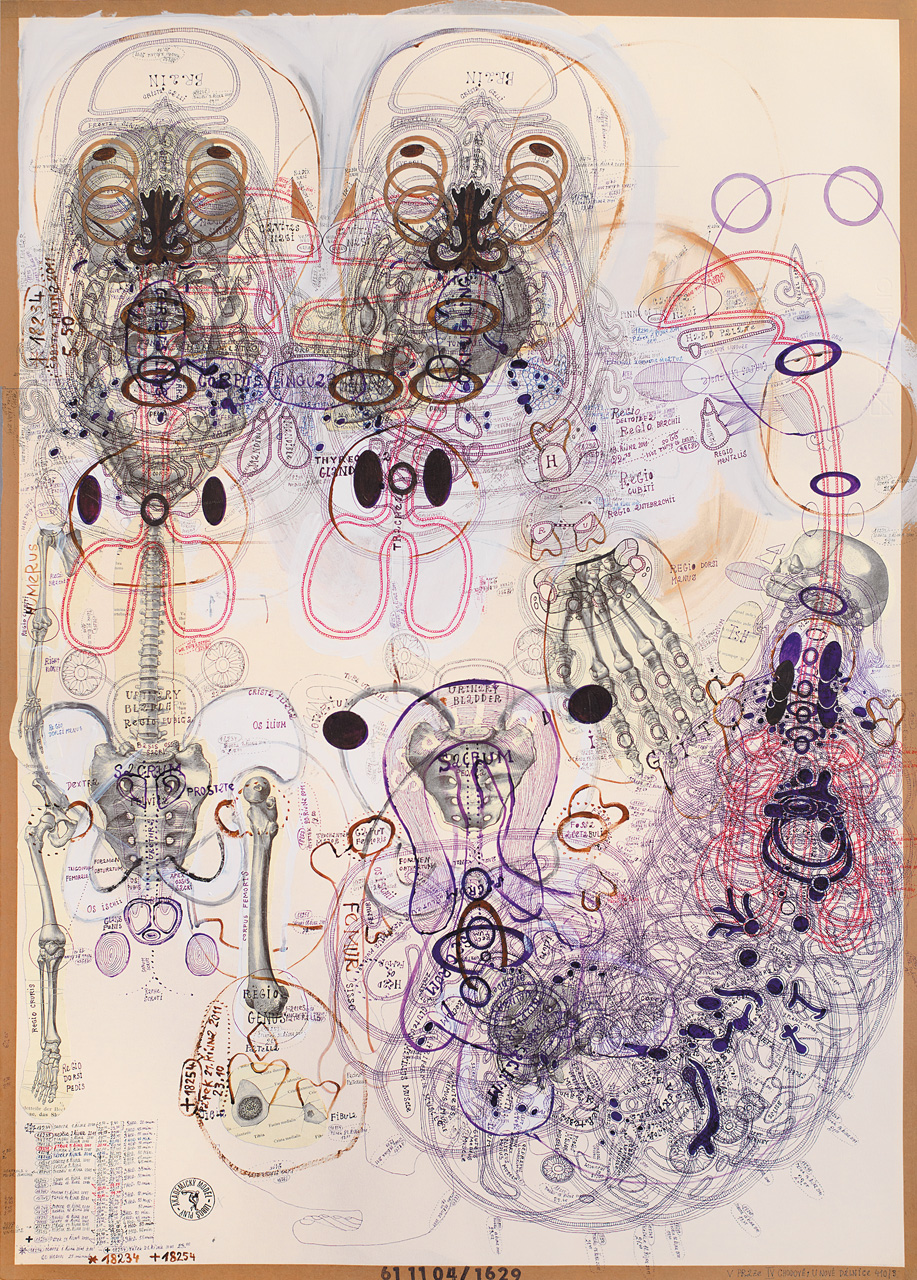
Luboš Plný, Untitled (2011)

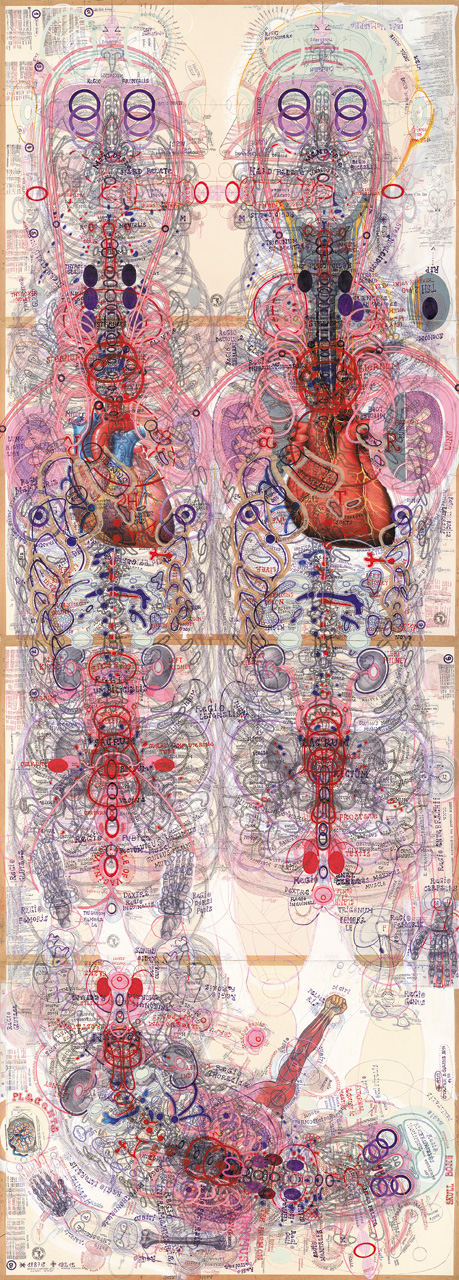
Luboš Plný, Untitled (2014)

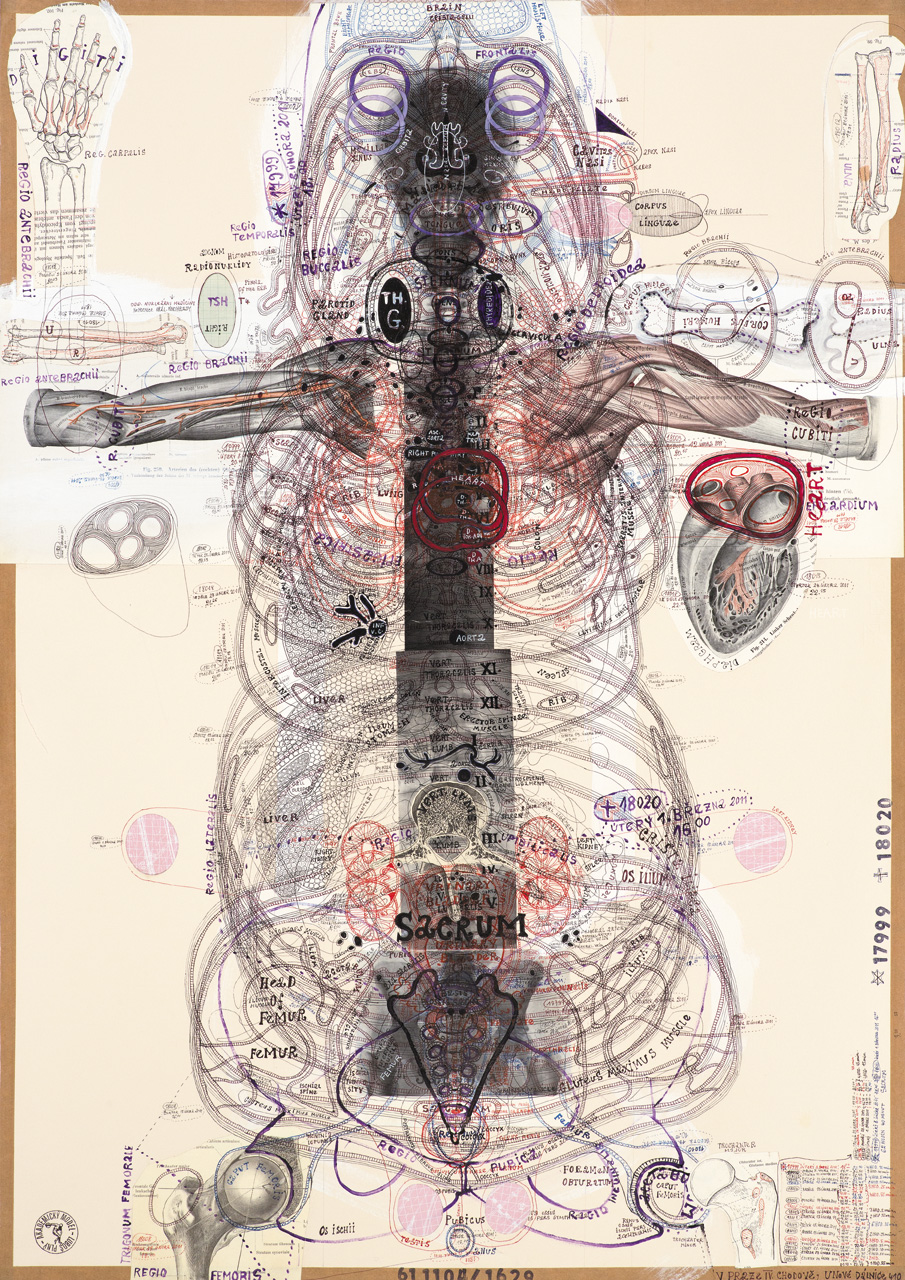
Luboš Plný, Untitled (2014)

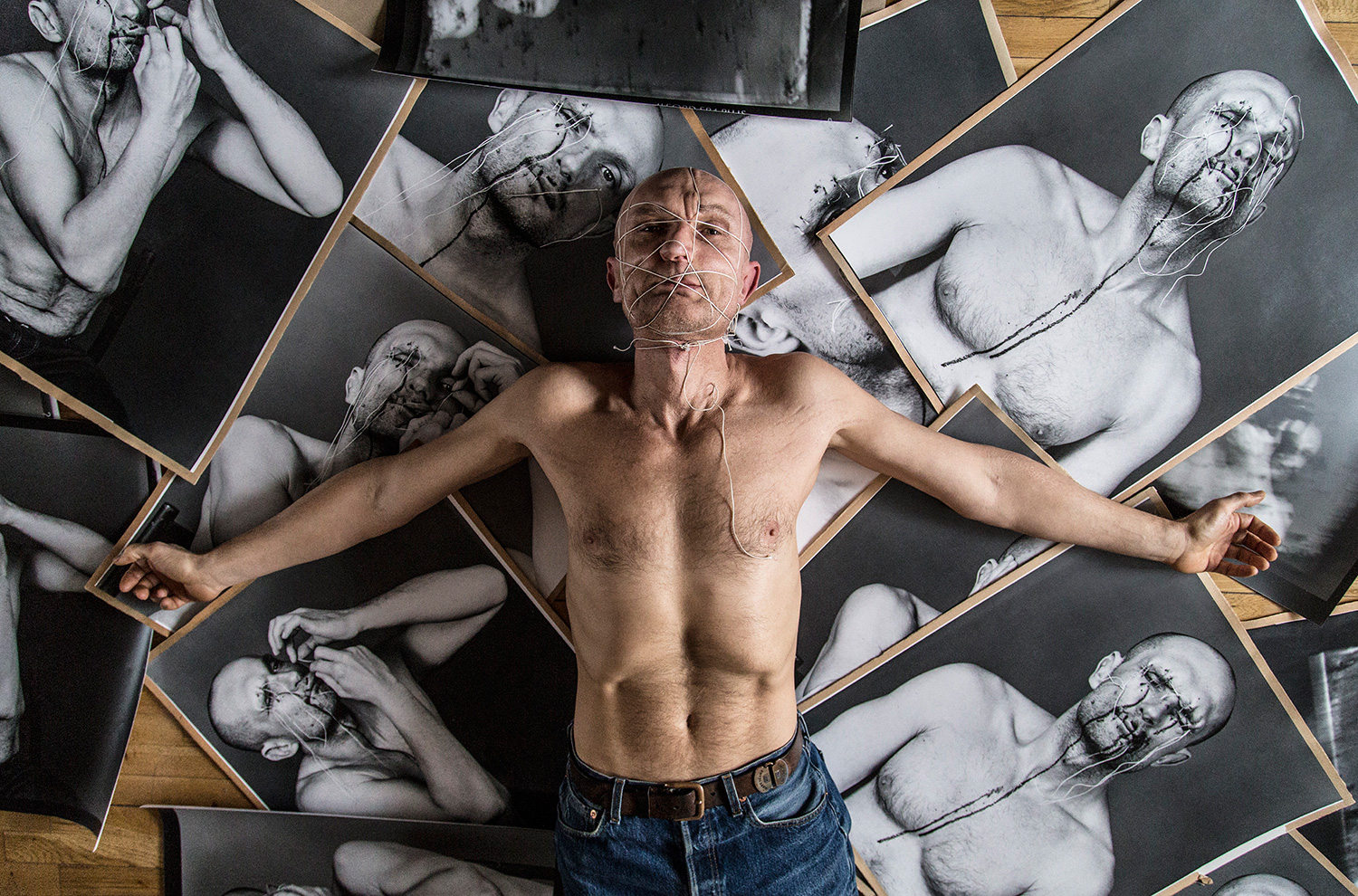
Martin Watch, from the series Unique Individuals, Luboš Plný I, 2017

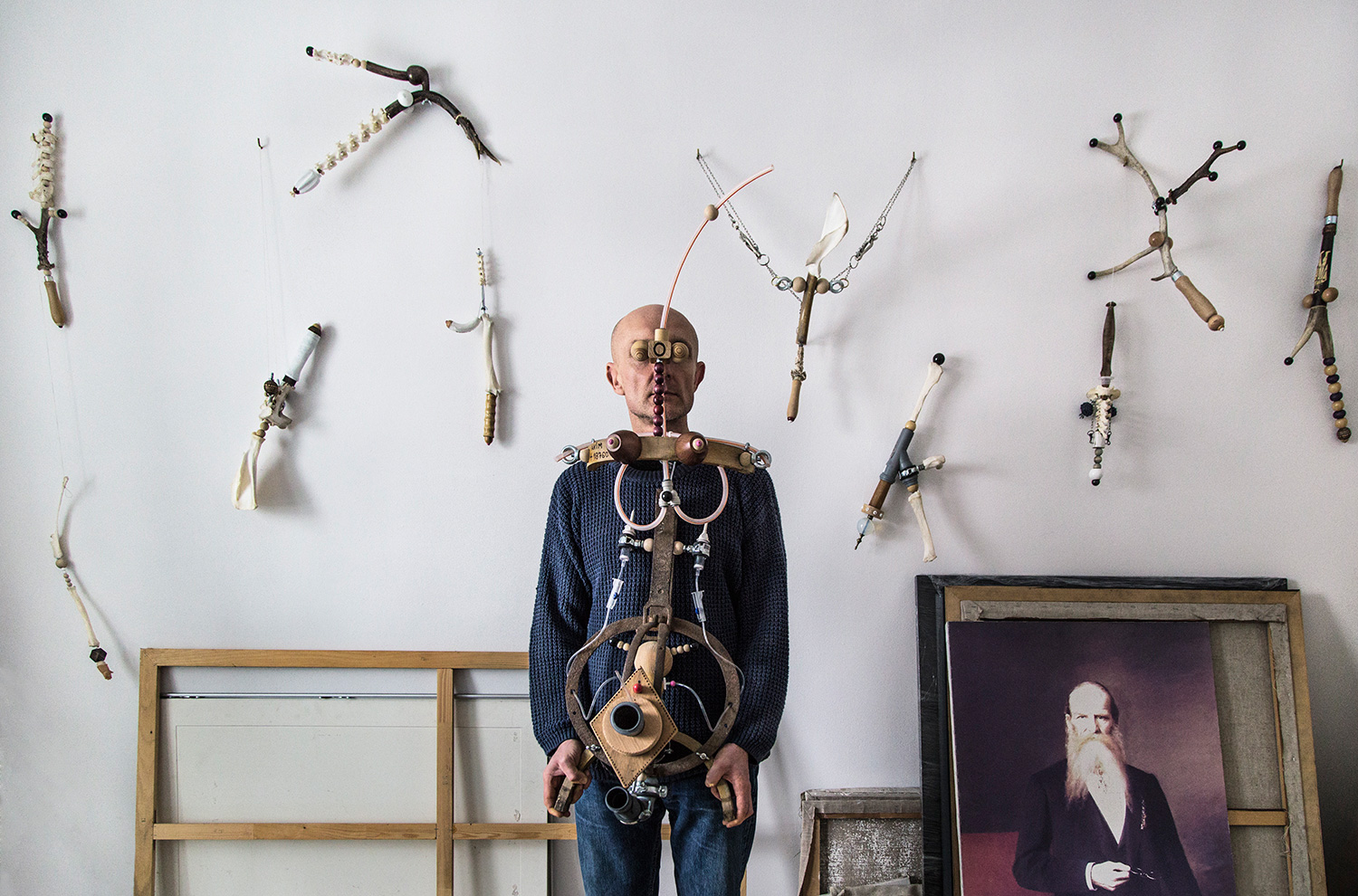
Martin Watch, from the series Unique Individuals, Luboš Plný II, 2017

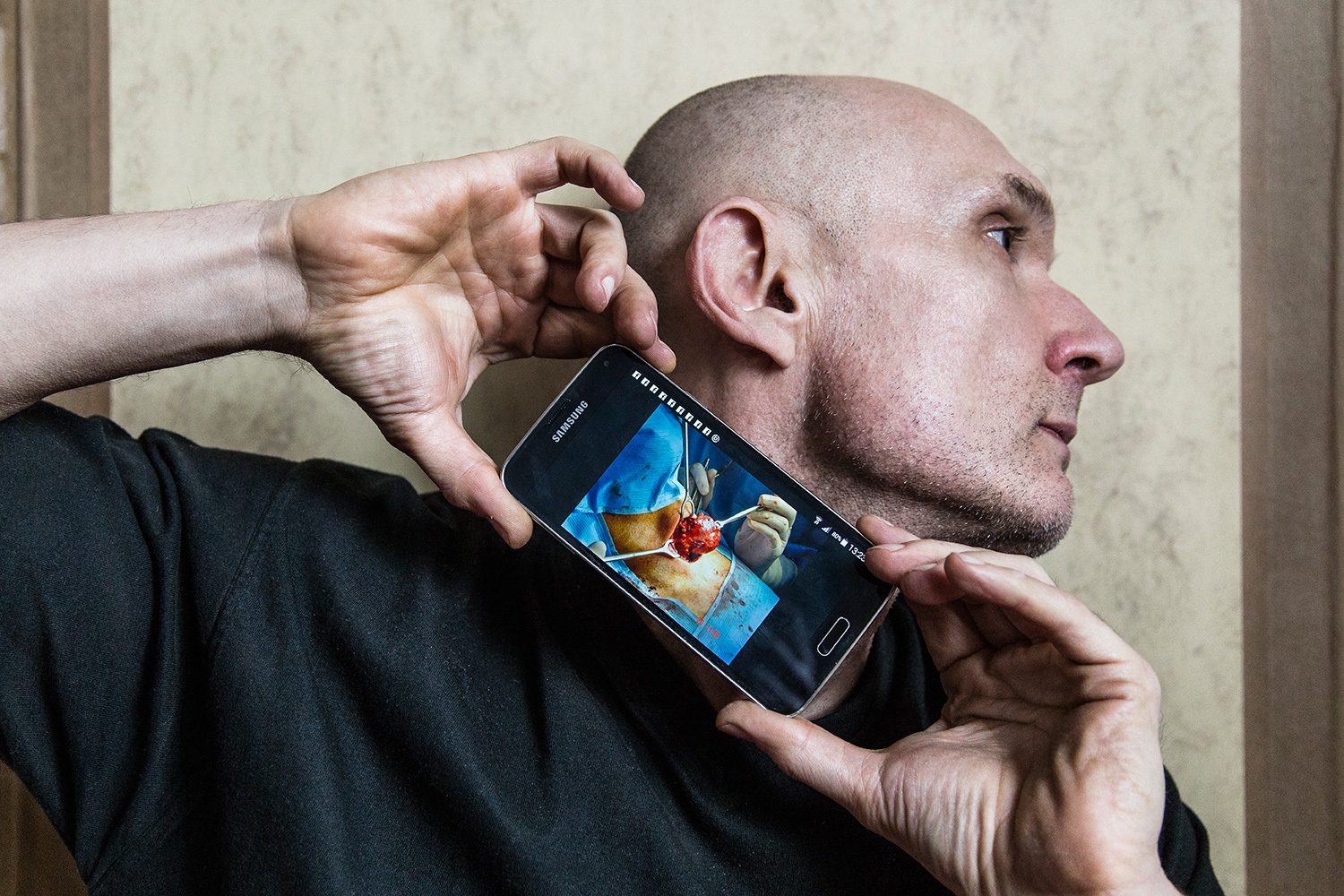
Martin Watch, from the series Unique Individuals, Luboš Plný IV, 2017

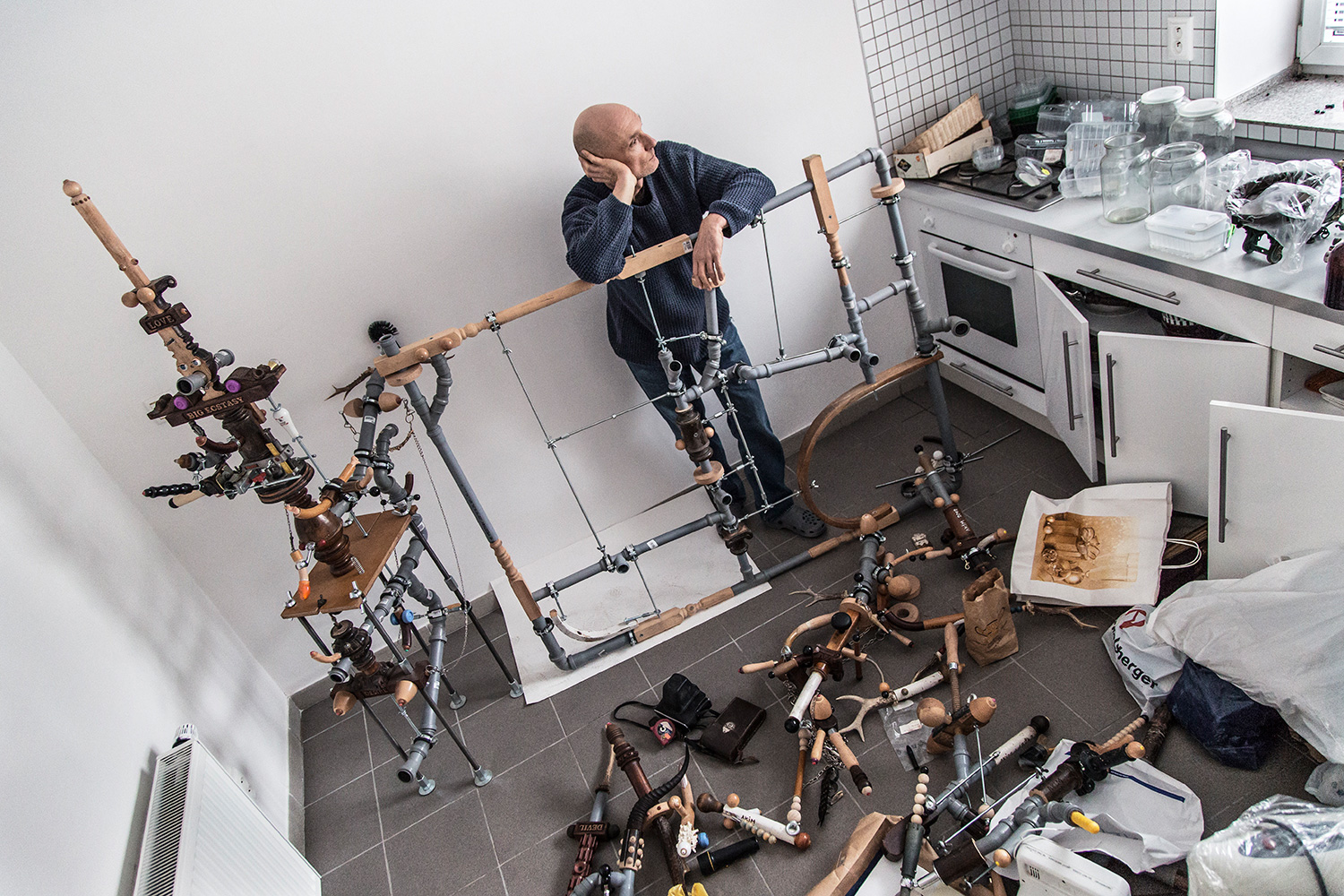
Martin Watch, from the series Unique Individuals, Luboš Plný V, 2017

=== Solo exhibitions ===
- 1988 Pracovní uniformy (Work Uniforms), Česká Lípa Regional Museum
- 1993 Dobře zachované ostatky (Well-Preserved Remains), Galerie Affa, Prague
- 2002 Zuby jsou bezvadný, ale dásně budou muset ven (The teeth are fine, but the gums will have to come out), Galerie Millennium, Prague
- 2003 Luboš Plný, Silvia Vurcfeldová – Chvála bláznovství III (In Praise of Foolishness III), Prague
- 2007 Body Electric, Cavin-Morris Gallery, New York City
- 2009 Anatomia metamorphosis (with Anna Zemánková), abcd la galerie, Montreuil, Francie
- 2010 Anatomia Metamorphosis. Fernand Desmoulin, Dwight Mackintosh & Luboš Plný. Institut Français d’Istanbul, Istanbul
- 2011 Anatomia Metamorphosis (Anna Zemánková / Luboš Plný / František Dymáček), Museum Montanelli, Prague
- 2012 Anatomia Metamorphosis (Anna Zemánková / Luboš Plný / František Dymáček), Saarländische Galerie, Palais am Festungsgraben, Berlin
- 2012 Anatomia Metamorphosis (with Anna Zemánková), Hyogo Prefectural Museum of Art; Hiroshima City Museum of Contemporary Art
- 2014 Timelessness – Zdeněk Košek / Luboš Plný, Galeria Tak, Poznan
- 2017 Luboš Plný: *13677 +20248, Artinbox Gallery, Prague
- 2017 Bodies Electric (with Anna Zemánková), Cavin-Morris Gallery, New York City, NY

=== Group exhibitions (selection) ===
- 2002 Měsíc bláznovství (Month of Foolishness), Galerie Millennium, Prague
- 2003 Das endlose Rätsel. Dalí und die Magier der Mehrdeutigkeit, Museum Kunstpalast, Düsseldorf
- 2003 Trajectoire du rêve, du romantisme au surréalisme, Pavillon des Arts, Paris
- 2003 Triptyque: abcd une collection de l’art brut, Salle Chemellier, Angers
- 2004 A corps perdu: abcd, une collection de l’art brut, Pavillon des Arts, Paris
- 2005 Le chant des sirènes. L’automatisme dans l’art brut, abcd la galerie, Montreuil
- 2005 Měsíc bláznovství (Month of Foolishness), Galerie Millennium, Prague
- 2005 System in Chaos: New Art Brut from the Czech Republic, Cavin-Morris Gallery, New York
- 2006 Monstra a monstra v nás (Monsters and Monsters Within), Galerie Millennium, Prague
- 2006 Art brut. Sbírka abcd (Art Brut. The abcd Collection), Stone Bell House, Prague City Gallery, Prague
- 2007 Hating 4 Never, Cavin-Morris Gallery, New York
- 2007 Umění porodit (The Art of Giving Birth), Artinbox Gallery, Prague
- 2008 Photo Genetics + Sentra Photo Thesis: Star Dust, Cavin-Morris Gallery, New York
- 2008 Chthonic Youth, Cavin-Morris Gallery, New York
- 2010 Plant Body, Animal Body, Cavin-Morris Gallery, New York
- 2010 Le monde à l’envers. Art brut de la collection abcd. Musée Guislain, Ghent
- 2010 Body talk, Musée art et marge, Brusel
- 2011 Láska je slepá – sex je všude (Love is Blind – Sex is Elsewhere), Artinbox Gallery, Prague
- 2012 Discoveries and Recent Acquisitions, Christian Berst art brut, Paris
- 2012 Rentrée hors-les-normes, Christian Berst art brut, Paris
- 2012 Anatomia Metamorphosis: Luboš Plný and Anna Zemánkova: Works from the abcd Collection, MOCA Hiroshima
- 2013 Drawing Now, Galerie Christian Berst, Paris
- 2013 Restless II – A Mix, Cavin-Morris Gallery, New York, NY
- 2013 Kdo lže, krade...? (He Who Lies, Steals…?), Artinbox Gallery, Prague
- 2013 Metro Show, Cavin-Morris Gallery, New York, NY
- 2014 Le mur, oeuvres de la collection Antoine de Galbert, La Maison rouge, Paris
- 2014 Art brut, collection abcd / Bruno Decharme, La Maison rouge, Paris
- 2014 Art Brut – Masterpieces and Discoveries, Christian Berst art brut, Paris
- 2014 Freshet: Old Loves, New Directions, Cavin-Morris Gallery, New York
- 2015 Art brut live: abcd collection / Bruno Decharme, DOX, Prague
- 2015 Rhizome: New Grow That, Cavin-Morris Gallery, New York
- 2015 In Dreams Begin Responsibilities: 30 Years at Cavin-Morris Gallery, Cavin-Morris Gallery, New York
- 2015 dRAW, Intuit, The Center for Intuitive and Outsider Art, Chicago
- 2015 preTENse, Christian Berst art brut, Paris
- 2015 Du nombril au cosmos / Autour de la collection abcd/ Bruno Decharme. art)&(marges, Brussels
- 2016 Maverick, Cavin-Morris Gallery, New York
- 2016 Art Brut: Breaking the Boundaries, Treger-Saint Silvestre Collection. Olivia Creative Factory, São João da Madeira
- 2017 Art Brut: A Story of Individual Mythologies. Works from the Treger-Saint Silvestre Collection, Oliva Creative Factory, São João da Madeira
- 2017 Brut now: l’art brut au temps des technologies, Musées de Belfort, Belfort
- 2017 Viva Arte Viva!, international exhibition at the 57th Venice Biennale

== Bibliography ==
- Various authors, Das endlose Rätsel. Dalí und die Magier der Mehrdeutigkeit, Ostfildern – Ruit: Hatje Cantz Verlag 2003.
- Gille, V. – Decharme, B., (eds.), A corps perdu. abcd, une collection d’art brut. Paris: Paris musées 2004.
- Decharme, B. (ed.), Journal n°1: Le Chant des Sirènes, l’automatisme dans l’art brut, Paris: abcd 2005.
- Cornevin, E. – Dvořák, V., Monstra a monstra v nás / Monsters and Monsters Within, Prague: Galerie Millennium 2005.
- Decharme, B. – Safarova, B. – Zemánková, T. (eds.), abcd, sbírka art brut. Prague: abcd 2006.
- Rovderová, N., Umění porodit. Prague: Artinbox Gallery / Hnutí za aktivní mateřství 2007.
- Safarova, B. (ed.), Masterpieces of abcd collection, Shiga: Museum of Modern Art 2008.
- Zemánková, T., Art brut v kulturologické perspektivě, dissertation, Charles University, Faculty of Arts, Department of Cultural Theory, Prague 2009.
- Decharme, B. (ed.), Journal n°4 : Anatomia Metamorphosis, Luboš Plný & Anna Zemánková. Paris: abcd 2009.
- Zemánková, T. – Safarova, B., Art brut: Anatomia Metamorphosis. Luboš Plný, Prague: Museum Montanelli 2011. ISBN 978-80-254-9588-9
- Safarova, B. – Zemánková, T. (eds.): Anatomia Metamorphosis: Luboš Plný & Anna Zemánková: Works from abcd Collection. Tokyo: Gendaikikakushitsu Publishers 2012.
- Jeřábková, K., Obrazy duše. Tvorba psychotiků v Čechách ve 20. Století. Bachelor's thesis. Faculty of Arts, Masaryk University, Brno, 2013.
- Rovderová, N., Kdo lže, krade...?, Prague: Artinbox Gallery / KANT 2013.
- Decharme, B. – Safarova, B. (eds.), Collection abcd / Bruno Decharme, Paris: abcd – Flammarion 2014.
- Safarova, B., ed.: art brut – collection abcd / Bruno Decharme, Lyon: Fage éditions / Paris: La maison rouge 2014.
- Szaefer, M.: Timelessness – Zdeněk Košek / Luboš Plný. Galeria Tak, Poznan 2014.
- Fraitová, V., Art brut – případová studie, thesis paper, Prague: Prague College of Psychosocial Studies 2014.
- Del Curto, M. – Zemánková, T. (eds.), Art Brut Live: Mario del Curto – fotografie, Prague: abcd / Bern: Till Schaap Edition 2015. ISBN 978-80-905168-5-4
- Decharme, B. – Safarova, B. – Zemánková, T. (eds.) Art Brut Live: The abcd Collection / Bruno Decharme, Prague: abcd 2015.

=== Articles in the media ===
- Zemánková, T. art projekt / Luboš Plný. Art & Antiques, May 2003.
- Safarova, B., Anatomy Lesson, Raw Vision no. 87, 2014.
- Janíčková, A., Český art brut na uměleckém veletrhu v New Yorku, Kulturní noviny, 2015.
- Konrád, D. Na Benátském bienále bude vystavovat Luboš Plný, jeho umění vychází z anatomie i duševních stavů. Hospodářské noviny, 7 Feb. 2017.
- Philipe Dagen, A Venise, la Biennale prend l’art au sérieux, Le Monde, 11 May 2017.
- Alexxa Gotthardt, Scott Indrisek, 14 Artists You'll Be Talking about Long after the Venice Biennale: Luboš Plný, Artsy Editorial MAY 12TH, 2017
- Konrád, D., Luboš Plný ještě nedávno stál modelem, teď jako jediný Čech vystavuje na slavném Benátském bienále, Hospodářské noviny, 21 May 2017.
