= Anna Zemánková =

Czech painter (1908–1986)

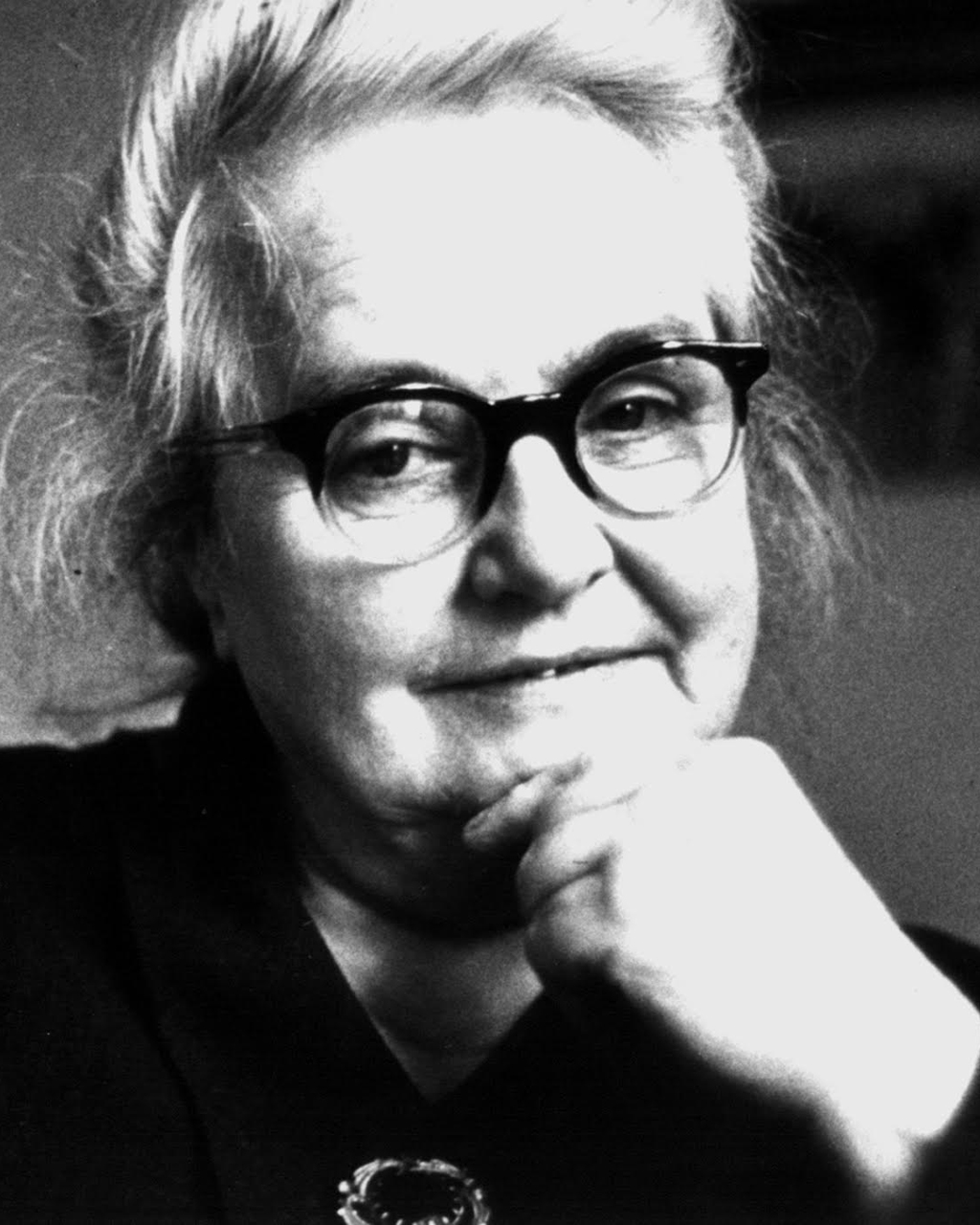
- Anna Zemánková
- Born: 23 August 1908; Olomouc, Margraviate of Moravia, Austria-Hungary
- Died: 15 January 1986 (aged 77); Mníšek pod Brdy, Czechoslovakia
- Education: dentist, self-made painter

Anna Zemánková (23 August 1908 – 15 January 1986) was a Czech painter. She was one of the world's most important artists of art brut. However, her high artistic culture, the diversity of her work, and her clear inner vision make her a departure from the original definition of art brut, and she figures in this category as a solitaire. Eighteen of Zemánková’s works were included in the seminal 2013 Venice Biennale. Her works were exhibited in New York, Paris, and on solo exhibitions in Lausanne and Prague. She is represented in the world's most important art brut collections and auctioned at Christie's.

== Biography ==
Zemánková was born in Hodolany (today part of Olomouc, Moravia) in 1908 to Antonín Veselý, a barber, and his wife Adolfina. She was one of four children.

Zemánková trained as a dentist, and after practicing for three years, she opened her own clinic in Olomouc. She was able to use her earnings to finance the construction of her own family home. In her spare time she was a landscape painter.

In 1933, she married Bohumír Zemánek (1904–1969), a lieutenant of the intendantura (rear security of the army), with whom she had three sons, Bohumír (1935), Slavomír (1936) and Bohumil (1942). After the birth of Slavomir, Anna Zemánek decided to devote herself to her children and household and gave up her artistic work. From 1939 the family lived in Brno, where Bohumír Zemánek was a clerk at the pricing office. After the birth of her third son Bohumil, she had several more unsuccessful pregnancies. In 1948 the family adopted a daughter Anna and moved to Prague, where Bohumír Zemánek was called to the General Staff of the Czechoslovak Army. After joining the army, his son Slavomír was transferred to the Technical auxiliary battalion and Bohumír Zemánek was suspended and reassigned to a food warehouse. He died in a traffic accident in 1969.

Anna Zemánková played the dominant role of the "Great Mother" in the family. She led her children strictly, but realized herself in making toys and clothes, decorating their rooms and inventing fairy tales. As the children grew older and this role began to fade, she experienced a personal crisis, which manifested itself in mood swings and emotional instability. In 1960, her sons discovered their mother's early paintings and convinced her to return to art. This "auto-art therapy" helped her find a new meaning in life and soon became a compulsive passion for her.

Friends of her children, including photographers Jan Reich and Jaroslav Krejčí and FAMU student Vlastimil Venclík, came to the Zemáneks' apartment in Dejvice to admire her drawings. As early as 1964, she presented her work in the first of the "Days of Open Doors". Her work came to the attention of Jean Dubuffet who included several of her pieces in the Collection de l’Art Brut Lausanne, the world’s most notable collection of Outsider Art. Olga Havlová also learned about Anna and brought the art historian Jiří Vykoukal to see the remarkable draughtswoman. He arranged her first exhibition in the foyer of the Na zábradlí Theatre in 1966. In the same year, Arsén Pohribný included her paintings in a travelling exhibition of naïve art. In 1968 he also selected her for an exhibition at the Brno House of Arts and in 1971 for an international naïve art exhibition in Prato, Italy. In 1969 she became one of two characters in the documentary film Man and Woman by Vlastimil Venclík.

In 1979, Anna Zemánková was represented at the Outsiders exhibition at the Hayward Gallery in London, which was the beginning of her international fame. In the 1980s, her diabetes worsened and she gradually had to undergo the amputation of both legs. After her convalescence she lived in a home for the elderly in Mníšek pod Brdy from 1983. She worked as an artist until her death in 1986.

After her death, interest in her work continued to rise steeply. The Cavin-Morris Gallery in New York has organized around 40 exhibitions of her work since 1993, and in 2011 the New Museum in New York presented her in the exhibition Ostalgia. In 2013 she was included in the international exhibition of the 55th Venice Biennale. In the Czech Republic, she has had retrospective exhibitions at the Gallery of Fine Arts in Cheb, the Moravian Gallery in Brno, the Olomouc Museum of Art (1998), and the Prague City Gallery (1998). Her drawings were exhibited at the International Triennial INSITA (Slovak National Gallery in Bratislava) and are on permanent display at the Collection de l'Art Brut in Lausanne and at the exhibition of naïve art at the North Bohemian Gallery of Fine Arts in Litoměřice.

=== Family ===
- Son Bohumír (1935–1939)
- Son Slavomír (1936–2013)
- Son Bohumil (1942–1996)
- Daughter Anna

== Work ==
Anna Zemánková had no formal art training and is therefore considered a classic representative of Art Brut. Her work looks like an herbarium of fantastic alien plants or unknown underwater flora and fauna. The technical skill and precision that she developed as a dentist also played an important role in her work. Her drawings are not reflections of concrete nature, but rather artistic metaphors and "messengers of other worlds and projections of other levels of knowledge." Zemánková is an architect of new nature and a designer of new shapes that give the impression that they are not meant to be merely viewed, but are made to be read or deciphered. At the age of fifty-two, she started creating "swirling, luminous drawings" which evolved into a "repertoire of abstracted floral and insectlike forms set against flat, softly atmospheric backgrounds. The strange rhythm contained in the drawings is influenced by music as its supporting and unifying structure. Zemánková herself once said "I grow flowers that grow nowhere else", but her work is so surreal and disturbing precisely because in the debauchery of shapes and colours the original motif loses its meaning and something elusive emerges.

For Anna Zemánková, creating was a fundamental life activity, thanks to which she could prolong her symbolic fertility and become again and again the creator of new existences, "which were more beautiful than nature had ever created." In a documentary film made about her in 1969 by Vlastimil Venclík, she appears as a woman of exalted expression and dramatic gestures, who does not doubt her privileged status as an artist or the uniqueness of her talent.

After a brief period in which she experimented with format, technique or colour, her work became a daily ritual before 1960. She drew while listening to classical music, often in a state between a dream and a pre-dawn wakefulness. She used mostly A1 and A2 quarters (but eventually also smaller to completely miniature formats) on which, while still in a subdued state of consciousness, she laid out the overall composition, which she later filled in with ornamental details. She started with a pencil sketch, which she painted over with tempera paints or pastel. She worked with professional painting equipment and used a range of coloured valers, sometimes adding reflective colours to enhance the details. After 1963, she used mostly dry pastel, which she "softened" with cooking oil and supplemented with ink or ink pen drawing. Later, she traced details in pencil and microfix, emphasizing them by perforation and embossing. Anna Zemánková was constantly experimenting with new materials and trying different methods: paper and textile collage, crochet applications, pasting beads and sequins... The techniques she had previously used in decorating her home and clothes became an integral part of her work.

Her initial aim for faithful depiction of floral motifs was soon replaced by an interest in abstraction which evolved into completely original abstract forms and free improvisation. Often these are hybrids of plant and animal forms in vibrant colours.

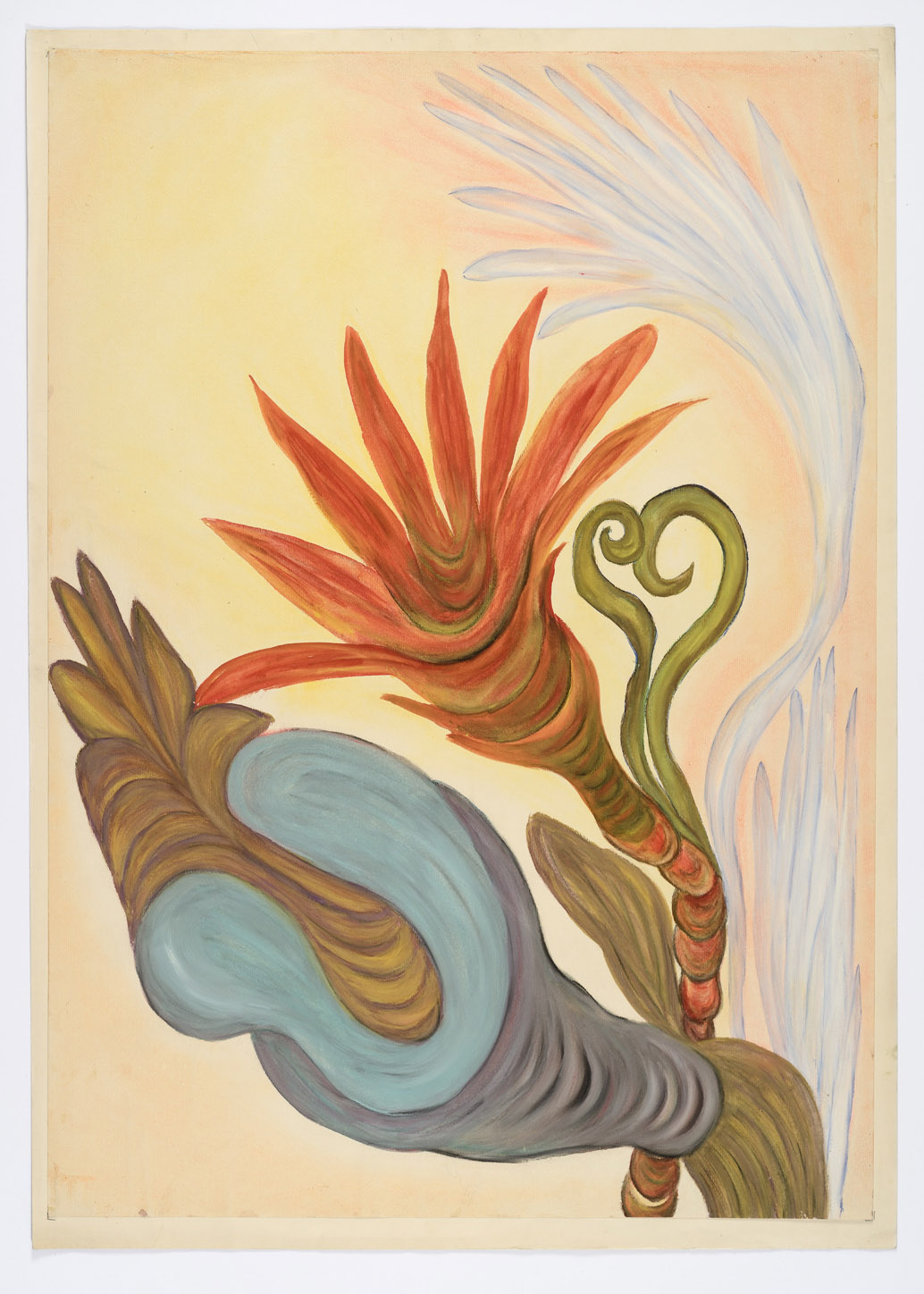
Untitled, tempera and pastel, 1960s

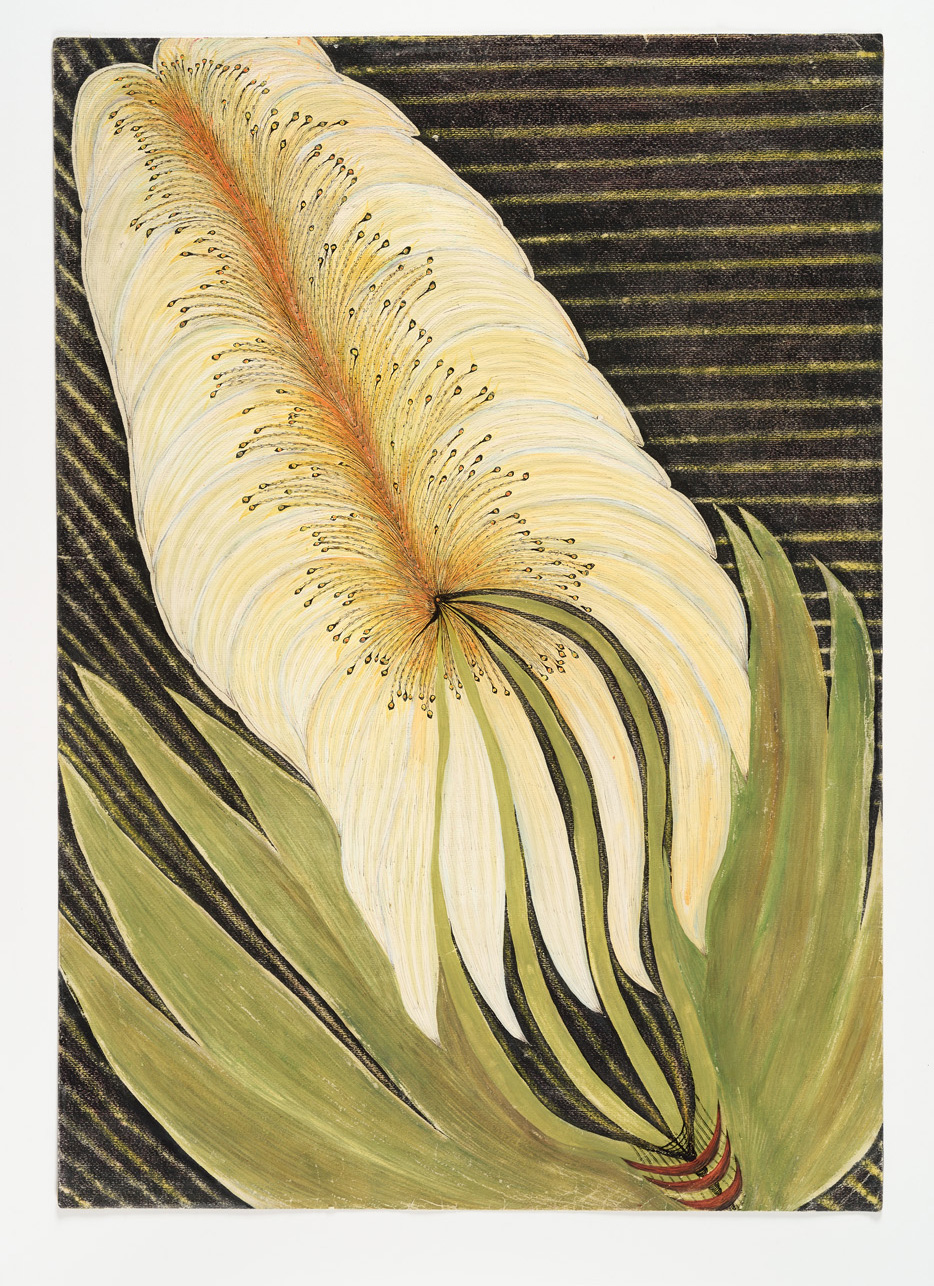
Endless Flower, tempera, pastel and ink, 1960s

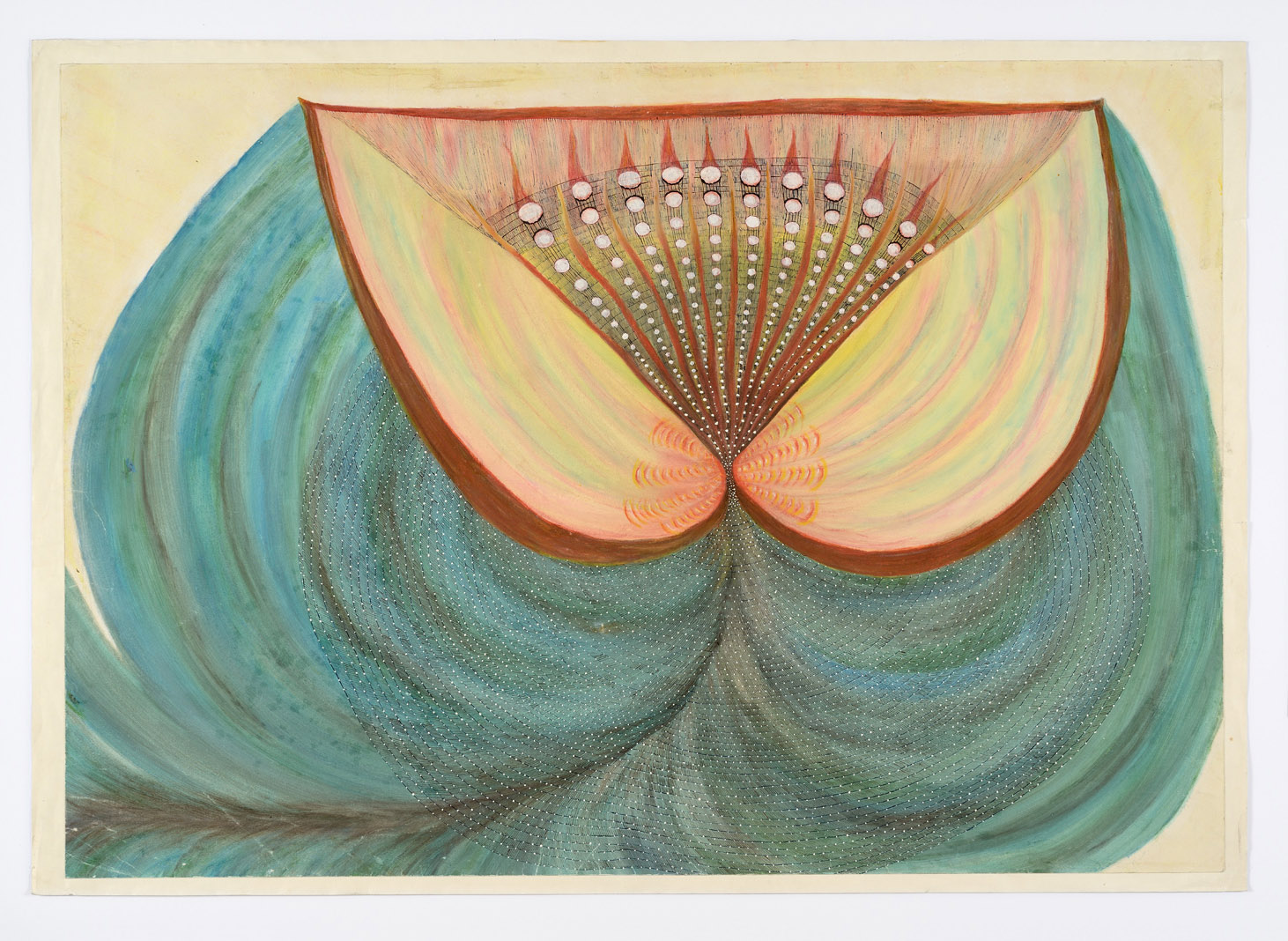
Electric Flower, tempera, pastel and ink, 1960s

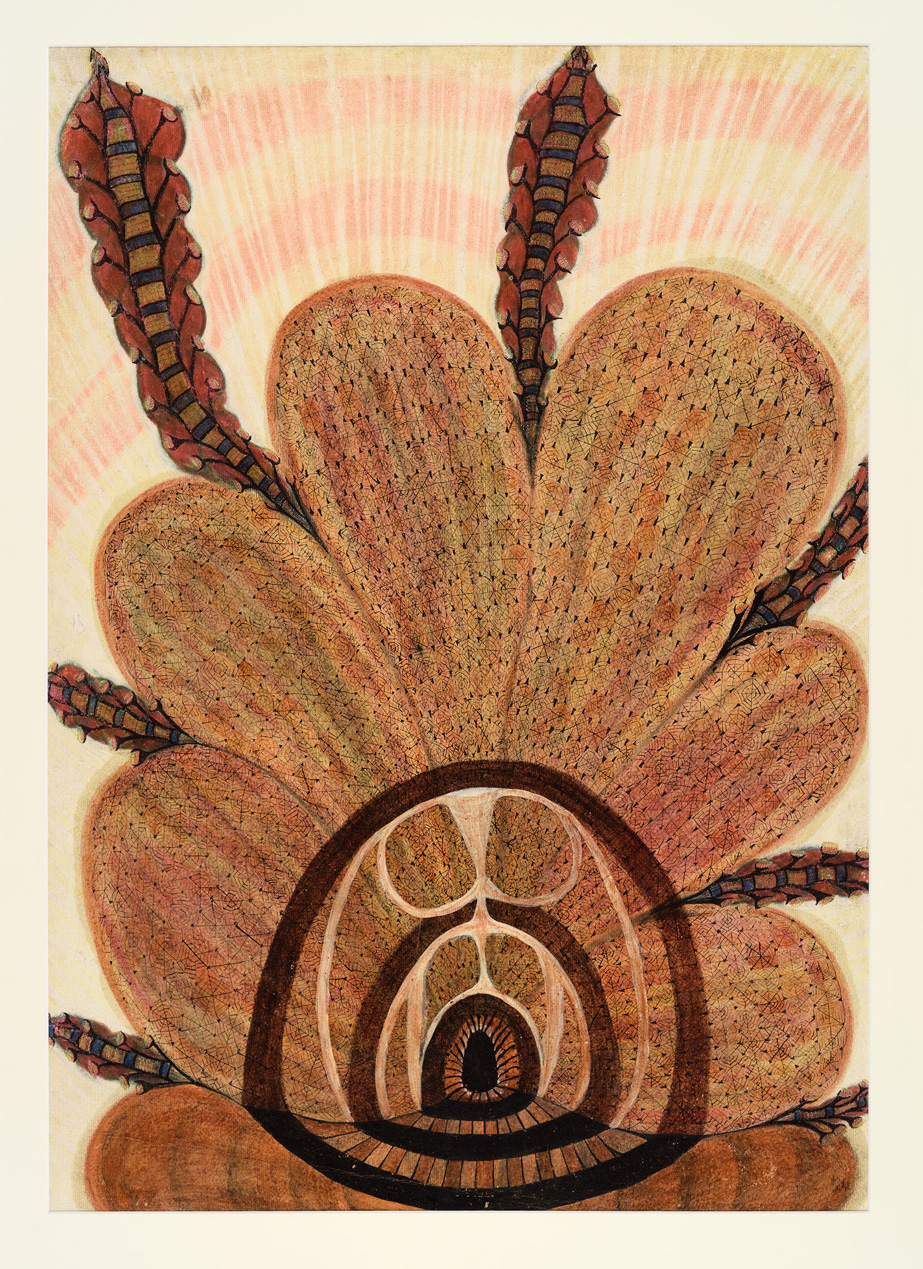
Untitled, pastel, kitchen oil and ink, 1960s

The initial dramatic period of her work is characterized by the composition of two or more disparate forms. Dominant and masculine flowers are in an aggressive position against their feminine counterparts, cloudy hues contrasting with bright pastel colours. Thus, they are a personification of the artist's personal mythology and a means of catharsis of her inner conflicts. Typical is the serial repetition of motifs, which are multiplied to the finest detail in microstructures, simulating the impression of growth or trembling. Through the diagonal composition and the perspective reduction of the central motif, the painter brings a radical dynamism to the painting. Zemánková avidly read science fiction literature about extraterrestrial civilizations. The fantastic creatures or rocket-like formations in her drawings may have their origins in this naive fascination with the mystery of the universe.

After 1963, the rhythm of her paintings calmed down and compact shapes that recall underwater fauna became predominant. Her imagery was dominated by the water element – fleshy shapes flourish and float through space as if in a state of weightlessness. The artist herself referred to her work as a love experience and her repressed erotic energy manifested itself in the form of womb-like formations or in the form of intersections of plump and phallic shapes. The process in which the artist's consciousness turned inward and the distinction between the external and the internal lost its meaning can be described as "physical introspection." Motherhood, which played a key role in Anna Zemánek's emotional life, is reflected in her work in paintings that bear the word Birth or Nativity in their title. In them, organic shapes are combined with intangible bursts of light that recall the haloes of religious images or the transpersonal visions of spiritist mediums.

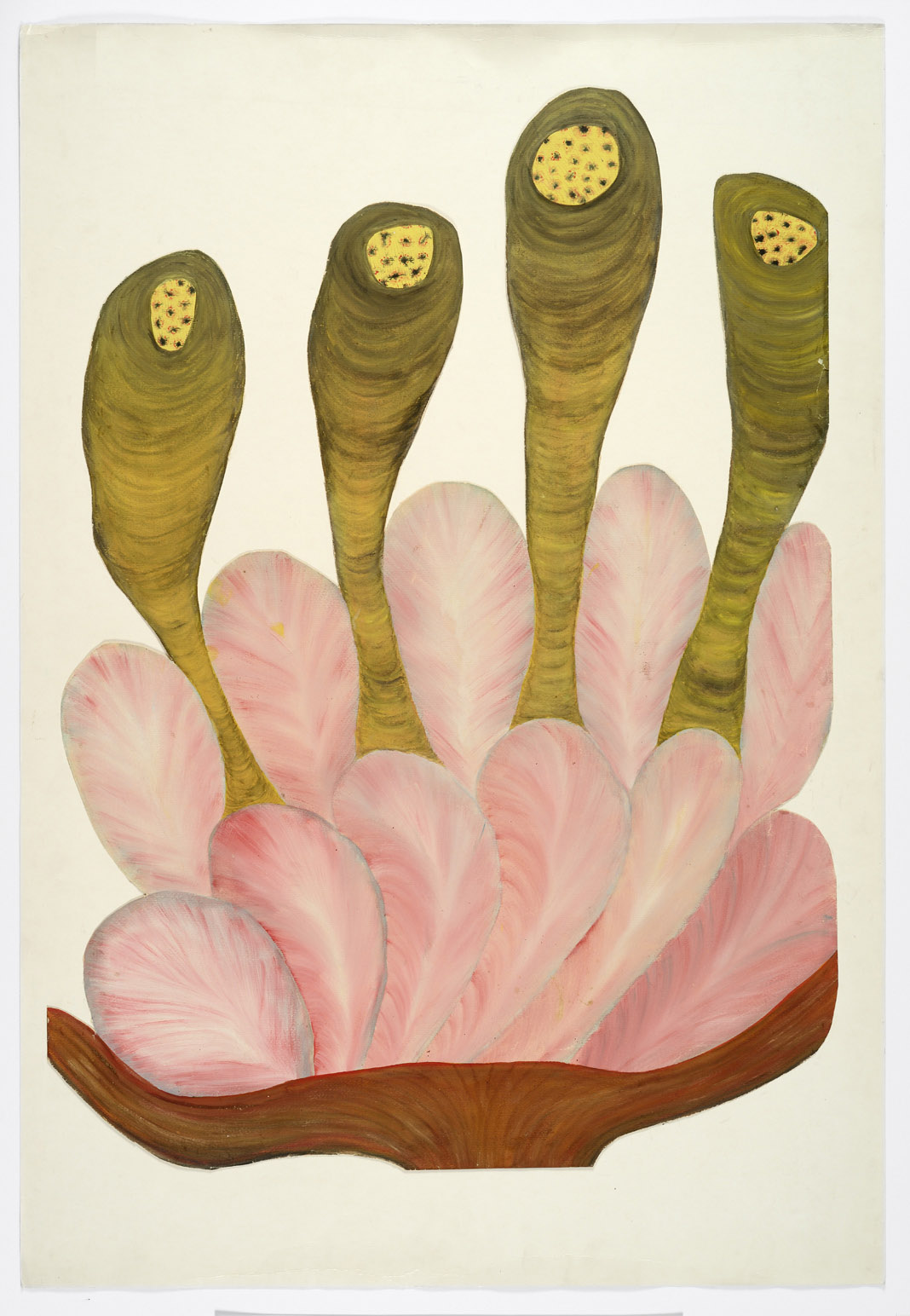
Homage to Picasso, tempera and ink, 1960s

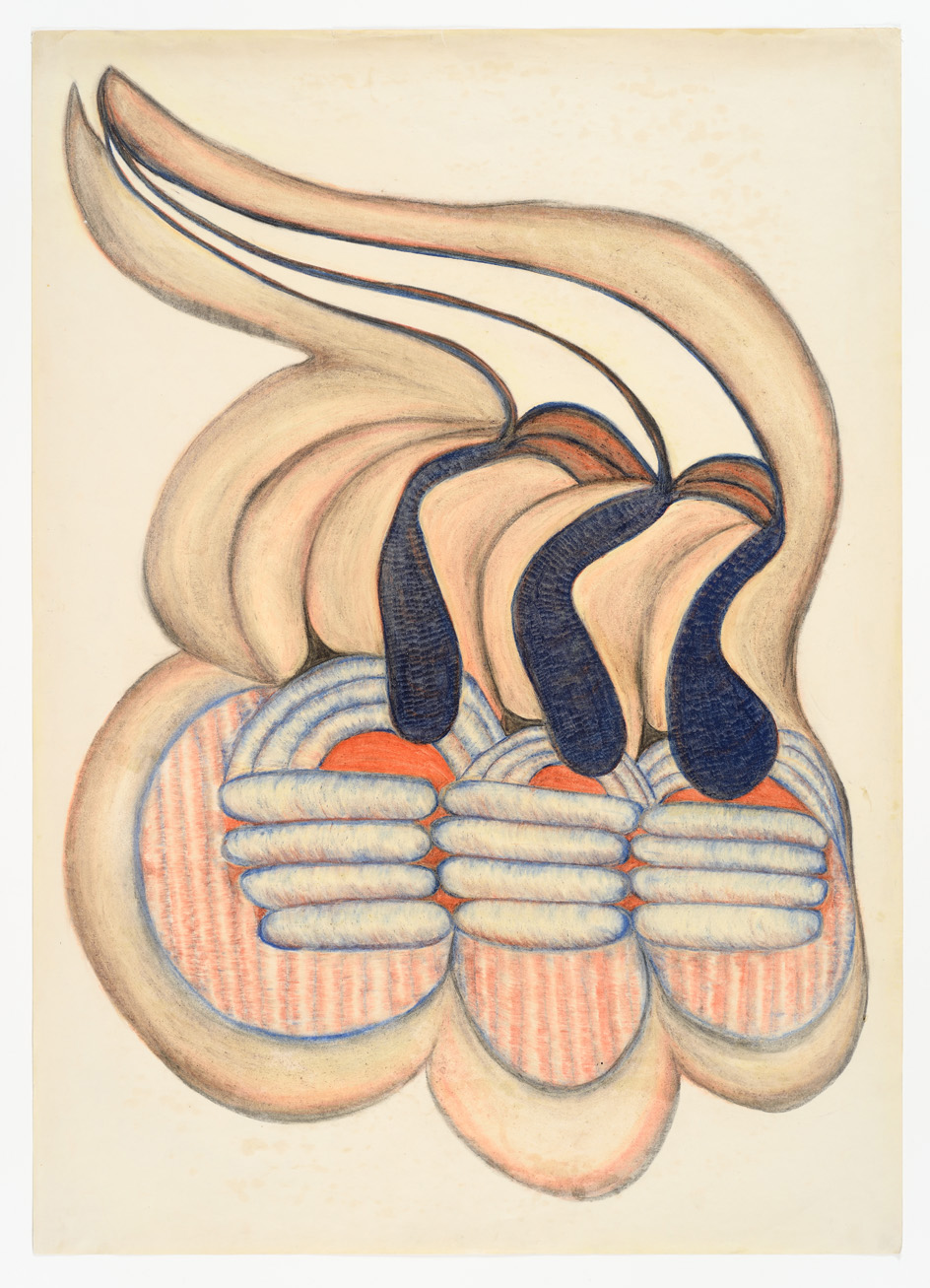
Flowers with the Taste of Potato Cones, pastel, 1960s

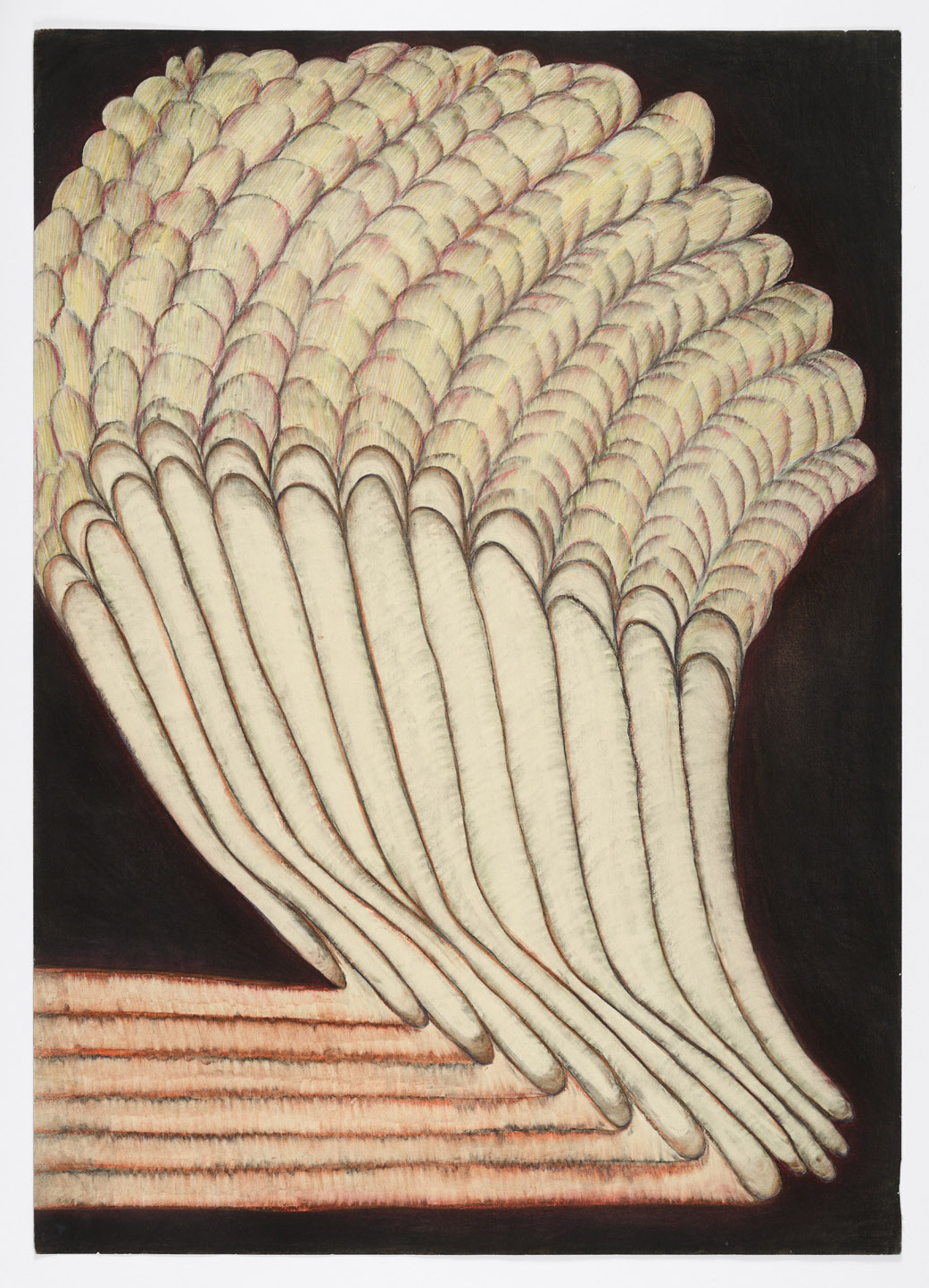
Untitled, pastel, 60s

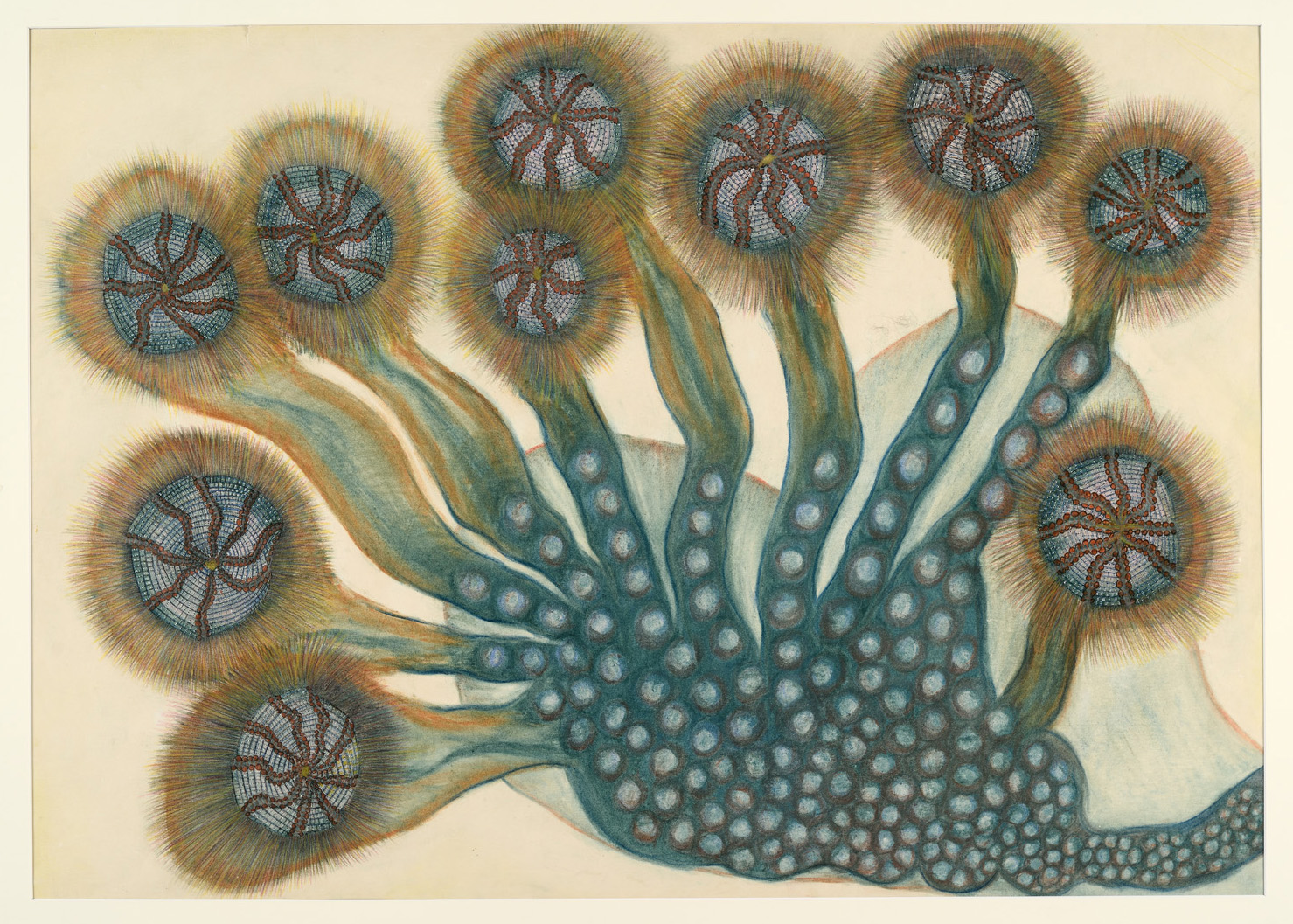
Untitled, pastel, ink, mid-1960s

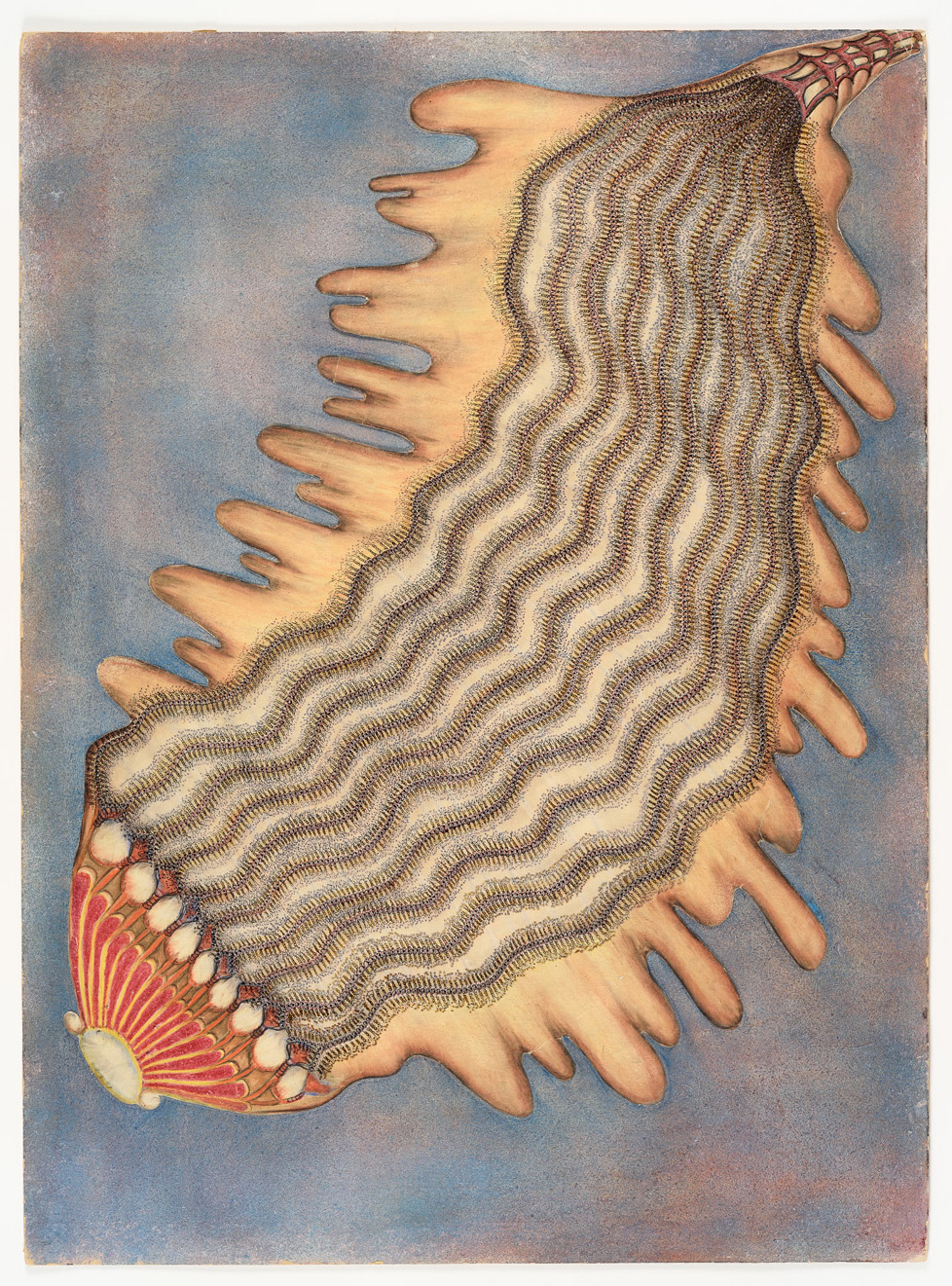
Electric Fruit, pastel, ink on cut-out shape, 1960s

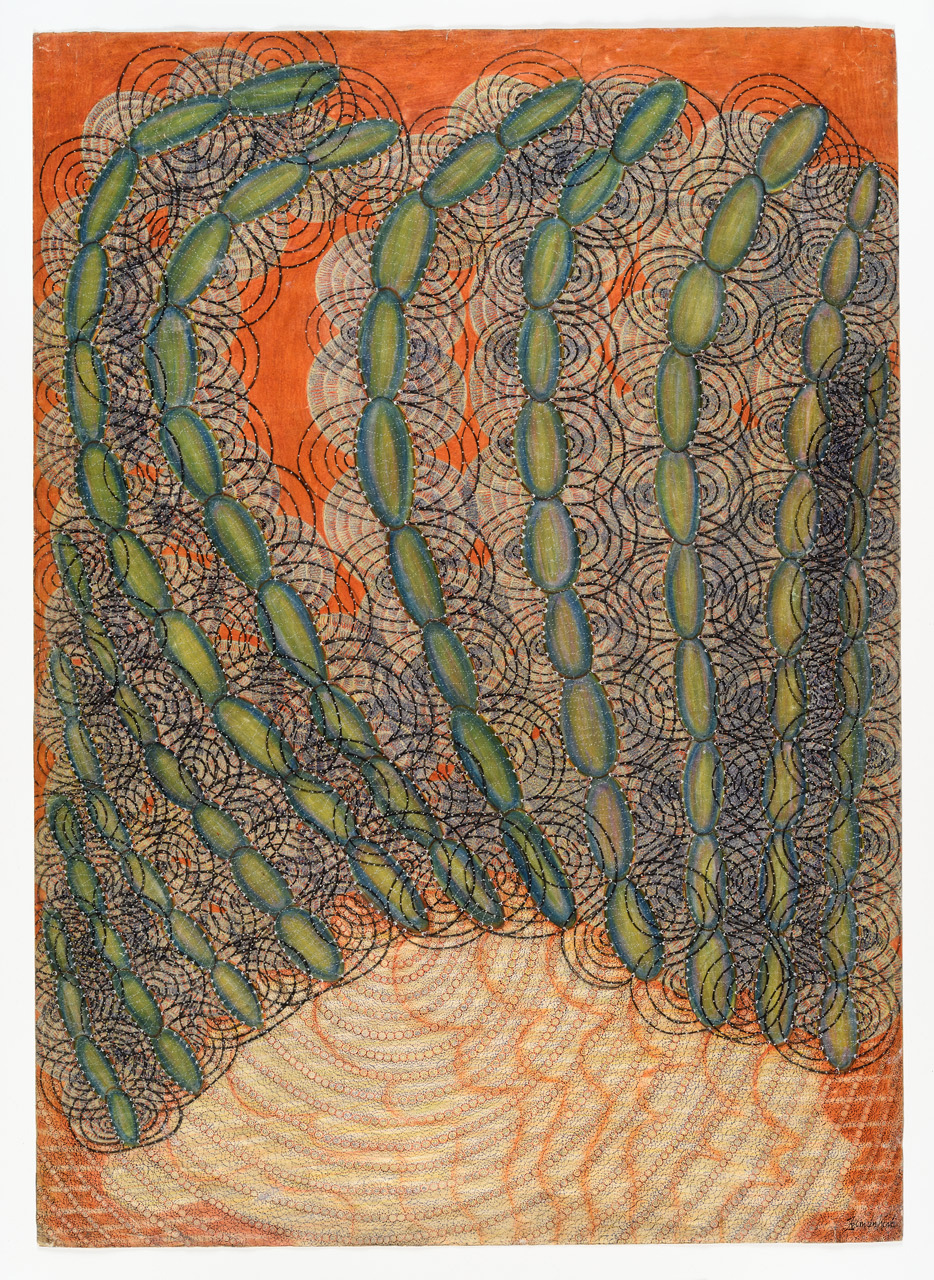
Electric flower, pastel, ink, pen, 1960s

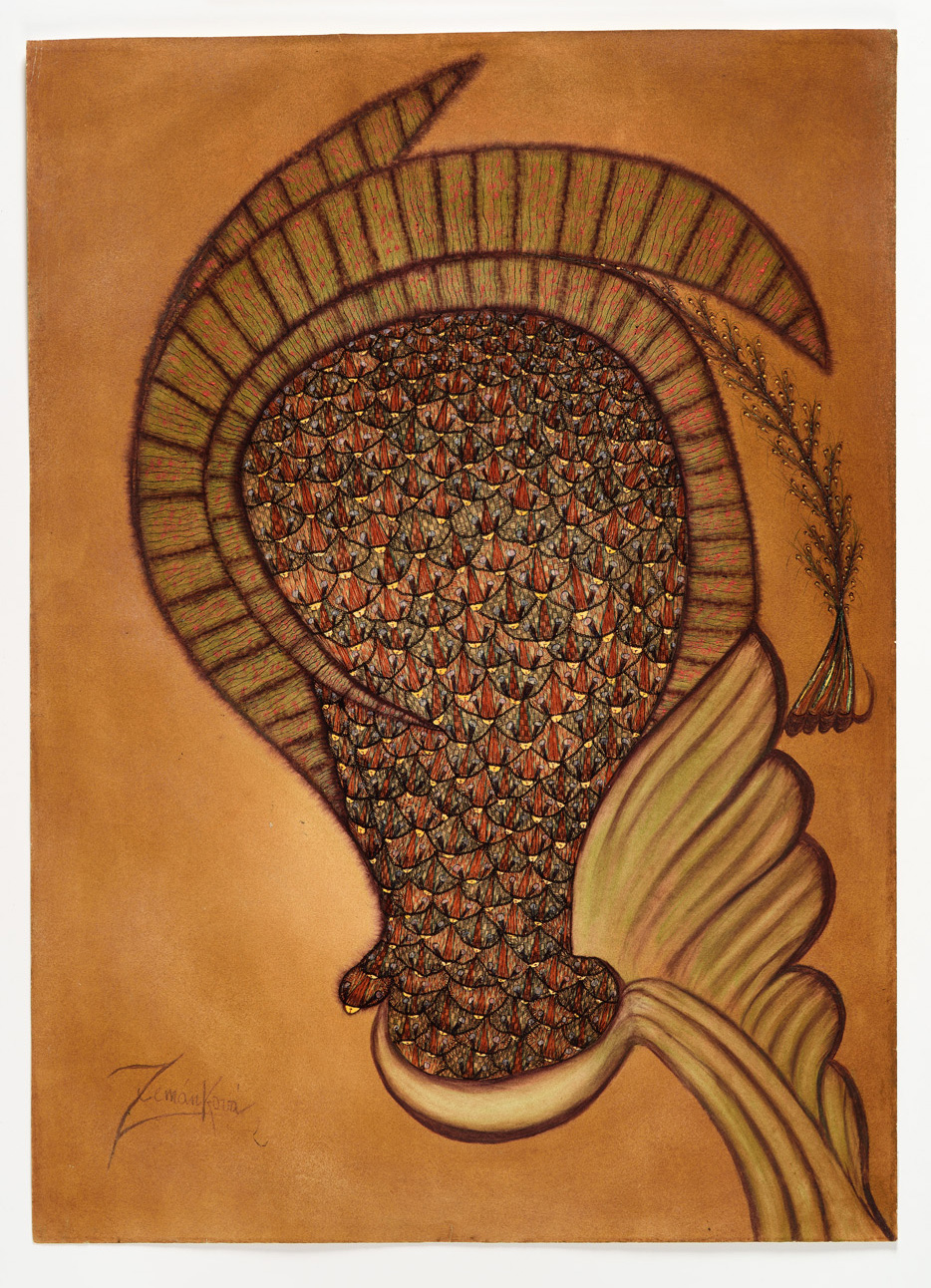
Untitled, pastel and ink, 1960s

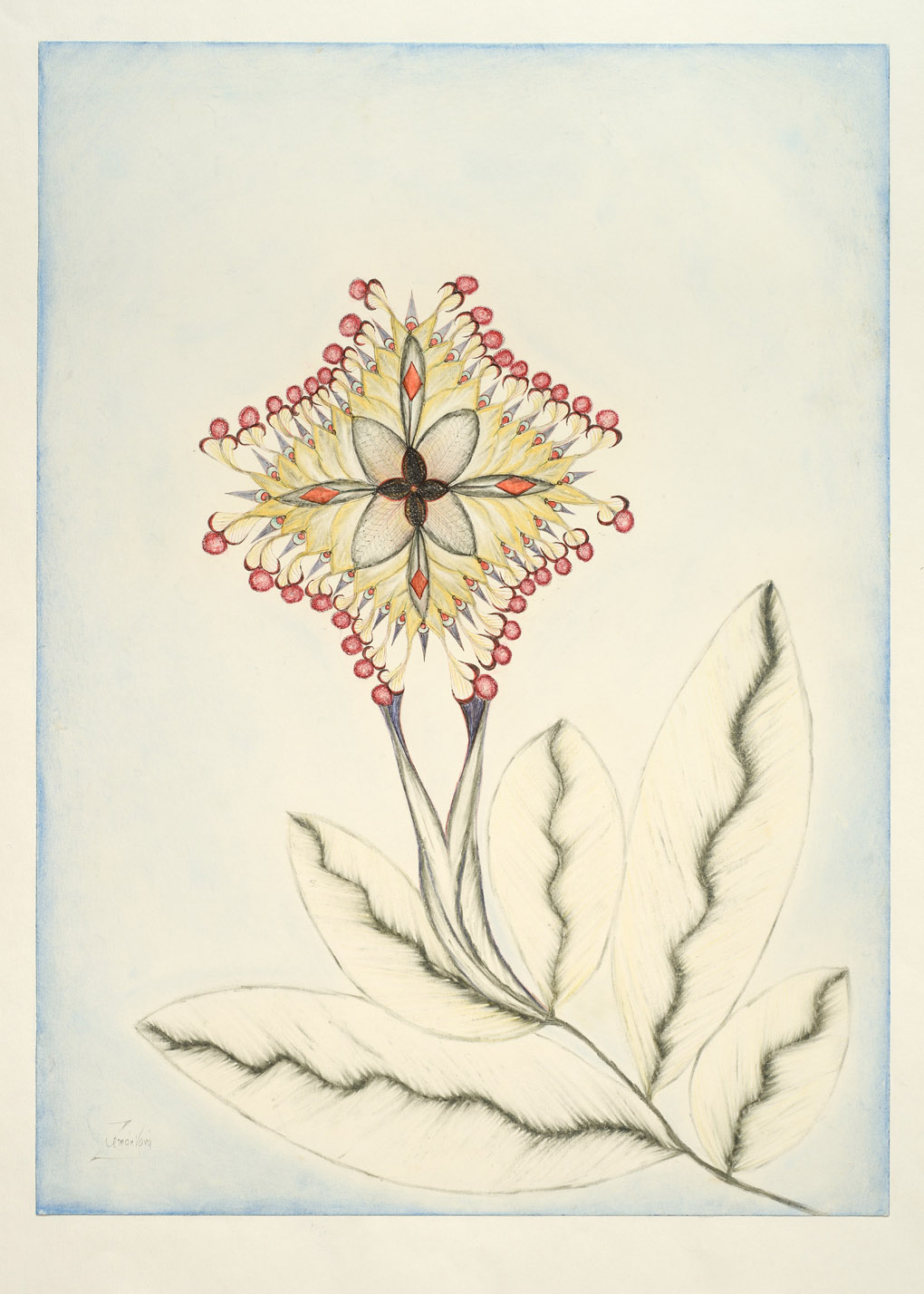
Untitled, pastel and pen, 1970s

One stage of the drawings is represented by meticulously constructed microscopic details assembled into exploded tissues. Anna Zemánková has often consistently rendered tens of thousands of dots and lines in a single painting. Later, in this fascination with microstructures, she discovered the technique of perforation. The possibility of illuminating a perforated drawing led her to produce lampshades with which she beautified her apartment. After her first exhibition in 1966, she temporarily succumbed to the admiration of the public, began to sign her works, and a certain mannerism and aestheticization prevailed in her work. She no longer dwelled on small drawings, the background of her drawings were effectively shaded by spreading coloured pigment and her compositions became more decorative.

The 1970s represent a new peak in her work. Against a subtly tinted background, she created floating and hallucinatorily perfect flowers that give a detached impression despite their meticulously executed drawings. She combines pastel with crayon and pen to mark out the lines and uses aniline paint to accentuate the colours. She has also begun to create drawings for her admirers on small postcard formats and on small handmade paper cards. These she then sent out as invitations or New Year's cards.

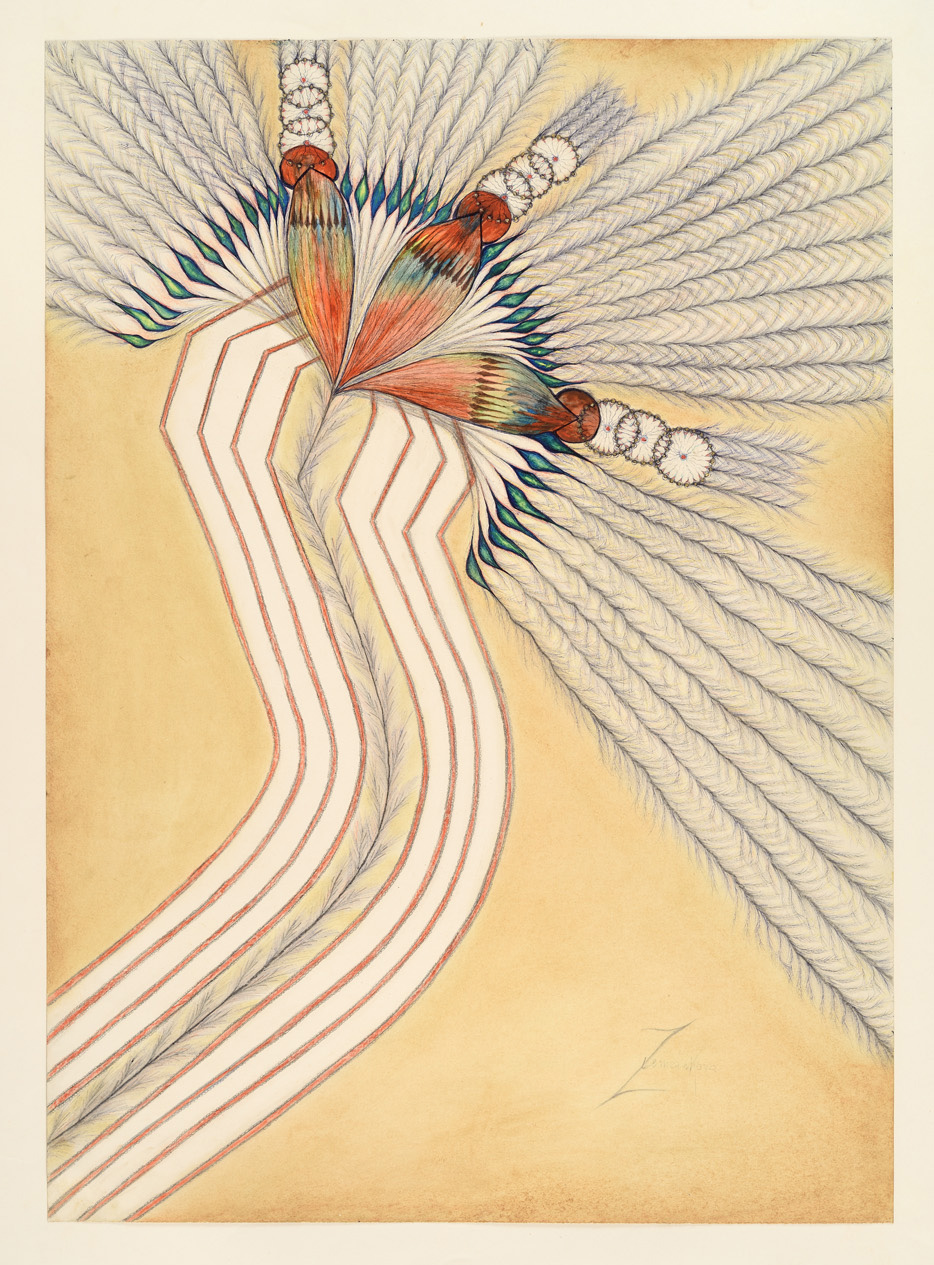
Untitled, pastel, pen, aniline colours, first half of the 1970s

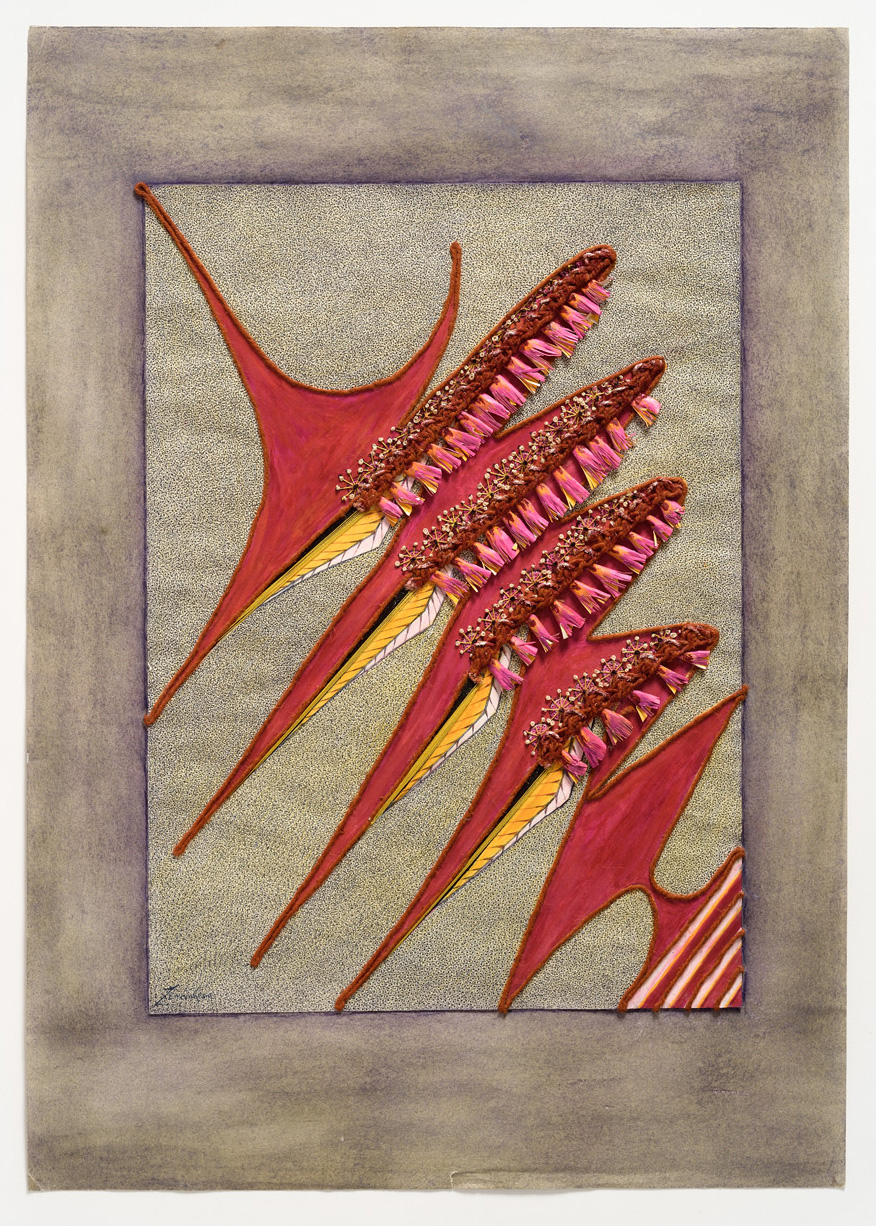
Untitled, drawing and paper relief on perforated paper, 1970s

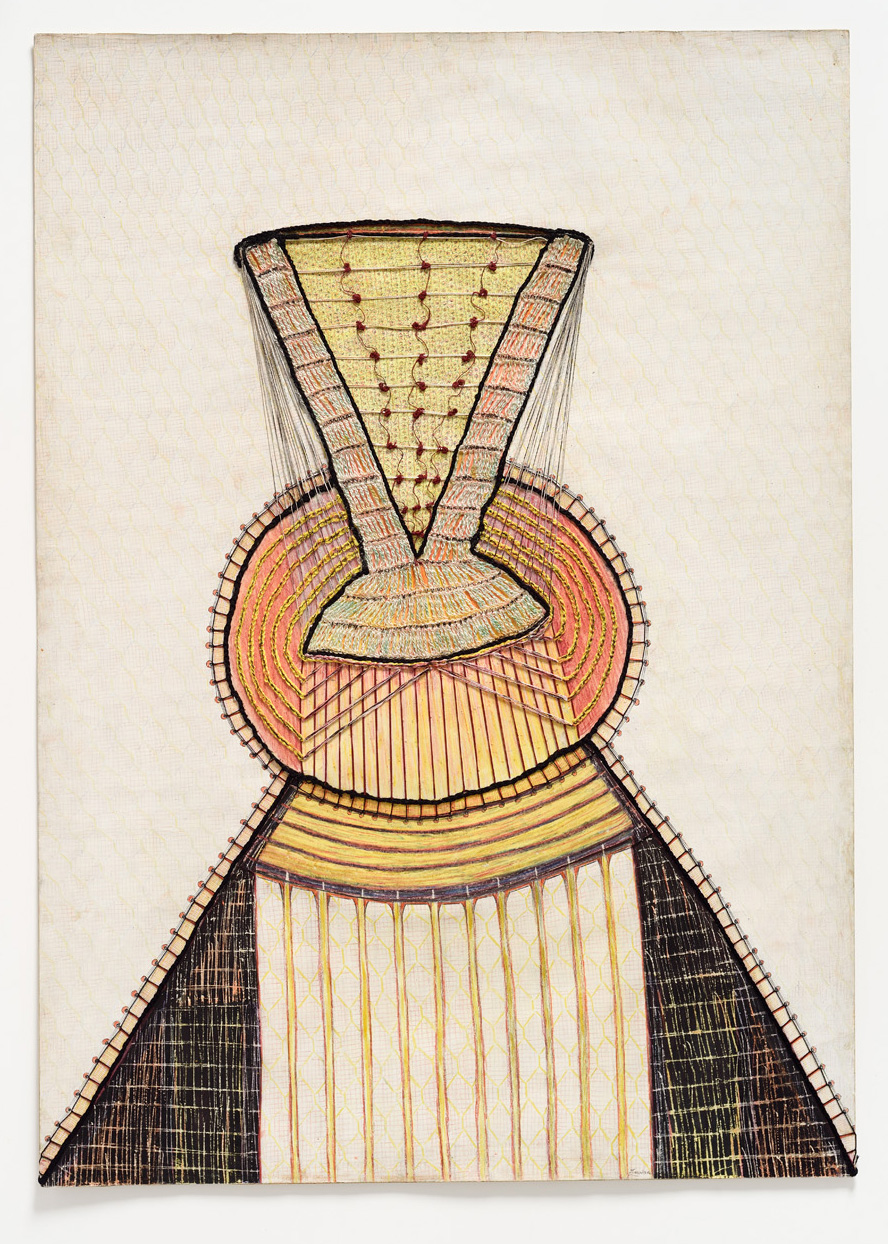
Untitled, drawing and crochet appliqué with embroidery, first half of the 1970s

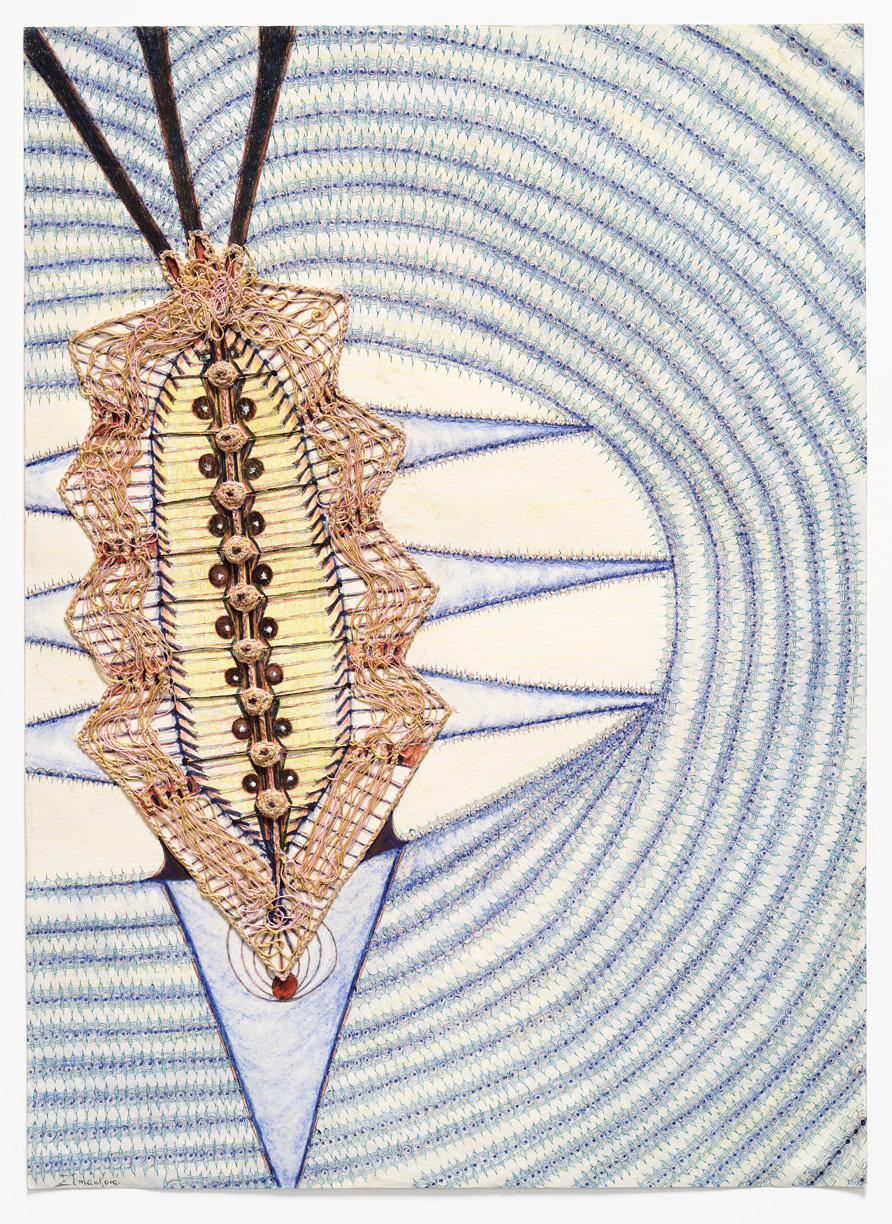
Untitled, drawing and crochet appliqué with embroidery, 1st half of the 1970s

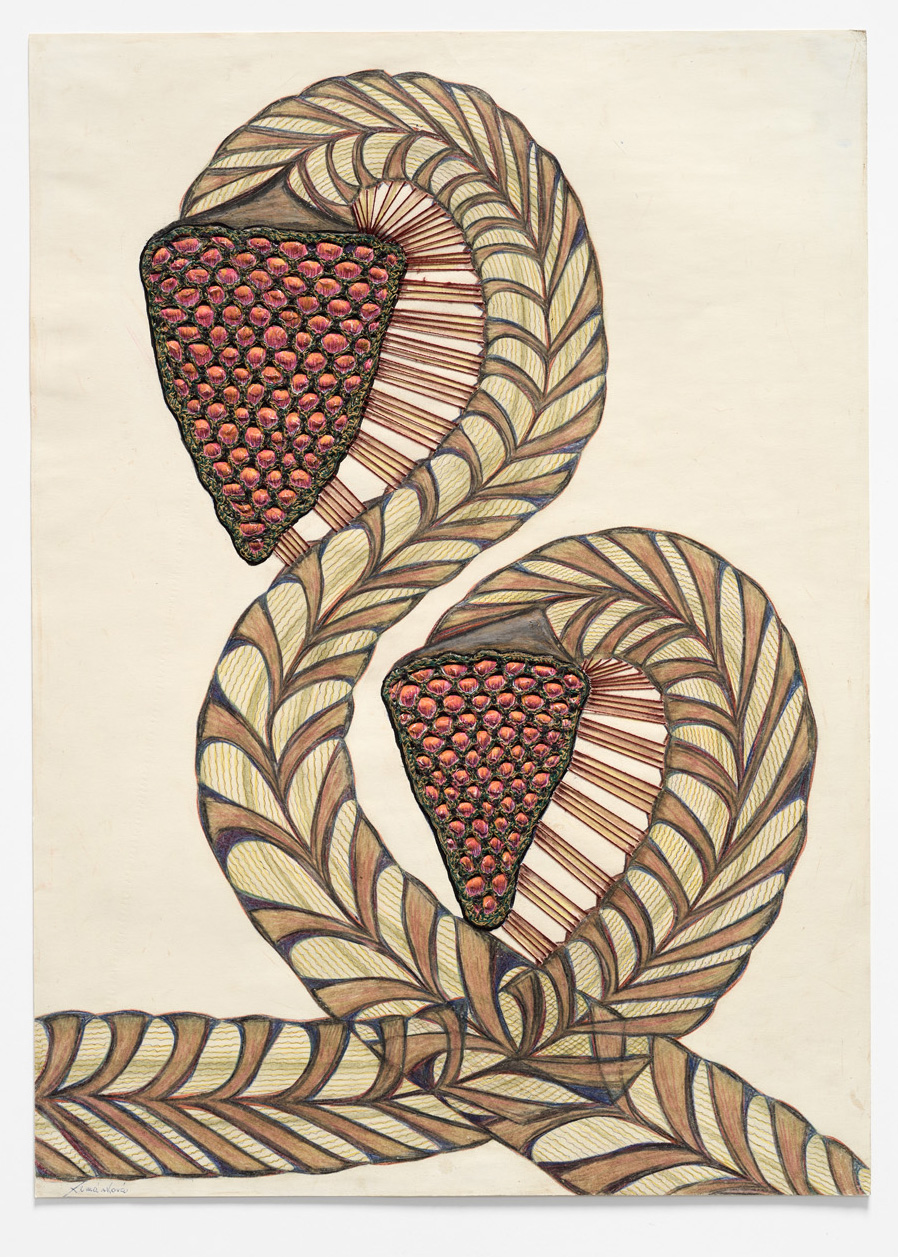
Untitled, drawing and crochet appliqué with embroidery, 1st half of the 1970s

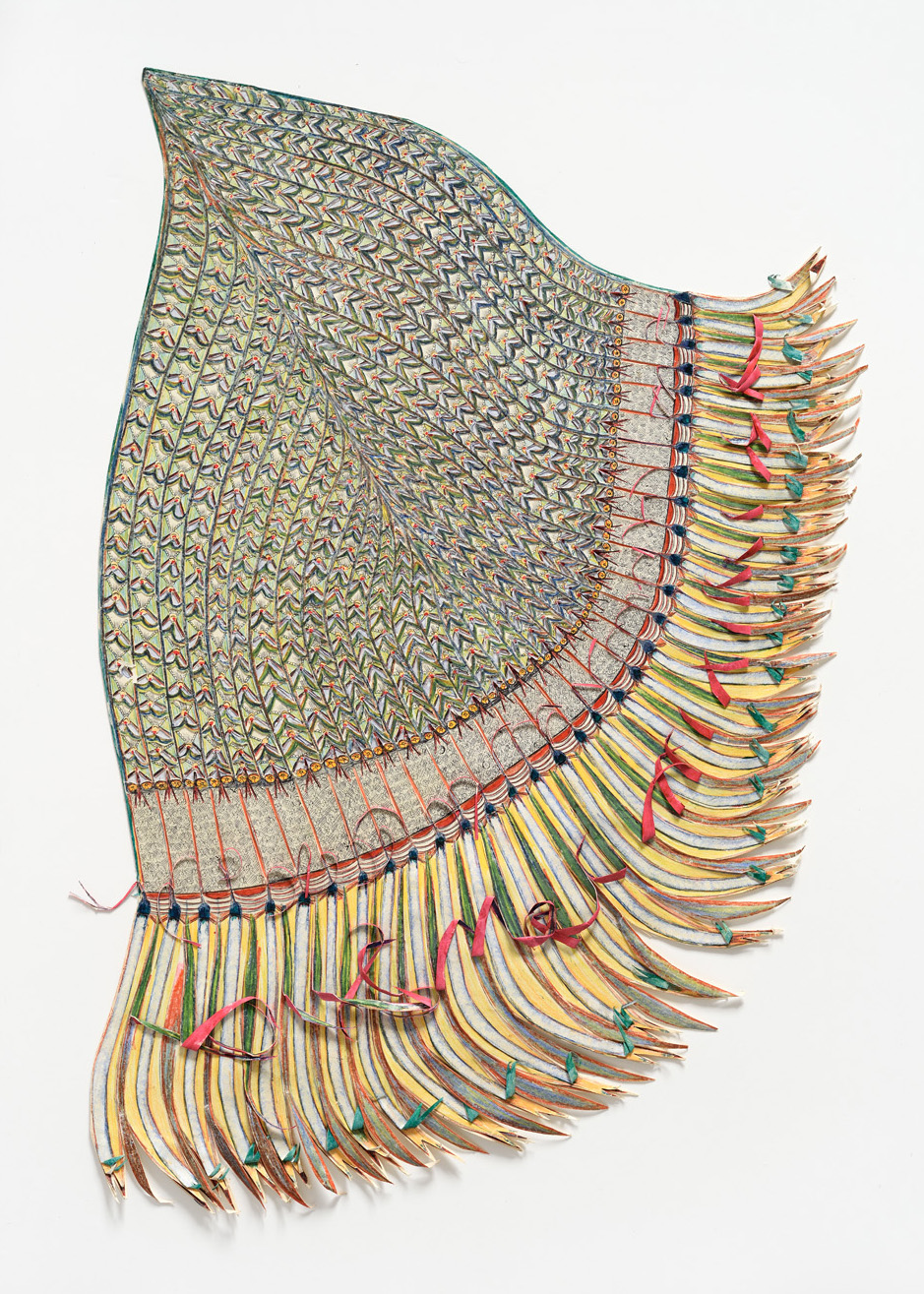
New Year drawing on cut paper, 1977

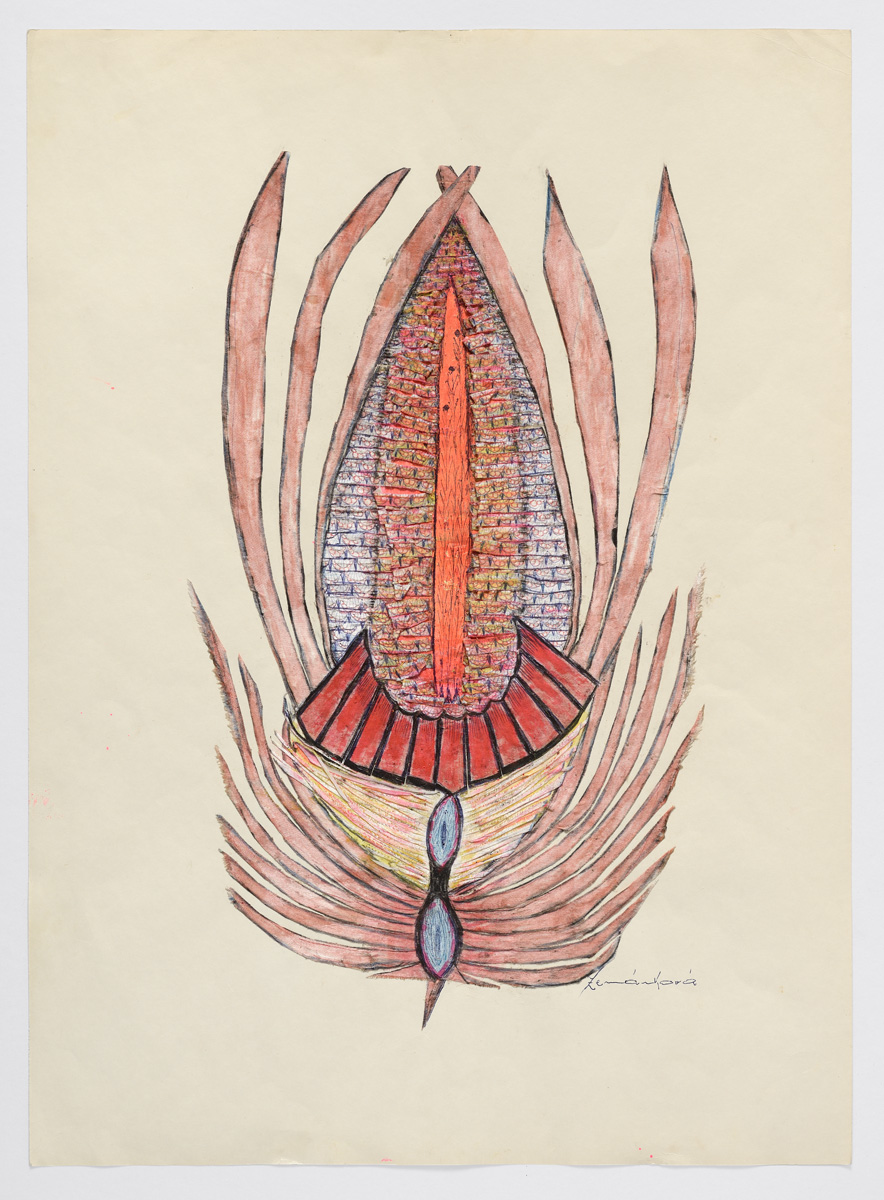
Untitled, satin collage, late 1970s/early 1980s

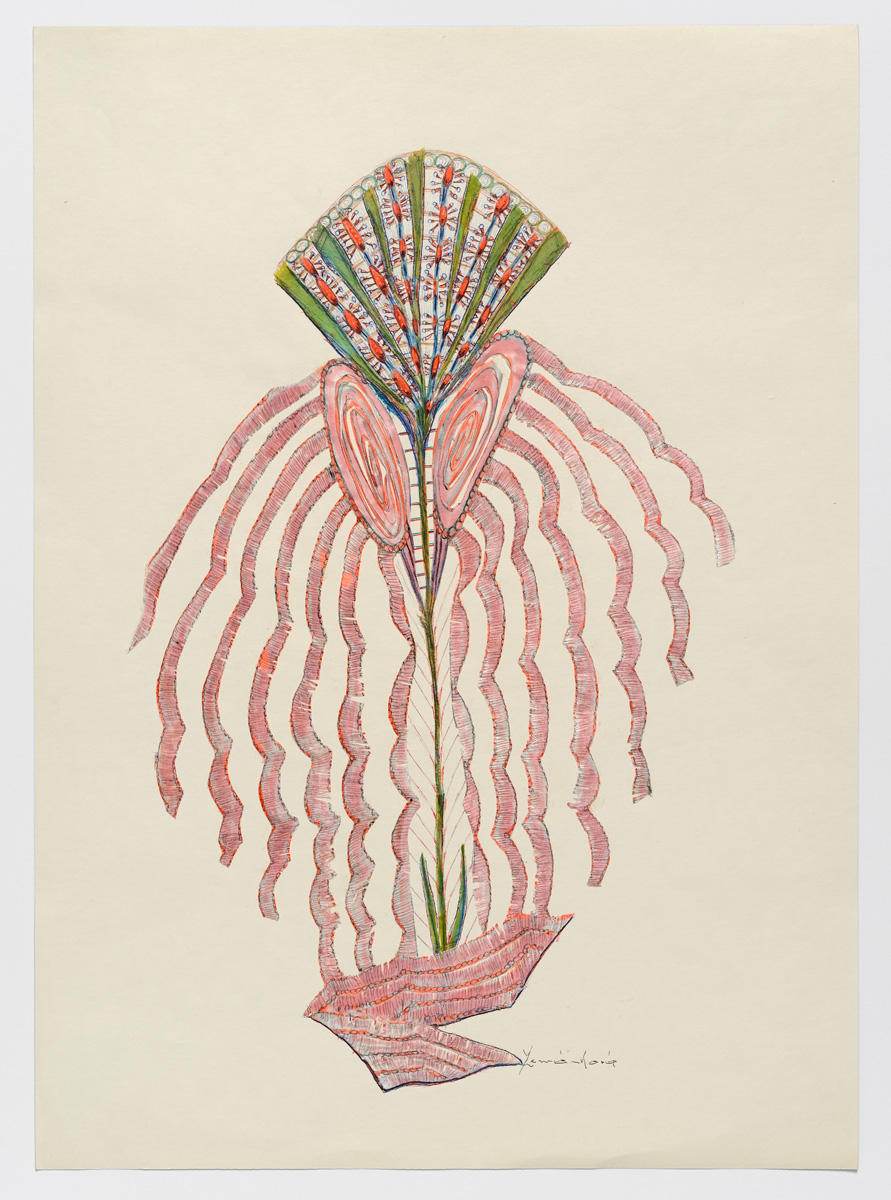
Untitled, satin collage, late 1970s/early 1980s

Handmade paper also inspired her to use the technique of embossing wet paper on a soft polystyrene backing. She then reinforced the resulting relief with glue. She also began to use the technique of collage, using layered papers to create hanging objects such as allegorical birds or butterflies. She sewed lace crocheted from cotton or artificial lycra into her drawings and added beads, sequins and glass diamonds. These assemblages were close in meaning to sacred objects or reliquaries. It is easy to overlook the rawness of the gesture and the intense power emanating from the result because of the beauty of the flowers, the rich colors of the cottons, the beads, and the luster of the satin from which she assembled her assemblages.

In the second half of the 1970s, she created textile collages from scraps of satin, which she starched and, after gluing to a paper backing, decorated with ornamental marks using fabric paint, pen, pastel or marker. Using the same technique she used in her work, Anna Zemánková decorated curtains, upholstery, lampshades or her own hats, thus fulfilling the principle of "bricolage", whereby her living space merged into a (Gesamtkunstwerk).

=== Representation in collections ===
==== Abroad ====
- Collection de l'Art Brut, Lausanne, Switzerland
- ABCD, Bruno Decharme collection, Paris, France
- L'Aracine, LAM, Villeneuve d'Ascq, France
- Musée de la création franche, Bègles, France
- Museum Dr. Guislain, Ghent, Belgium
- Zander Collection, Cologne, Germany
- Slovak National Gallery, Bratislava
- Arnulf Rainer Museum, Baden, Austria
- American Folk Art Museum, New York, USA
- Milwaukee Art Museum, Milwaukee, USA
- Philadelphia Museum of Art, Philadelphia, USA
- Museum of International Folk Art, Santa Fe, USA
- Antoine de Galbert Collection, Paris, France
- The Museum of Everything, UK
- The Musgrave Kinley Outsider Art Collection, London
- Korine and Max E. Ammann Collection, Switzerland
- Amr Shaker, Geneva, Switzerland
- Stichting Collectie De Stadshof, Utrecht
- Mickey Cartin Collection, USA
- Gregory Amenoff Collection, USA
- Dow Jones, New York, USA
- Audrey Heckler's collection, USA
- Blanchard-Hill collection, USA
- Cavin-Morris Gallery Collection, USA
- Treger-Saint Silvestre Collection, São João da Madeira, Portugal
- The Anthony Petullo Collection of Self-Taught and Outsider art, Milwaukee, USA

==== Domestic collections ====
- North Bohemia Art Gallery in Litoměřice
- Museum of Art Olomouc
- Silent Ocean, Prague
- Poetic Gallery, Prague
- Eva and Jan Švankmajer Collection
- Collection of Dana and Pavel Konečný
- Collection of Milada and Jiří Anderl
- Collection of Milada and Anton Kollár
- Collection of the family of Anna Zemánek

=== Exhibitions (selection) ===
- 1964, 1967, 1968, 1970 Open Days, Apartment of Anna Zemánková, Prague, Czech Republic
- 1966 Anna Zemánková, Na zábradlí Theatre, Prague
- 1980 The Fantastic Creation of Mrs. Zemánková, Theatre of Music, Olomouc
- 1982 Labyrinths of Fantasy. Anna Zemánková and Cecílie Marková, Theatre of Music, Olomouc
- 1990 Mrs Zemánková: Pastels, Gallery of Fine Arts in Cheb
- 1993 Bohumil Zemánek and Mrs. Zemánková, Václav Špála Gallery, Prague
- 1994 Bohumil Zemánek and Mrs. Zemánková, Moravian Gallery in Brno
- 1993 The Lark of Exaltation: Mediumistic Drawings by Anna Zemánková, Cavin-Morris Gallery, New York
- 1993 Bohumil Zemánek and Mrs. Zemánková, Václav Špála Gallery, Prague, Moravian Gallery in Brno
- 1997 Exotic Species: The Art of Anna Zemánková, High Museum of Art, Atlanta, USA
- 1998 Drawings by Anna Zemánková, Cavin-Morris Gallery, New York
- 1998/2000 Oiric Visions of Anna Zemánková, Gallery of Fine Arts in Cheb, Museum of Art Olomouc, North Bohemian Gallery of Fine Arts in Litoměřice
- 1999 Anna Zemánková, Cavin-Morris Gallery, New York
- 1999 L'art brut: Anna Zemánková, Czech Centre, Vienna
- 2000 Anna Zemánková, Galerie Susanne Zander, Cologne, Galerie Hamer, Amsterdam
- 2001 Prague-Gnosis: Anna Zemánková and Jindřich Vik, Cavin-Morris Gallery, New York
- 2003 Anna Zemánková: Plants of dreams, Colon books exhibition, Tokyo, Japan
- 2006 Flowers of Passion by Anna Zemánková, Na palubě Gallery, Olomouc
- 2006 Magical Visions of Eva Droppová and Anna Zemánková, Gallery X, Bratislava
- 2007 From the depths upwards. Visionaries of Czechoslovak Art Brut. Eva Droppová, Cecilie Marková, Anna Zemánková. INSITA 2007, Slovak National Gallery in Bratislava
- 2008 Anna Zemánková, Cavin-Morris Gallery, New York
- 2008 Anna Zemánková, Galerie Sardine collée au mur, Geneva
- 2008/2009 Anna Zemánková, Galerie Havelka, Prague
- 2009 Anatomy Metamorphosis. Luboš Plný & Anna Zemánková, abcd la galerie, Montreuil, France
- 2009 Anna Zemánková, Czech Organism, Yukiko Koide Presents, Tokyo, Japan
- 2009 By Magical Means - Drawings by Anna Zemánková, Pollock Gallery, Dallas, Texas, USA
- 2011/2012 Art Brut: Anatomy Metamorphosis. Anna Zemánková, Luboš Plný and František Dymáček, Museum Montanelli, Prague, Saarländische Galerie - Europäisches Kunstforum, Berlin
- 2012 Anatomia Metamorphosis. Luboš Plný & Anna Zemánková: Works from the abcd Collection, Hyogo Prefectural Museum of Art, Kobe; Hiroshima City Museum of Contemporary Art, Hiroshima,
- 2013 ACM + Anna Zemánková, Frieze London [Masters section], Museum of Everything, London, UK
- 2013 Anna Zemánková, hortus deliciarum, Galerie Christian Berst, Paris
- 2014 Chris Hipkiss & Anna Zemánková, Galerie Gugging, Maria Gugging, Austria
- 2015 Spirited Women: Drawing Down Fire, Cavin-Morris Gallery, New York
- 2015 Sandra Sheehy and Anna Zemánková: Botanical, John Michael Kohler Arts Center, Sheboygan, USA
- 2016 Twilight before dawn: Anna Zemánková, Cavin-Morris Gallery, New York
- 2017 Anna Zemánková, Collection de l'Art Brut, Lausanne
- 2018 Anna Zemánková: Joyful Message to the Unknown, North Bohemian Gallery of Fine Arts, Litoměřice
- 2019 Anna Zemánková: Flowers of Invisible Gardens, Jiří Jílek Gallery, Šumperk
- 2019 Anna Zemánková, Weiss Berlin, Berlin
- 2019/2020 Anna Zemánková: Spiele im Morgengrauen, Österreichische Gesellschaft vom Goldenen Kreuze, Vienna

== Sources ==
=== Monographs ===
- Anežka Šimková, Terezie Zemánková (eds.), Anna Zemánková, 304 p., KANT-Karel Kerlický, ABCD Prague 2017, ISBN 978-80-7437-188-2 (KANT), ISBN 978-80-905168-7-8 (ABCD)

=== Catalogues ===
- Daněk L, Pohribný A, (eds.), Oinirical visions of Anna Zemánková, Olomouc 1998
- Nádvorníková, Alena. Art Brut in Bohemia and Moravia. Exh. Cat., Foreword by Madeleine Lommel and Joëlle Pijaudier-Cabot., illustrated, with a traveling venue, Galerie Hlavního města Prahy 1998
- Anna Zemánková, catalogue by Terezie Zemánková, ABCD Prague 2003
- Decharme B (ed), Anatomia Metamorphosis: Luboš Plný & Anna Zemánková, texts by M. Anceau, B. Safarova, T. Zemánková, abcd, Paris 2009
- Safarova B, Zemánková T, (eds.), Art brut. Anatomia Metamorphosis. Anna Zemánková, Galerie Montanelli, Prague 2011
- Safarova B, Hattori T, (eds.), Anatomia Metamorphosis. Luboš Plný & Anna Zemánková. Works from the abcd Collection, texts by B. Decharme, T. Hattori, B. Safarova, T. Zemánková, Gendaikikakushitsu Publishers, Tokyo 2012
- Berst Ch, (ed.), Anna Zemánková: hortus deliciarum, texts by M. Anceau, Ch. Berst, T. Zemánková, Galerie Christian Berst, Paris 2013
- Morris R, (ed.), Twilight Before Dawn: Anna Zemánková, text by T. Zemánková, Cavin-Morris Gallery, New York 2016 on-line catalogue

=== Other ===
- Tschechischer Surrealismus und Art Brut zum Ende des Jahrtausends, text by Jan Švankmajer et al, 47 p., Palais Pálffy (Österreichisches Kulturzentrum), Vienna 2000
- L’Art Brut Tchèque, Martine Lusardy and Alena Nádvorníková, Halle Saint Pierre, Exhibition catalogue, Paris, France 2002
- Tsjechische l´art brut tchèque, text Jan Švankmajer et al., 82 p., Centre tchèque de Bruxelles, Brussels 2004
- Alena Nádvorníková, Art brut in the Czech Lands: Mediums, Solitaires, Psychotics, Arbor vitae, Museum of Art Olomouc 2007, ISBN 978-80-86300-95-5
