= Afro-Atlantic Histories =

Touring art exhibition

- Original 2018 exhibition catalogue, featuring Zeferina (2018) by Dalton Paula
- Date: June 29–October 21, 2018
- Venue: São Paulo Museum of Art and Instituto Tomie Ohtake
- Location: São Paulo
- Theme: Diasporic African art
- Touring dates: October 24, 2021–January 17, 2022; April 10–July 17, 2022; December 11, 2022–September 10, 2023; October 22, 2023–February 11, 2024
- Touring venues: Museum of Fine Arts, Houston; National Gallery of Art; Los Angeles County Museum of Art; Dallas Museum of Art
- Touring locations: Houston; Washington, D.C.; Los Angeles; Dallas

Afro-Atlantic Histories (Portuguese: Histórias Afro-Atlânticas) is the title of a touring art exhibition first held jointly at the São Paulo Museum of Art (MASP) and the Instituto Tomie Ohtake in Brazil in 2018. The exhibition was made up of artworks and historical artifacts from and about the African diaspora, specifically focusing "on the 'ebbs and flows' among Africa, Americas, Caribbean and also Europe." Built around the concept of histórias, a Portuguese term that can include fictional and non-fictional narratives, Afro-Atlantic Histories explores the artistic, political, social, and personal impacts and legacies of the Transatlantic slave trade. The exhibition was hailed by critics as a landmark show of diasporic African art.

Following the original 2018 exhibition, MASP partnered with the Museum of Fine Arts, Houston, and the National Gallery of Art in Washington, D.C., to bring a version of the exhibition to several museums in the United States from 2021 to 2024.

== History ==
Afro-Atlantic Histories was first shown at the São Paulo Museum of Art (MASP) and the Instituto Tomie Ohtake from June 29 to October 21, 2018, as part of MASP's ongoing Histórias exhibition series, each exploring a different community, identity, or artistic practice in depth. The exhibition was curated by Adriano Pedrosa, Ayrson Heráclito, Hélio Menezes, Lilia Moritz Schwarcz, and Tomás Toledo.

Following the first exhibition, then-Museum of Fine Arts, Houston (MFAH) curator Kanitra Fletcher worked with the original curators to adapt the show for MFAH and the National Gallery of Art (NGA), where she was named the NGA's first Associate Curator of African American and Afro-Diasporic Art in 2021. The adapted version featured a smaller number of artworks with a broader geographic focus. Molly Donovan of the NGA and Steven Nelson of the NGA's Center for Advanced Study in the Visual Arts contributed to the curation of the American tour. The exhibition was shown at MFAH from October 24, 2021 to January 17, 2022 and the NGA from April 10 to July 17, 2022.

The opening reception for Afro-Atlantic Histories at the NGA was attended by Vice President Kamala Harris. Over 140,000 people visited the show at the NGA and a museum spokesperson said it was "one of the exhibits that has generated the most interest in recent years."

The exhibition was on view at the Los Angeles County Museum of Art from December 11, 2022 through September 10, 2023. The exhibition tour concluded at the Dallas Museum of Art from October 22, 2023 to February 11, 2024.

== Themes ==
=== Original exhibition themes ===
Afro-Atlantic Histories was originally organized into eight thematic sections, six of which were located at MASP and two of which were located at the Instituto Tomie Ohtake. The original exhibition included a large number of works by Afro-Brazilian artists as well as pieces by artists from around the world. Artworks for the original exhibition were loaned from a variety of international museums and galleries, including the Metropolitan Museum of Art, New York; J. Paul Getty Museum, Los Angeles; National Gallery of Art, Washington, D.C.; Menil Collection, Houston; Uffizi Gallery, Florence; Musée du quai Branly, Paris; National Portrait Gallery, London; Victoria and Albert Museum, London; National Gallery of Denmark, Copenhagen; National Museum of Fine Arts of Havana; and National Gallery of Jamaica.

Themes at MASP:

- Maps and Margins (Mapas e Margens)
- Daily Life (Vida Cotidiana)
- Celebrations and Religions (Festas e Religiões)
- Portraits (Retratos)
- Routes and Trances: Africa, Jamaica, Bahia (Rotas e Transes: África, Jamaica, Bahia)
- African-Atlantic Modernisms (Modernismos Afro-Âtlanticos)

Themes at the Instituto Tomie Ohtake:

- Emancipations (Emancipações)
- Activism and Resistance (Ativismos e Resistências)

=== Adapted exhibition themes ===
The American tour of Afro-Atlantic Histories featured six of the eight themes from the original exhibition, with several themes slightly modified. NGA curator Kanitra Fletcher said that while the changes to the exhibition contextualized it for North American audiences and included more works by African Americans, "we're not thinking of it as an African American show," further noting a "global Blackness" present in both the original and adapted versions.

Themes on U.S. tour and example works:

- Maps and Margins
  - James Phillips: Description of a Slave Ship (1789); Frank Bowling: Night Journey (1969-1970); Rosana Paulino: The Permanence of Structures (2017); Jaime Lauriano: Portuguese Stones #2 (2017); José Alves de Olinda: Slave Ship (2019); Hank Willis Thomas: A Place to Call Home (Africa America Reflection) (2020)
- Enslavements and Emancipations
  - Samuel Raven: Celebrating the Emancipation of Slaves in British Dominions, August 1834 (c.1834); Nathaniel Jocelyn: Portrait of Cinque (1839-1840); John Quincy Adams Ward: The Freedman (1862-1863); Thomas Satterwhite: The Last Sale of Slaves in St. Louis, Missouri (c.1880); Melvin Edwards: Palmares (1988), from the series Lynch Fragments; Nona Faustine: From her body sprang their greatest wealth (2013), from the series White Shoes; Arthur Jafa: Ex-Slave Gordon (2017)
- Everyday Lives
  - Frans Post: Landscape with Anteater (c.1660); Clementine Hunter: Untitled (c.1970); Barrington Watson: Conversation (1981); Ad Junior, Edu Carvalho, and Spartakus Santiago: Intervention in Rio: How to Survive an Improper Approach (2018)
- Rites and Rhythms
  - Dirk Valkenburg: Ritual Slave Party on Sugar Plantation in Surinam (1706-1708); José Montes de Oca (attrib.): Saint Benedict of Palermo (c.1734); Sénèque Obin: Carnaval (c.1956); Rubem Valentim: Composição 12 [Composition 12] (1962); Clementine Hunter: Black Jesus (c.1985)
- Portraits
  - Don Miguel de Castro, Emissary of Kongo (c.1634, author unidentified); Edna Manley: The Prophet (1935); Ben Enwonwu: Boy (c.1945); Elizabeth Catlett: Reclining Female Nude (1955); Flávio Cerqueira: Amnesia (2015); Zanele Muholi: Ntozakhe II, (Parktown) (2016); Dalton Paula: Zeferina (2018) and João de Nascimiento (2018)
- Resistances and Activism
  - Victoria Santa Cruz: They shouted black at me (1978); Faith Ringgold: Who's Afraid of Aunt Jemima? (1983); David Hammons: African-American Flag (1990); Theaster Gates: In Case of Race Riot Break the Glass (2011); Daniel Lind-Ramos: Figura de Poder (Power Figure) (2016-2018)

== Artists ==
The first showing of Afro-Atlantic Histories at MASP and the Instituto Tomie Ohtake included 450 works, ranging from the 16th to 21st centuries, by 214 artists. Artists in the original exhibition included Maxwell Alexandre, José Alves de Olinda, Sidney Amaral, Benny Andrews, Emanoel Araújo, Thomas Jones Barker, Agostinho Batista de Freitas, John T. Biggers, Skunder Boghossian, Luiz Braga, Agostinho Brunias, Flávio Cerqueira, Timótheo da Costa, Mário Cravo, Jr., Jean-Baptiste Debret, Beauford Delaney, Mestre Didi, Aaron Douglas, David Driskell, Augustus Earle, Albert Eckhout, Melvin Edwards, Ibrahim El-Salahi, Ben Enwonwu, Nona Faustine, Théodore Géricault, Adenor Gondim, Titus Kaphar, Victor Patricio Landaluze, Jaime Lauriano, Ernest Mancoba, Edna Manley, David Miller Sr., Marepe, Paulo Nazareth, Uche Okeke, Moisés Patrício, Dalton Paula, Rosana Paulino, Frans Post, Edouard Antoine Renard, Faith Ringgold, Glauber Rocha, Vincent Rosenblatt, Cameron Rowland, Pascale Marthine Tayou, Hank Willis Thomas, Rubem Valentim, Carlos Vegara, Julien Vallou de Villeneuve, Barrington Watson, Osmond Watson, Ellis Wilson, and Lynette Yiadom-Boakye.

The adapted American tour featured over 130 works from the same time range. The adapted version included a number of core works from the original showing along with newly-included works from the NGA and MFAH's collections, as well as several works from other North American museums. Artists with works new to the exhibition on the American tour include Ernest Crichlow, Theaster Gates, David Hammons, Arthur Jafa, Glenn Ligon, Daniel Lind-Ramos, Zanele Muholi, Faith Ringgold, Alma Thomas, Kara Walker, and John Quincy Adams Ward.

== Reception ==
Writing in The New York Times, Holland Cotter called the original showing of Afro-Atlantic Histories "piece for piece one of the most enthralling shows I’ve seen in years, with one visual detonation after another," further describing the exhibition as "fundamentally about resistance, and black sovereignty. It’s about change, not chains." Hyperallergic listed the original showing as one of the 20 best exhibitions of 2018 outside the United States, with critic Seph Rodney calling it "breathtaking in ambition, scope, and display," and hailing it as "one of those few exhibitions that actually delivered what it said it would."ARTnews named the São Paulo showing the 3rd most important art exhibition of the 2010s.

Following the opening of the American tour at the NGA, Philip Kennicott wrote in The Washington Post that the mixture of artistic media & time periods in the show "makes for some stunning juxtapositions," adding that the show "has tremendous symbolic importance for the National Gallery" due to its location in the NGA's West Building, the wing of the museum traditionally devoted to canonical artworks that has long included very few Black artists. Describing the NGA exhibition in ARTnews, Alex Greenberger wrote that "though Afro-Atlantic Histories features depictions of violence, it also proposes that, under the most dehumanizing circumstances, Black people across the world found means of self-possession." Writing for The Guardian about the NGA showing, David Smith said the exhibition "resists a grand narrative or definitive history but contains multitudes," noting that the first and final works of the exhibition - Hank Willis Thomas' A Place to Call Home (Africa America Reflection) (2020) and David Hammons' African-American Flag (1990), respectively - "form powerful bookends."

Writing in The New Yorker, critic Julian Lucas called the NGA showing "a powerful corrective" to traditional historical narratives of slavery that do not include Afro-Latino perspectives, further noting that the show "explores the creation of transnational unity by people of African descent." Lucas also praised the juxtapositions of works in the show; specifically, the contrasts between Arthur Jafa's Ex-Slave Gordon (2017), Eustáquio Neves' Untitled (1995), and McPherson & Oliver's The Scourged Back (c.1863); between Sidney Amaral's Neck Leash (Who Shall Speak on Our Behalf?) (2014) and Kara Walker's Restraint (2009); and between James Phillips' Description of a slave ship (1789), Emanoel Araújo's The Ship (2007), José Alves de Olinda's Slave Ship (2019), and Rosana Paulino's The Permanence of Structures (2017). Writing about the "Portraits" section of the exhibition, Lucas noted that works like Flávio Cerqueira's Amnesia (2015) and Samuel Fosso's Self-Portrait (as Liberated American Woman of the ’70s) (1997) represent "contemporary challenges to the erasure of Blackness in the West."

Critic Chase Quinn wrote in frieze that the NGA showing "[serves] as a quiet rebuttal to representations of the ‘Black experience’ that historically isolate Black history in the broader context of Western history." Quinn hailed the exhibition as a "benchmark" for its message that non-Black people are inherently intertwined with Black history. Writing in the conservative National Review, Brian T. Allen negatively reviewed the show's curatorial texts and time range, calling them "arbitrary ... jumping from one place to the next," but praised the art included in the show.

== Gallery ==
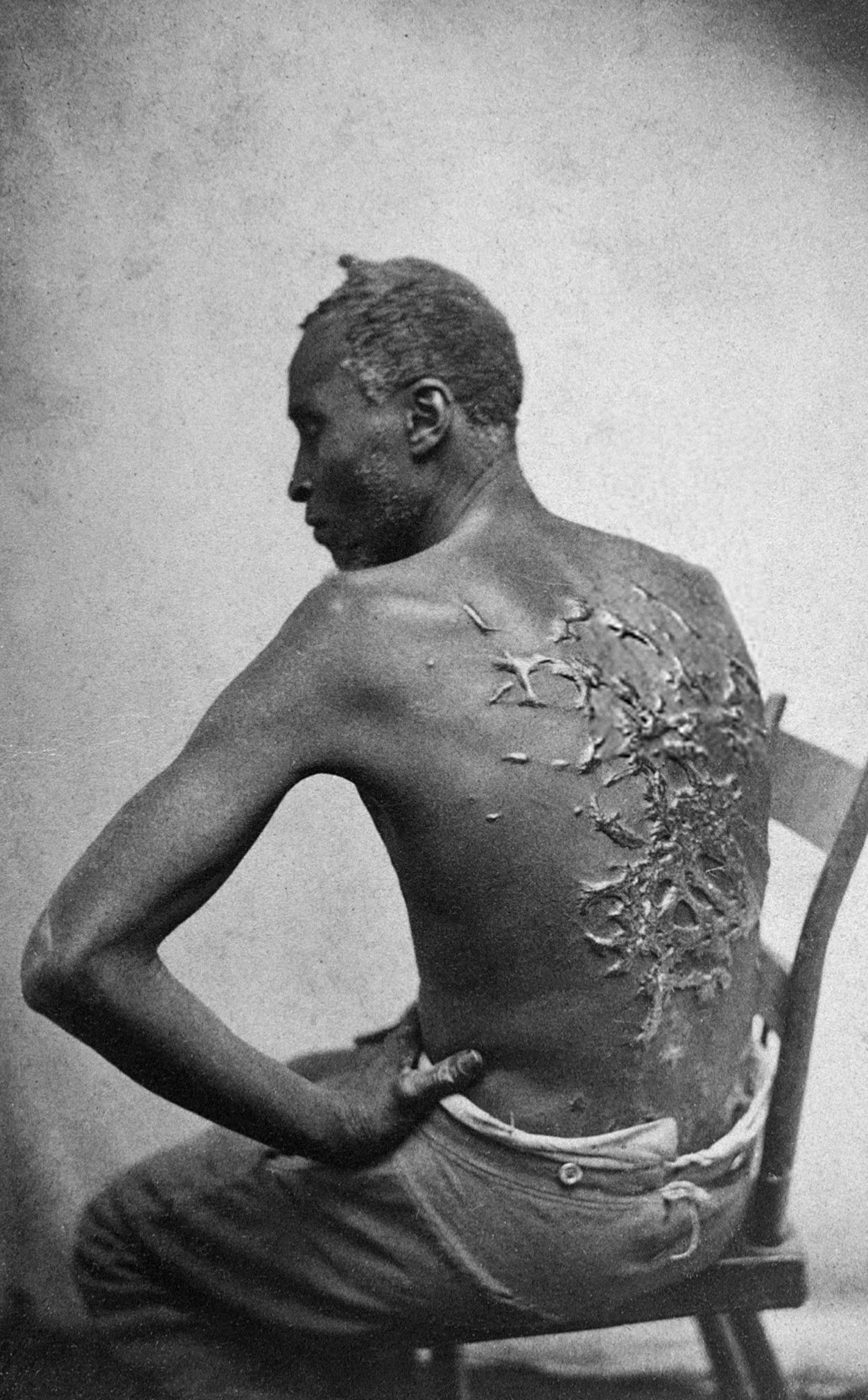
McPherson & Oliver: The Scourged Back (1863), portrait of Gordon

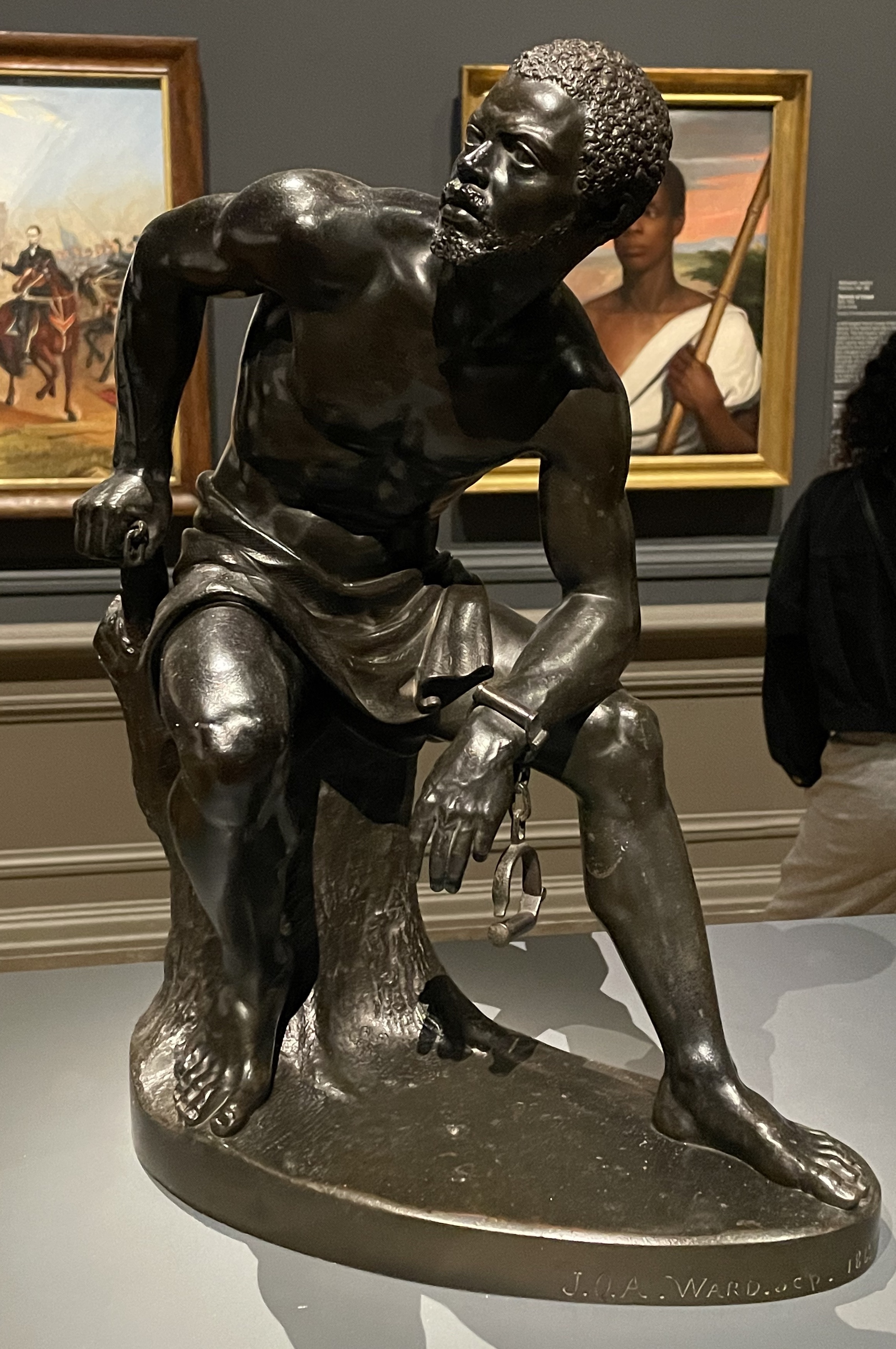
John Quincy Adams Ward: The Freedman (1862-1863)

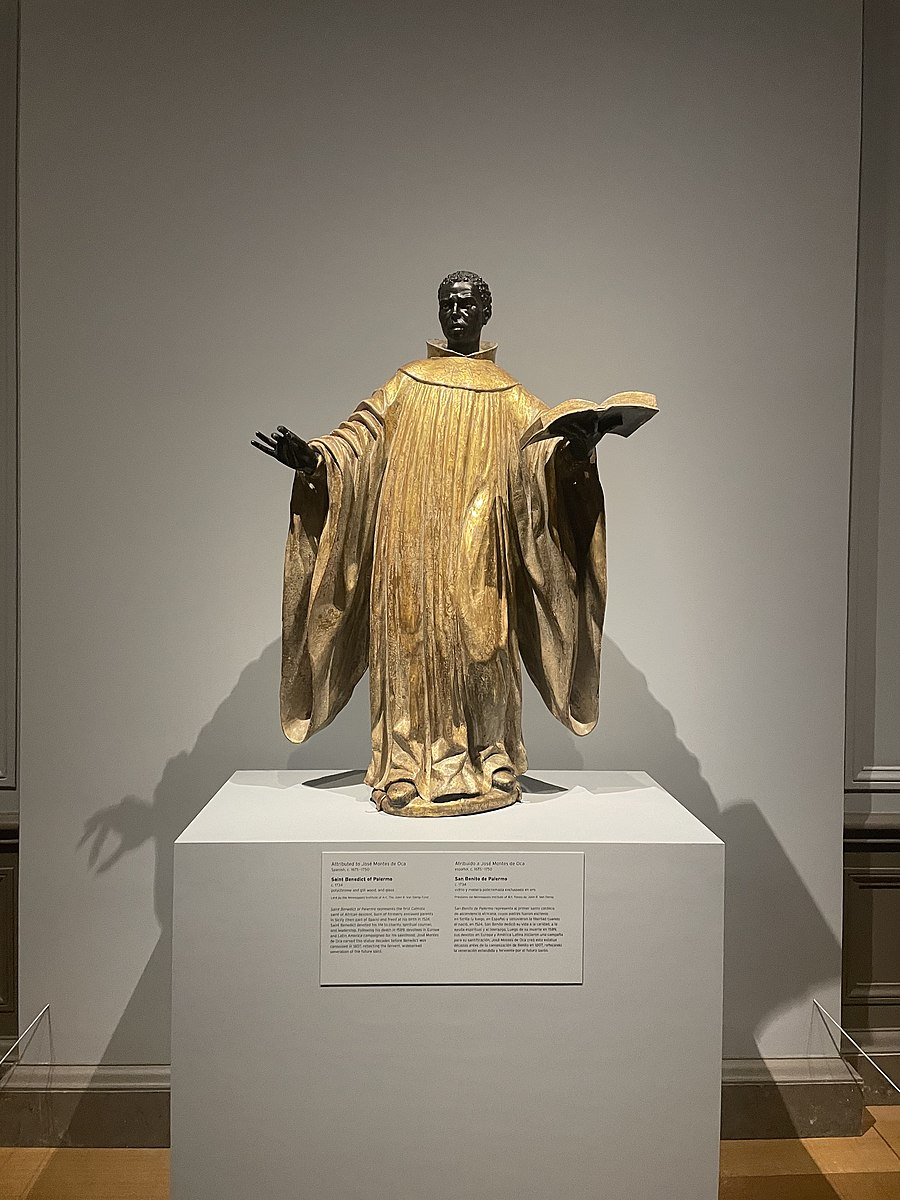
Attributed to José Montes de Oca: Saint Benedict of Palermo (c.1734)
