= Aliza Shvarts =

American artist and writer (born 1986)

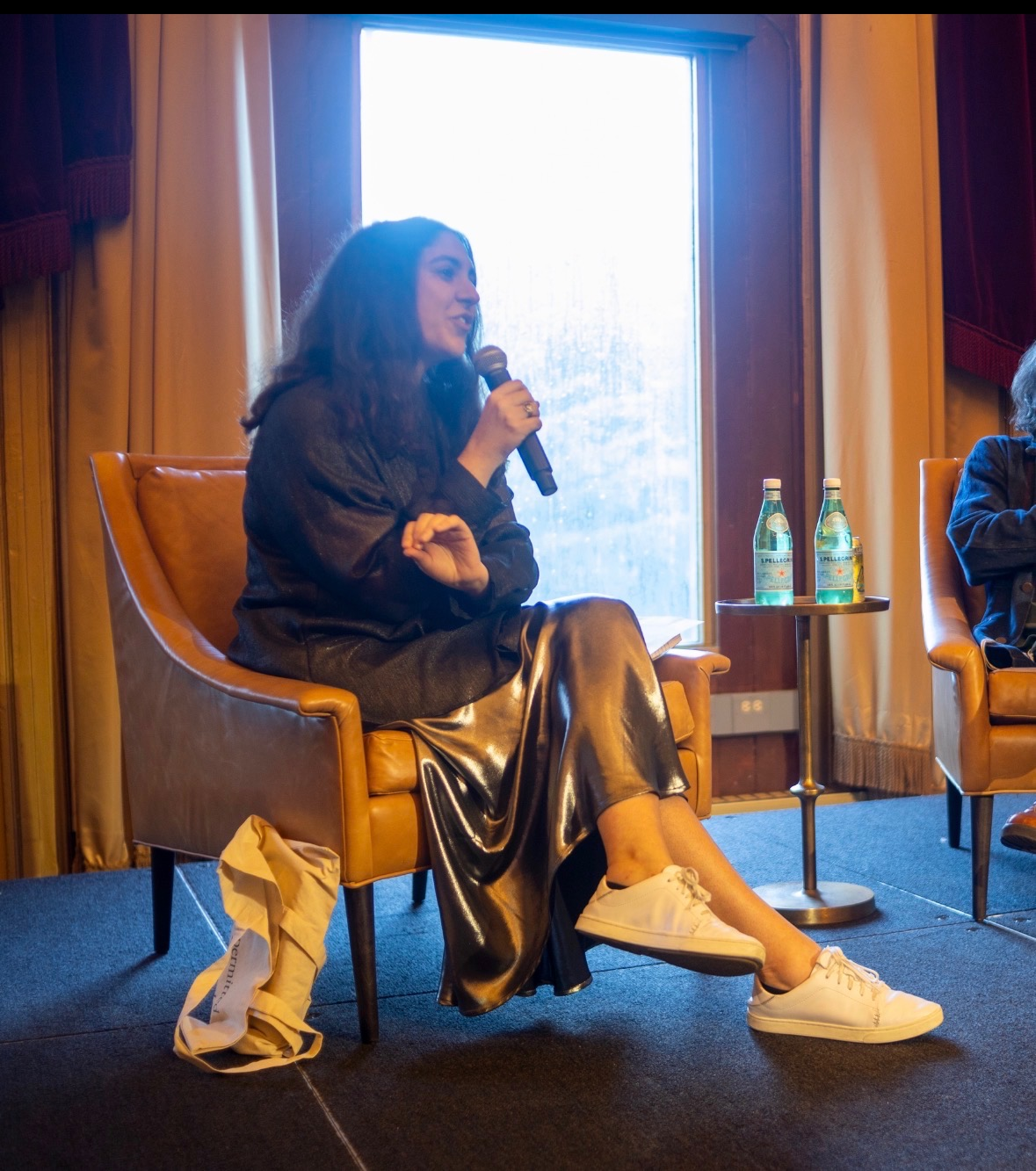
- Shvarts in 2024
- Born: 1986 (age 39–40)
- Education: New York University, Yale University, Whitney Independent Study Program
- Known for: Performance art; queer theory; material feminism
- Awards: Creative Capital Art Writers Award
- Website: alizashvarts.com

Aliza Shvarts (born 1986) is an artist and writer who works in performance, video, and installation. Her art and writing explore queer and feminist understandings of reproduction and duration, and use these themes to affirm abjection, failure, and "decreation". Simone Weil's idea of decreation has been described as "a mystical passage from the created to the uncreated" and "a spiritual exercise of mystical passage: across a threshold, from created to uncreated".

Shvarts' 2008 performance Untitled [Senior Thesis], 2008 generated an international debate. The work explores ideas of fiction and doubt, and engages feminist inquiries into the medical, political, and legal frameworks of gender and reproduction.

Her subsequent works Non-consensual Collaborations (2012–ongoing) and How does it feel to be a fiction (2017) have expanded on such themes as consent, narrative, and doubt. Shvarts holds a BA from Yale University, and a PhD in Performance Studies from New York University.

== Career ==
In the spring of her senior year at Yale, Shvarts's first major work, Untitled [Senior Thesis] (2008), was the center of an international debate around abortion. The piece consisted of a "durational" (crudely translated as "extended time") performance of self-induced miscarriages, and was intensely controversial, with criticism from mass media outlets and both anti-abortion and pro-choice political commentators. Yale claimed that the project was a “creative fiction” and requested that Shvarts submit an alternate thesis project in order to graduate. The work has since been considered an important piece of feminist performance art. Theorist Jennifer Doyle notes that the performance “exposed the investments of a range of institutional systems in [the female] body as both a creative and reproductive system,” and wrote of the media controversy, “the content of the performance has expanded to include nearly all reaction to it.” Art historian Carrie Lambert Beatty writes that the project's “central point [is] that what we take as biological facts are constructed in language and ideology,” noting the different implications of calling Shvarts's bleeding a period, a miscarriage, or an abortion. Shvarts's later artworks made using documentation of Untitled [Senior Thesis] have since been exhibited at Artspace, New Haven and written about in Texte zur Kunst, Mousse, and Artforum.

Shvarts continues to explore ideas surrounding gender, narrative, and truth in her performance Please Come Find Me (2012), in which she invited participants to ask her to do something they thought she'd never done before, as well as Non-consensual Collaborations (2012–ongoing), in which she retroactively designates events and interactions not initially conceived as part of an artistic project as art to explore the gendered dynamics of artistic collaboration. Non-consensual Collaborations has been presented at the Hemispheric Institute of Performance and Politics and The 8th Floor, New York.

In 2017, Shvarts further used digital communication and mass media to engage concepts of “truthiness” and “fake news" in How Does It Feel To Be A Fiction (2017), a viral email performance that explores the various ways in which people are read as fictional along lines of race, class, gender, and sexuality by systems of institutional power. Originally commissioned by Recess’s Critical Writing Fellowship, versions of How Does It Feel To Be A Fiction have been presented at the Universidad de Los Andes, Bogotá, and Artspace, New Haven.

== Publications ==
Shvarts's writing has appeared in TDR: The Drama Review, The Feminist and Queer Information Studies Reader, and The Brooklyn Rail. She is on the advisory board of Women & Performance: a journal of feminist theory, where she has published a number of essays, including “Figuration and Failure, Performance and Pedagogy: Reflections Three Years Later,” which considers what it meant to be known for a piece that had, at the time, never been exhibited publicly. She has given talks and lectures at Artists Space, the Whitney Museum, Harvard University, and Abrons Arts Center, among other institutions. In addition to her artistic and scholarly work, Shvarts has written liner notes for the drone metal band Sunn O)))'s album Kannon and appeared as a guest commentator on MTV.

== Exhibitions ==
Shvarts's work has been the subject of a solo exhibition at Artspace, New Haven, which occurred on the decade anniversary of Untitled [Senior Thesis] (2008) being censored by Yale. She has also exhibited and performed at Abrons Art Center and Lévy Gorvy in New York; the Slought Foundation in Philadelphia; and Performance Space and the Tate Modern in London, among other venues. She frequently designs stage sets for and performs with Carmelita Tropicana, and has collaborated with Vaginal Davis, Emma Sulkowicz, and Critical Practices, Inc.

== Awards and fellowships ==
Shvarts was a 2017 Critical Writing Fellow at Recess, New York and a 2014 recipient of the Creative Capital | Warhol Foundation Arts Writers Grant. She attended the Whitney Independent Study Program as a Helena Rubinstein Fellow in Critical Studies in 2014 to 2015.

== See also ==
- Amalia Ulman
