= Untitled (Senior Thesis) =

2008 student performance art by Aliza Shvarts

Untitled [Senior Thesis] was a work of performance art by Aliza Shvarts which she conducted during 2008, the final year of her visual arts degree at Yale University. During the 9 month performance Shvarts inseminated herself, and on the twenty-eighth day of her menstrual cycle, she took herbal medications meant to induce menses or miscarriage, despite never discovering whether she was actually pregnant or not beforehand. The piece generated controversy at the time, and considerable debate revolved around whether or not the project was a "hoax" or "creative fiction". In subsequent years, scholars and critics have described that uncertainty as a core part of the work itself.

== Creation and performance ==
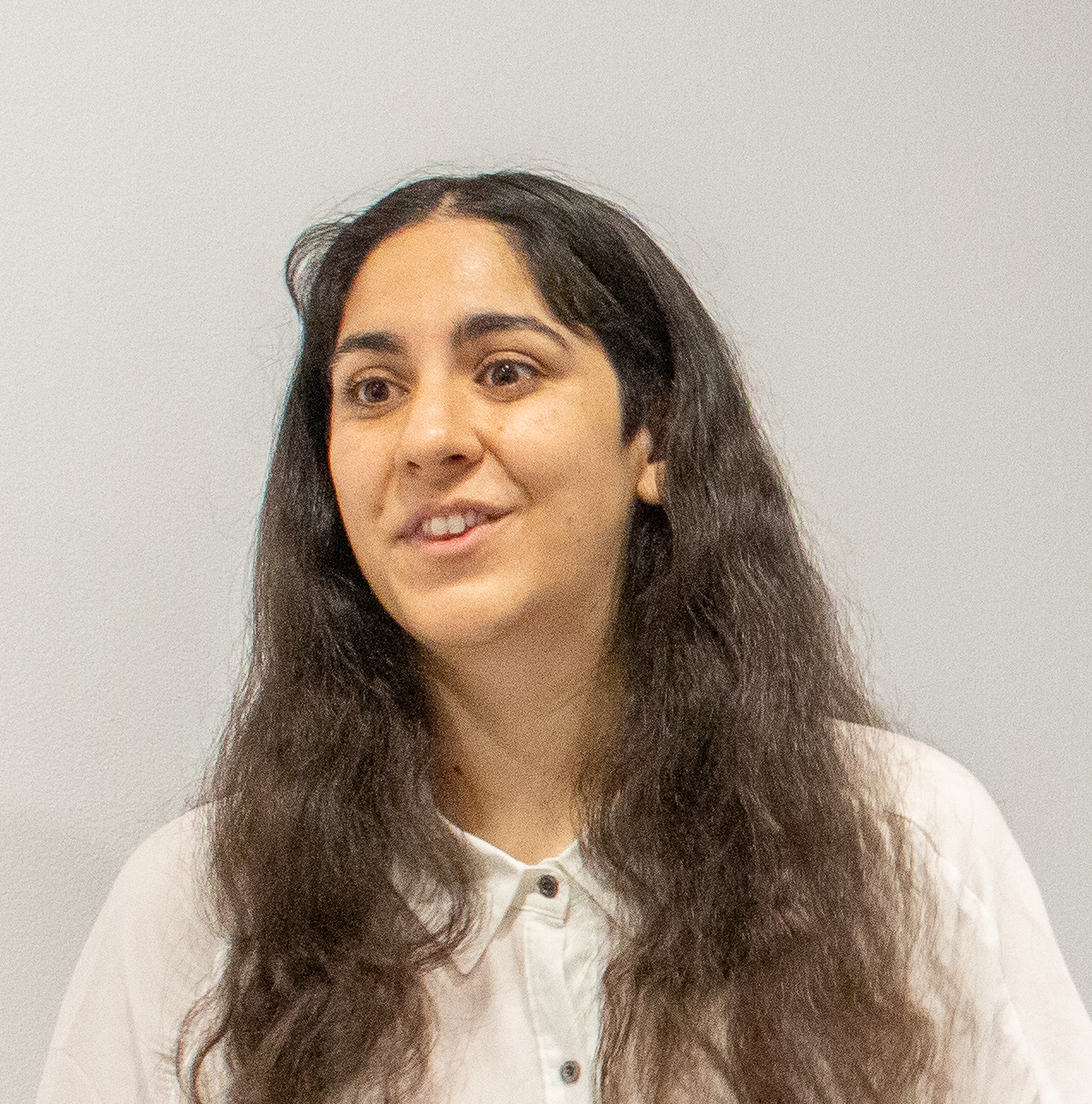
Shvarts in 2019

During the 9 month performance of Untitled [Senior Thesis], Shvarts used donated sperm to inseminate herself as often as possible between the ninth and fifteenth days of her menstrual cycle. On the twenty-eighth day of her cycle, she took herbal medications meant to induce menses or miscarriage (although she never knew if she was pregnant). Shvarts intended to exhibit video of herself experiencing vaginal bleeding on four sides of a clear plastic cube, which would be wrapped with transparent plastic lined with samples of the discharged fluid.

On 17 April 2008, the Yale Daily News printed an article about the end-of-year student exhibition, in which Shvarts stated that the goal of the project was to spark conversation and debate on the relationship between art and the human body, saying: "I believe strongly that art should be a medium for politics and ideologies, not just a commodity. I think that I'm creating a project that lives up to the standard of what art is supposed to be." Gawker and Drudge Report quickly picked up the story, and mainstream media reported on Shvarts's work in the days following. Caught in an international media controversy, Yale College issued a press release claiming that the work was a "creative fiction" including "visual representations, a press release, and other narrative materials." This denial was more about denying any institutional responsibility by Yale, and less about denying the possibility of what Shvarts claims happened. Shvarts maintained the veracity of her performance in a guest article for the Yale Daily News, noting that the ambiguity surrounding the performance was an essential component of the work: “the piece exists only in its telling. This telling can take textual, visual, spatial, temporal, and performative forms—copies of copies of which there is no original … the artwork exists as verbal narrative, […] installation, […] as time-based performance, as an independent concept, as a myth, and as public discourse.”

Robert Storr, dean of Yale's art school, threatened to ban Shvarts from displaying her project unless she confessed in writing that the project had been a fiction and that no human blood had been used. Shvarts refused, and submitted an alternative project as her senior thesis. Yale ultimately admitted that the university “had been unable to determine with clarity whether Ms. Shvarts had in fact undertaken actions injurious to her health in carrying out her original project.”

== Reception ==
In the month after Untitled [Senior Thesis] went viral, the piece created significant internet and media controversy, with many media outlets not seeing the nuances of the work. Some critics placed the work in feminist and art historical context. Feminist political commentator Amanda Marcotte praised Shvarts because she "managed to demonstrate the logic that drives things like blood libels and witch-hunts, where a group believes the impossible because it confirms their irrational hatred for a person they've turned into the Other." Brown University bioethicist Jacob M. Appel wrote in The Washington Post that "the history of great art is one of controversy and outrage" and that Shvarts was "an imaginative and worthy heir to" Manet and Marcel Duchamp. Kriston Capps objected to censorship of the work in the Guardian, noting similarities between Shvarts's work and “other examples of performance art that are recognized as groundbreaking moments in … art history,” such as Vito Acconci and Chris Burden’s work.

Conservative and anti-abortion websites, as well as pro-choice groups and media, were critical of the project, and condemned the university for allowing the work. Ted Miller, a spokesperson for the abortion-rights group NARAL Pro-Choice America called the project "offensive and insensitive to the women who have suffered the heartbreak of miscarriage", and Wanda Franz, the president of the National Right to Life Committee, called the project "depraved."

Since April/May 2008, Untitled [Senior Thesis] has been written about in the context of feminist performance art. Art historian Jennifer Doyle notes that the “project explores the discursive field through which the female body is produced and read as a reproductive body.” Art historian Carrie Lambert Beatty writes that the project's “central point [is] that what we take as biological facts are constructed in language and ideology,” noting the different implications of calling Shvarts's bleeding a “period,” a “miscarriage,” or an “abortion.” The performance has also been written about as an example of the ways in which issues of truth, reality, and fiction are called into question in contemporary mass media. Doyle proposes that “the content of the performance has expanded to include nearly all reaction to it.” Art historian Nikki Cesare Schotzko writes that the “immaterial documentation that accumulated in virtual space” is an essential part of the work. A number of critics have included Untitled [Senior Thesis] in histories of contemporary art about reproductive freedom, including Larayb Abrar, Lisa Gwen Andrews, Sophie Lewis, and Wendy Vogel. Curators Diana Georgiou and Giulia Casalini note that the work is very much in line with "a queerfeminist praxis because it challenges normativity by disavowing the female body of its maternal potential."

== Documentation and exhibition ==
After the work was censored by Yale, Shvarts did not show any visual material from Untitled [Senior Thesis] for 10 years. The performance is only visible through the lens of her recent works that use the documentation as their material. In one series called Banners (2018) Shvarts printed out the entire contents of very long comment threads from 2008 about the work, from theYale Daily News article, or a viral Twitter thread, for example. These very long prints (the longest is over 102 feet long) are hung on the wall or suspended from the ceiling, allowing the heavyweight vinyl to extend onto the floor. In 2018 these works were first exhibited at Shvarts's solo exhibition at Artspace, Off Scene, alongside Player, 2008/2018 a work in which the video documentation was slowed to span the duration of the exhibition, via a custom media player. These works were also exhibited in Purported, a solo exhibition at Art in General, where Player was stretched out to 1632 hours, creating a work that intentionally complicates evidentiary expectations.
