= Daniel Lind-Ramos =

Puerto Rican artist (born 1953)

- Born: 1953 (age 72–73); Loíza, Puerto Rico
- Education: University of Puerto Rico; New York University
- Known for: Sculpture, Painting
- Notable work: Maria Maria, María de los Sustentos, Figura de Poder
- Movement: Afro-Caribbean art, Contemporary art
- Awards: MacArthur Fellowship (2021), Pérez Prize (2020)

Daniel Lind-Ramos (born 1953) is an Afro-Puerto Rican painter and sculptor who lives and works in Puerto Rico.

He was awarded the MacArthur Fellowship in 2021.

== Biography ==
Lind-Ramos was born in 1953 in Loíza, a coastal town in Puerto Rico. He studied painting at the University of Puerto Rico in 1975 and in 1980 he graduated from NYU with a master’s of art degree. In addition to his studio practice, Lind-Ramos also taught in the Humanities Department at the University of Puerto Rico at Humacao.

== Work ==
Figura De Poder (2016-2022) at the National Gallery of Art's exhibition of Afro-Atlantic Histories in 2022

Lind-Ramos paints on canvas with oil using traditional and uncommon applications techniques from brushes to spatulas. He also works with recycled or reused materials such as cardboard, wire screen, discarded appliances, car parts, the foliage of coconut palm trees, broken musical instruments and other used items.

He was described as the "breakout star" or highlight of the 2019 Whitney Biennial by multiple reviewers, with the New York Times writing that his sculpture Maria Maria exemplified the pieces in the Biennial that "reassert the power of spirituality." Critic Holland Cotter elaborated on the sculpture, explaining how Lind-Ramos "creat[ed] from wood, beads, coconuts and a blue FEMA tarp, a figure that is both the Virgin Mary and personification of the hurricane that devastated the island in 2017...the piece looks presidingly majestic."

=== Exhibitions (selection) ===
In 2023, Lind-Ramos presented the solo show “Daniel Lind-Ramos: El Viejo Griot — Una Historia de Todos Nosotros (The Elder Storyteller — A Story of All of Us),” at MoMA PS1, Queens. The exhibition commented on the destruction of Hurricane Maria through large scale installations. About the show, Pulitzer Prize winner and the New York Times co-chief art critic, Holland Cotter stated

The title of a third work, “María de los Sustentos (Mary of Nourishment),” seems to allude to the Mother of Jesus. But the sculptural image Lind-Ramos has come up with feels far less a Spanish Catholic import than a local domestic invention, meticulously assembled, as it is, from pots and pans, fish nets, farming tools, sustaining instruments of daily life in the Loíza community.

In 2022, Lind-Ramos participated in the North American iteration of the international exhibition Afro-Atlantic Histories and his artwork was on view in the display at the National Gallery of Art in Washington D.C.

Lind-Ramos's work was featured in the 35th São Paulo Biennial titled Coreographies of the Impossible, taking place at the São Paulo Biennial Foundation building in the fall of 2023.

== Permanent Collections ==
His works are in the permanent collections of several museum institutions in the United States and abroad such as the Whitney Museum of American Art, the Pérez Art Museum Miami, the Museum of Latin American Art, El Museo del Barrio, and the Puerto Rico Museum of Contemporary Art.

== Exhibitions ==
Some of Lind-Ramos' exhibitions include:

- Fundación Arana Scholarship (1989) – funded Lind-Ramos to study in Paris, France with Antonio Seguí’s Studio at the Ecole des Beaux Arts
- Salon International Val D’or at Hyères (1990) – First Prize
- Salón Internacional de Plástica Latina at Meillant, France (2000) – Delegation Prize
- World Festival of Black Culture and Arts in Dakar, Senegal, Africa (2010) – Invitation
- Second Gran Bienal Tropical (2016) at Piñones, Puerto Rico – Piña de oro
- Whitney Biennial (2019) at the Whitney Museum of American Art in New York, NY – curated by Rujeko Hockley and Jane Panetta

== Awards ==
In 2021, Lind-Ramos was awarded the MacArthur Fellowship.

Lind-Ramos is the recipient of the 2020 Pérez Prize awarded by the Pérez Art Museum Miami. According to the jurors, the award was conceived in honor of the artist's achievements and commitment to Afro-Caribbean and Afro-Latin American identities.
