= Cameron Rowland =

American artist (born 1988)

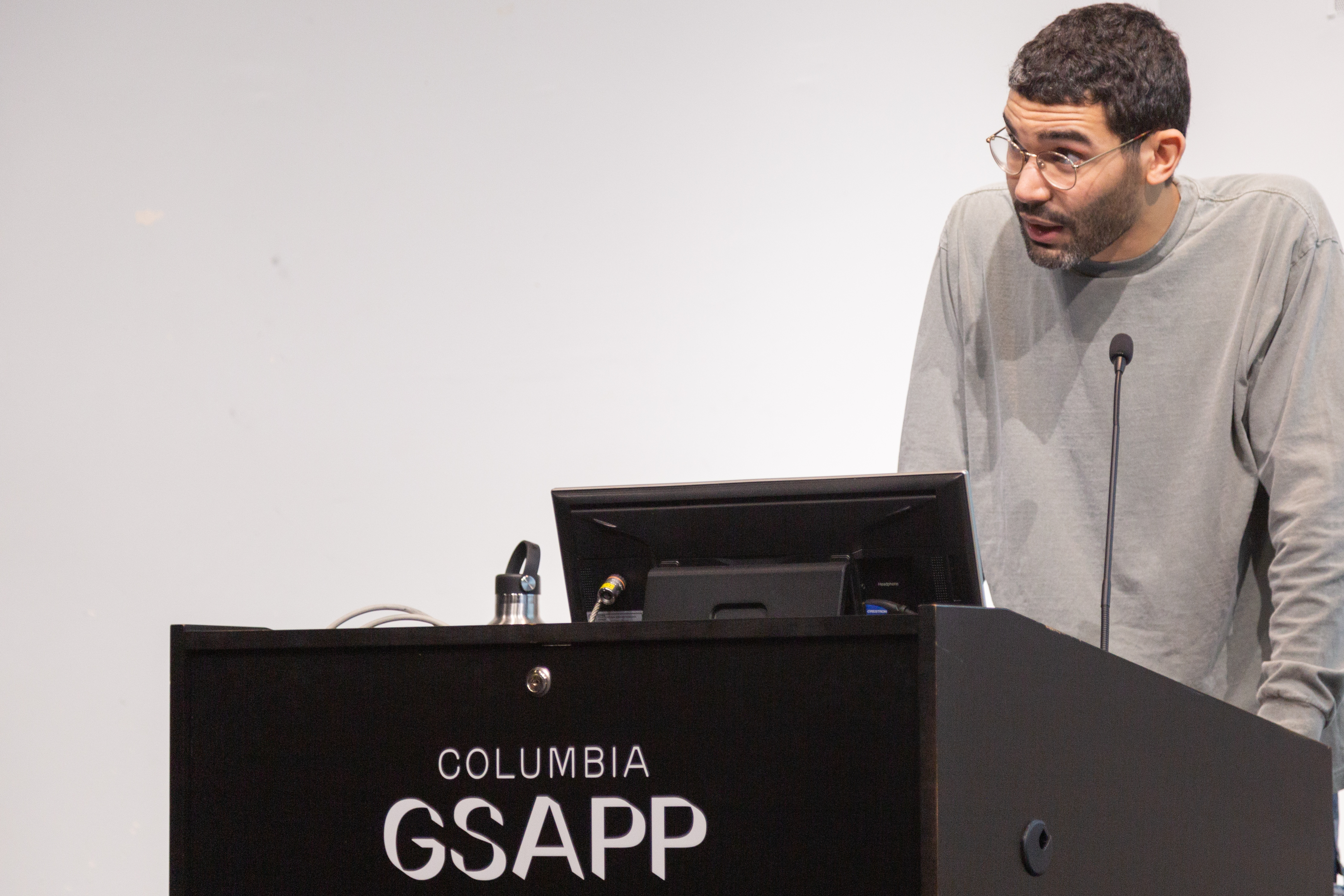
- Rowland speaking at Columbia University in 2020
- Born: 1988 (age 37–38); Philadelphia, Pennsylvania, U.S.
- Education: Wesleyan University (BA)
- Notable work: New York State Unified Court System (2016); Depreciation (2018)
- Style: Conceptual art
- Awards: MacArthur Fellowship

Cameron Rowland (born 1988) is an American conceptual artist whose work has been exhibited internationally and acclaimed for its structural analytic approach to addressing issues of American slavery, mass incarceration, and reparations.

Rowland graduated from Wesleyan University in 2011 and they were awarded the MacArthur Fellowship in 2019 after several solo and group exhibitions at venues including the Museum of Modern Art, Whitney Museum of American Art, Kunsthal Aarhus, and La Biennale de Montreal. Rowland is noted for their distinct method of loaning some works to collectors and institutions rather than selling them outright, an approach meant to mirror the experience of low-income people shopping at rent-to-own stores like Rent-A-Center and disrupt the traditional value structure in the contemporary art market.

== Biography ==
Cameron Rowland was born in Philadelphia, Pennsylvania, in 1988. They became known for their conceptual art addressing social injustice in contemporary society and displaying ready-made objects that are obtained through abstruse economic exchanges. After their exhibitions at Essex Street gallery in 2014 and MoMA PS1’s Greater New York show in 2015, their work gained a wider audience. They spoke at the graduation ceremony of their alma mater Wesleyan University in 2019.

Rowland lives and works in Queens, New York.

== Art practice ==
Rowland's artwork focuses on critiquing systems and institutions that perpetuate or benefit from racial injustices. Many of the objects Rowland uses for their artwork derive from online government auctions and scrap yards, from decommissioned municipal buildings and manufacturers of commercial security apparatuses. These objects are often overlooked by society, but serve a very important purpose in everyday life. For example, one of their works includes manhole leveler rings, which are used to adjust the height of manhole covers when roads are paved. These rings, which few would recognize, are one of the major products manufactured via inmate labor in the New York State prison industry, and are indispensable fixtures of urban infrastructure. Other works of theirs use such objects as wooden desks and wooden benches manufactured by prison labourers for far less than minimum wage. Rowland encourages museums not just to show work about marginalised communities but actually do something about how they live.

Rowland is an example of an artist who is able to place conditions the terms of collection for their work. In some instances, collectors are only allowed to rent, not own, particular works. In a correspondence between the artist, their dealer, and an anonymous collector, published by Parse, Rowland explained that the rental model echoes the experiences of people shopping at stores like Rent-A-Center, where service fees and inflated prices often cost customers much more than if they had been able to purchase the item upfront. The lending model for Rowland represents a restructuring of value in the art market and an examination of the exchange of capital between artists and collectors. Since 2015, Rowland has made about half of their works available in this manner. Rowland's 2019 show at Art Basel in Miami Beach was their first show that solely presented works circulated under this model.

His work Attica Series Desk (2016) consists of an office desk manufactured by incarcerated labourers at Attica Correctional Facility and purchased through the New York state correctional industries catalogue. Frieze named the work No.1 of "The 25 Best Works of the 21st Century", stating that "the work confronts the material traces of systemic inequity and property relations, making visible what is often hidden."

== Major exhibitions ==
=== 91020000 (2016) ===
In 2016, Rowland staged the exhibition 91020000 at Artists Space in New York. The title is derived from Artists Space’s customer account number with Corcraft, a company that manufactures affordable commodities to sell to government agencies, schools, and non-profit organizations, like Artists Space. Rowland purchased four courtroom benches made of oak, a particle board office desk, and seven cast aluminum manhole rings through a partnership with Artists Space. These objects were laid across the presentation space, leaving the viewer to observe without knowing their significance until they pick up the paper accompanying the work which tells them the objects were made by the cheap labor of New York State’s prison inmates. Rowland interprets the prison labor force to be a practiced form of neo-slavery that continues to thrive in our present economy.

In Rowland’s essay explaining the work, they explicate how the 13th Amendment made it possible to incarcerate ex-slaves for vagrancy, allowing private companies and later state governments to exploit prisoners’ free labor. They also explain how a similar tactic was used during the war on drugs in the 1970s, and since then the country has seen a massive rise in incarceration, especially among African Americans.

Rowland approaches their role as an artist to be like an investigative reporter, seeking out intellectual, factual, and material evidence to support their written claims. They also assume the role of active consumer by taking ownership of the objects as a form of antagonism. They reclaim these objects that are markers of corrupt history, stripping the objects of their use-value, and positioning them as relics of structural racism.

A work included in the show is Disgorgement (2016), which is a contractual agreement. Similar to how Rowland used some of D37's budget, they used some of the budget from the show to purchase $10,000 worth of the insurance company Aetna's shares, which held slave insurance policies for slave owners prior to the abolition of slavery, planning to hold onto the shares until the US government makes financial reparations for slavery, at which time the shares will be liquidated toward the payment of reparations.

=== D37 (2018–2019) ===
D37, shown at the Museum of Contemporary Art, Los Angeles (MoCA) in 2018 and 2019, was one of Rowland's largest solo exhibitions. Rowland uses artwork budgets and research to reveal Los Angeles’ role in the violent displacement of the poor and people of color.

Bunker Hill, the site of MoCA, is a historically Mexican and Chinese neighborhood marked area “D37”, hence the name of the exhibition. It was assigned the lowest Security Grade by the Home Owners' Loan Corporation (HOLC) in 1939, and HOLC’s Residential Security Map calls Bunker Hill “a slum area and one of the city’s melting pots”. HOLC changed into the Federal Housing Administration and guided the Los Angeles CRA to attempt to cover up its violence through artificial acts of community service. Rowland focuses on these instances of legally sanctioned racism through D37, unveiling the very mechanisms of a government that makes its own rules to justify its own injustices.

The gallery consisted of carefully selected objects seized by police under civil asset forfeiture that resonate of past ownership. These include used bikes, two leaf blowers, and a one green stroller. Another work, Assessment (2018), which is a late eighteenth-century grandfather clock from Paul Dalton Plantation in South Carolina, stood at the end of the gallery. Also included were property tax receipts on slaves and other owned goods from Mississippi and Virginia that show how these slave states profited and relied on black bodies to build their infrastructure and governments.

Depreciation (2018) at the National Gallery of Art's showing of Afro-Atlantic Histories in 2022

The gallery closed with Depreciation (2018), which consists of a series of legal documents and contracts that show Rowland’s usage of D37’s budget. They used part of the money to acquire one acre of land on Edisto Island, South Carolina to restrict the land and devalue it, and indicates that the current value is $0. They do this because of an empty promise placed on the area in 1865, which stated that slaves would receive forty acres and a mule, which included Edisto Island. The initiative was rescinded in 1866 by President Andrew Johnson. In 2023, the Dia Art Foundation announced it had entered into a long-term loan agreement with Rowland and the nonprofit the artist had created to purchase the land on Edisto Island; Dia agreed to steward the land and showcase the exhibition documents as part of its permanent collection. Unlike the other traditional land art that is in Dia's collection or under Dia's stewardship, the land involved in Depreciation is not accessible to the public, a purposeful choice by the artist to restrict any usage of the land.

== Notable works in public collections ==
- Handpunch (2014–2015), Hessel Museum of Art, Center for Curatorial Studies, Bard College, Annandale-on-Hudson, New York; and Whitney Museum, New York
- Disgorgement (2016), Museum of Modern Art, New York
- Insurance (2016), Museum of Modern Art, New York
- Insurance (2016), Art Institute of Chicago
- National Ex-Slave Mutual Relief, Bounty and Pension Association Badges (2016), Museum of Modern Art, New York
- New York State Unified Court System (2016), Museum of Modern Art, New York (Work rented to museum, at cost)
- Payroll (2016), University of Chicago Booth School of Business Art Collection
- Jim Crow (2017), Carnegie Museum of Art, Pittsburgh
- 2015 MOCA REAL ESTATE ACQUISITION (2018), Museum of Contemporary Art, Los Angeles
- Assessment (2018), Tate, London
- Depreciation (2018), stewarded by Dia Art Foundation, Beacon, New York
- Group of 11 Used Bikes - Item: 0281-007089 (2018), Museum für Moderne Kunst, Frankfurt, Germany (Work rented to museum, at cost)
- Stihl Backpack Blower - Item: 0514-005983 (2018), Museum für Moderne Kunst, Frankfurt, Germany (Work rented to museum, at cost)
- probability of escape (2020), Institute of Contemporary Art, Miami
- Lynch Law in America (2021), Art Institute of Chicago

== Awards ==
Rowland was chosen as a MacArthur Fellow in 2019.

== Exhibitions ==
Rowland has staged a number of solo shows at galleries and museums, including Bait, Inc. (2014), Maxwell Graham Gallery, New York; 91020000 (2016), Artists Space, New York; Birmingham (2017) Galerie Buchholz, Cologne; D37 (2018), Museum of Contemporary Art, Los Angeles; 3 & 4 Will. IV c.73 (2020), Institute of Contemporary Arts, London; and Amt 45 i (2023), Museum für Moderne Kunst, Frankfurt.

Rowland has also participated in a large number of group exhibitions, including La Biennale de Montreal (2016); Whitney Biennial (2017); São Paulo Art Biennial (2018); and Afro-Atlantic Histories (2021-2023).
