= Nona Faustine =

American photographer and visual artist (1977–2025)

- Born: 1977; New York City, U.S.
- Died: March 20, 2025 (aged 48)
- Education: School of Visual Arts; International Center of Photography at Bard College
- Children: 1

Nona Faustine (1977 – March 20, 2025) was an American photographer and visual artist. Her work focused on history, identity, representation, and what it means to be a woman in the 21st century. Her artwork is in the collection of the Brooklyn Museum and the Carnegie Museum.

== Early life and education ==
Nona Faustine was born in 1977 in Brooklyn, New York, and raised in Crown Heights. Her parents came to the city from North Carolina. Faustine was introduced to photography as a child. Her father and uncle were amateur photographers, and Faustine's first camera was a gift from her uncle.

Faustine was initially inspired to become a photographer by a series of Time Life books. She was influenced by Diane Arbus, Richard Avedon, and photojournalist Ernst Haas. However, at a young age Faustine struggled to find herself in the histories of photography she encountered, which focused on photographers who were disproportionately male and white.

She graduated with a B.F.A. degree in photography from the School of Visual Arts in New York City in 1997, and an M.F.A. degree in 2013 from the International Center of Photography at Bard College.

== Career ==
As an undergraduate, Faustine worked primarily in documentary photography. She shot one series, "Young Mothers", of young women she knew through her family, friends, and her neighborhood. She also had an interest in landscape photography, which she later utilized in "White Shoes". As an MFA student, Faustine began to move away from the traditional documentary model, saying in 2016, "It just didn't work for me anymore. I wanted more room to play with communication. Conceptual works appealed to me". Faustine's work also looked at broader questions of American history, as in a photo series that placed national landmarks (such as the Lincoln Memorial and the Statue of Liberty) behind bars. Faustine's work focused primarily on the experiences of Black women, often through the medium of self-portraitry. For example, her 2016 portrait Say Her Name, photographed in her family's apartment in Flatbush, was created as a tribute to Sandra Bland, a Black woman who died in police custody in 2015.

=== Mitochondria (begun 2008) ===
In the series "Mitochondria", a reference to mitochondrial DNA, which is fully inherited from the mother, Faustine photographed herself, her mother, her sister, and her daughter in their shared home in Brooklyn, NY. The work illuminates both the strength of their familial bond and their interdependent destinies. The New York Times observed that the series is "a celebration of the power of African American women to nurture family, even in the direst circumstances. The series’ title refers to the mitochondrial DNA ... Through this scientific metaphor, the series commemorates the continuity of African American womanhood from one generation to another ... The series also underscores the role played by women of color in the struggle for equality and justice. Historically, African American women were marginalized within mainstream feminism. Nevertheless, they were able to turn to and embolden each other in the face of prejudice, even before the advent of the modern feminist movement".

=== My Country (2016) ===
My Country was Faustine's first solo exhibition, held at Baxter St. Camera Club of New York from December 8, 2016, to January 14, 2017. The exhibition presented works from the White Shoes series, as well as a series of photographs of monuments. The monuments, including the Statue of Liberty and The Lincoln Memorial, are pictured with a black line slicing through the image. The Village Voice wrote that her work was "a frank rendering of America's disgraceful and all-too-buried legacy of marginalization" and explained the impact of the monument photographs: "the graphic interruption stands for the scores of mistreated Americans for whom such structures and their supposed representation of the common good have remained inaccessible".

=== White Shoes (2012–2021) ===
From Her Body Sprang Their Greatest Wealth (2013), from the series White Shoes, at the National Gallery of Art's showing of Afro-Atlantic Histories in Washington, DC in 2022

The White Shoes series portrays the history of slavery in New York through a series of nude self-portraits taken in former locations significant to the slave trade. The series also engages with representation of the black female body. Faustine first had the idea for the series in 1991, during the excavation of the African Burial Ground in Manhattan. She began to work on "White Shoes" as a graduate student. Influenced by Lorna Simpson and Carrie Mae Weems, Faustine began the series as her thesis project in 2012 and continued to add to it over the subsequent three years. This work is based on Faustine's research on the history of slavery in the five boroughs of New York City, including slave burial grounds, slave markets, slave owning farms, and the landing spots of slave ships. Standing in white shoes, she reminds viewers how often African-Americans must adopt white culture. Posing on a wooden box at locations around New York where slaves were once sold, "baring her flesh to history, she conveys the most fundamental horror of the slave trade, the way it reduced people to mere bodies, machines of muscle."

Her 2016 exhibition at Smack Mellon was reviewed extensively. The New Yorker's Alexandra Schwartz wrote, "Faustine's photos serve to mark the places that belong to a history too often hidden from view, whether by design, or neglect, or the ever-frenetic pace of change inherent to life in New York." In 2024, the series was exhibited at the Brooklyn Museum.

== Personal life and death ==
Faustine was a single mother to one daughter, born in the late 2000s. According to the DNA-testing company African Ancestry, Faustine found she had Bubi, Hausa, Fulani, and Tikar heritage from her mother's side, and Mandinka and Nigerian Yoruba heritage on her father's side. Faustine died on March 20, 2025, at the age of 48.

== Exhibitions ==
=== Solo exhibitions ===
- My Country, Baxter St. Camera Club (2016–2017)
- Making Them Known: Nona Faustine, Artspace, New Haven, CT, 2017
- Mitochondria, Higher Pictures, Brooklyn, New York, 2021
- White Shoes, Brooklyn Museum, New York, 2024

=== Group exhibitions ===
- The Outwin American Portraiture Today, 2019, National Portrait Gallery, Washington, DC
- Perilous Bodies, Ford Foundation, NY, 2019
- Slavery in the Hands of Harvard, Harvard University, 2019
- Refraction: New Photography of Africa and Its Diaspora, Steven Kasher Gallery, 2018
- MAMI, Knockdown Center, Maspeth, NY 2016
- Race&Revolution, Governors Island, NY 2016
- The Future Is Forever, International Center of Photography, Mana Contemporary Art Center Jersey City, NJ 2015

== Awards ==
- 2024: Rome Prize in visual art from the American Academy in Rome
- 2019: Anonymous Was a Woman Award
- 2019: Colene Brown Art Prize, BRIC

== Collections ==
- National Gallery of Art, Washington, D.C., United States
- Brooklyn Museum, Brooklyn, New York, United States
