= LG Guggenheim Award =

International art award

- Awarded for: Innovation in technology-based art
- Sponsored by: LG Corporation
- Venue: Guggenheim New York
- Presented by: Solomon R. Guggenheim Foundation
- Reward: $100,000
- Established: 2022
- Website: https://www.guggenheim.org/initiatives/lg-guggenheim-art-and-technology-initiative, https://lgartssponsorship.lg.co.kr/en/

The LG Guggenheim Award is an annual international art prize established in 2022 through a five-year partnership between LG and the Solomon R. Guggenheim Museum. The award is component of the LG Guggenheim Art and Technology Initiative, with focuses on artists working with technology.

The award is presented annually to one artist for work in technology-based art. The recipient is selected by an international jury of curators, museum directors, and art professionals, and receives an unrestricted honorarium of $100,000.

As part of the initiative, the Solomon R. Guggenheim Museum established a dedicated curatorial position, the LG Electronics Associate Curator, which focuses on research and exhibitions related to technology-based art.

Award recipients include Stephanie Dinkins (2023), Shu Lea Cheang (2024), Ayoung Kim (2025), and Trevor Paglen (2026).

== Background ==
The award is one of the three pillars of the LG Guggenheim Art and Technology Initiative. The initiative was launched on June 1, 2022, as a five-year partnership between the Solomon R. Guggenheim Foundation and LG. The collaboration was designed to research, honor, and promote artists working in the field of technology-based art.

- LG Guggenheim Award: An annual prize supported by LG Corporation that recognizes an artist working in technology-based art. The recipient is selected by an international jury and receives an unrestricted honorarium of $100,000.
- LG Electronics Associate Curator: A dedicated curatorial position at the Guggenheim New York funded by LG Electronics. The role focuses on research, acquisition, and exhibitions of digital art forms, including artificial intelligence, augmented reality, virtual reality, and non-fungible tokens.
- Young Collectors Council(YCC) Party: An annual fundraising event sponsored by LG Electronics. The event incorporates digital installations by young artists and utilizes electronic technologies to showcase contemporary artwork.

Regarding the goals of the partnership, Naomi Beckwith, the museum's Deputy Director and Chief Curator, noted that the initiative aims to support artists who examine how technology shapes society. Seol Park, Head of Brand Management at LG Corp., stated that the collaboration intends to provide the creative community with access to new technological tools, exploring technology as a medium for artistic expression.

== Recipients ==
=== 2023 ===
The inaugural 2023 LG Guggenheim Award was presented to Stephanie Dinkins, a Brooklyn-based artist and educator. Her work utilizes technologies such as artificial intelligence (AI) and augmented reality (AR). Among her notable works is BINA48, where she engaged in long-term conversations with a social robot to explore the intersection of race, gender, and artificial intelligence, as well as Not the Only One (N'TOO), a deep-learning AI trained on the oral history of a multi-generational Black American family.

The international jury selected Dinkins for her focus on ethics and social equity within artificial intelligence. The panel noted that her collaborative approach to machine learning advocates for transparency and accessibility in AI technologies, particularly for vulnerable communities.

The 2023 international jury panel consisted of:

- Legacy Russell, Executive director and Chief Curator, The Kitchen, New York
- Tina Rivers Ryan, Curator, Buffalo AKG Art Museum, New York
- Nat Trotman, Curator, Performance and Media, Solomon R. Guggenheim Museum, New York
- Xiaoyu Weng, independent curator and writer; and Anicka Yi, artist

Naomi Beckwith, Chief Curator at the Guggenheim, noted that Dinkins's engagement with socio-cultural values and artificial intelligence reflects the trajectory of technology-based art. Seol Park of LG Corp. added that the award's physical design is intended to represent technology's potential to inspire new artistic forms.

Stephanie Dinkins was honored at the 2023 Young Collectors Council(YCC) Party held at the Solomon R. Guggenheim Museum.

=== 2024 ===
The 2024 LG Guggenheim Award was awarded to Shu Lea Cheang, a Taiwanese-American artist working in Net art, virtual reality, and software design. Her practice addresses social and political themes, including gender and digital economies, through the use of digital technologies. Among her notable works are Brandon (1998–1999), the first web-based artwork commissioned by the Guggenheim Museum, and 3x3x6, an installation exploring digital surveillance and gender narratives presented at the Taiwan Pavilion during the 2019 Venice Biennale.

The international jury recognized Cheang for her exploration of the boundaries between physical and digital spaces. The panel highlighted how her interactive works encourage audience engagement with these intersecting domains.

The 2024 international jury panel consisted of:

- Eungie Joo, Curator and Head of Contemporary Art at San Francisco Museum of Modern Art
- Koyo Kouoh, executive director and Chief Curator of Zeitz Museum of Contemporary Art, Cape Town
- Noam Segal, LG Electronics Associate Curator, Solomon R. Guggenheim Museum, New York
- Carolyn Christov-Bakargiev, Director of Castello di Rivoli Museo d'Arte Contemporanea, Turin
- Stephanie Dinkins, artist and the inaugural recipient of the LG Guggenheim Award

Naomi Beckwith stated that Cheang's early work recognized the potential of the digital realm, focusing on the intersection of bodies and desires in both digital and analog contexts. Seol Park of LG Corp. noted that Cheang's artistic inquiry has long anticipated contemporary technological discourses, such as data, decentralized networks, and gamification.

Cheang was honored as the recipient at the 2024 YCC Party at the Solomon R. Guggenheim Museum.

=== 2025 ===
The 2025 LG Guggenheim Award was presented to Ayoung Kim, a South Korean visual and media artist. Her practice integrates emerging technologies—including virtual reality(VR), game engines, live simulation, and LiDAR scanning—with traditional mediums such as sculpture, printmaking, and performance. She is the first South Korean artist to receive the LG Guggenheim Award.Notable works include the Porosity Valley series (2017–2019), which examines the migration of mineral resources and data, and Delivery Dancer’s Sphere (2022), a video game-style exploration of algorithm-driven delivery platform labor.

The jury selected Kim for her integration of traditional art forms with emerging technologies, such as virtual environments and game engines. The panel noted her ability to synthesize these diverse methods into cohesive installations.

The 2025 international jury panel consisted of:

- Mohamed Almusibli, Director and Chief Curator, Kunsthalle Basel
- Doryun Chong, artistic director and Chief Curator, M+, Hong Kong
- Sabine Himmelsbach, Director, HEK (House of Electronic Arts), Basel
- Alfredo Jaar, artist, architect and filmmaker
- Noam Segal, LG Electronics Associate Curator, Solomon R. Guggenheim Museum, New York

Naomi Beckwith stated that Kim's practice explores questions regarding time and human experience in the digital age, highlighting the convergence of machines and humanity. Seol Park of LG Corp. noted that Kim utilizes technology as both a subject matter and a medium to examine the relationship between human emotions and technological advancements.

Kim was honored at the 2025 YCC Party held at the Solomon R. Guggenheim Museum.

=== 2026 ===
The 2026 LG Guggenheim Award was presented to Trevor Paglen, an American geographer and media artist whose practice incorporates photography, sculpture, and engineering. His work examines contemporary technology, surveillance, and data infrastructure. His notable projects include ImageNet Roulette (2019), a collaboration with researcher Kate Crawford that examined the biases of AI facial recognition, and Orbital Reflector (2018), a purely artistic satellite launched into low Earth orbit.

The international jury recognized Paglen for his focus on addressing global concerns through artistic research and technology. The panel emphasized that his practice makes opaque technologies more accessible to the public while highlighting their broader societal and ethical implications.

The 2026 international jury panel consisted of:

- Mami Kataoka, Director, Mori Art Museum
- Melanie Lenz, Curator of Digital Art, Victoria and Albert Museum, London
- Rasha Salti, researcher, writer, and curator of art and film, and curatorial advisor to late Koyo Kouoh, Artistic Director of the 61st Venice Biennale
- Noam Segal, Ph.D., LG Electronics Associate Curator, Guggenheim New York
- Eugenio Viola, Ph.D., Artistic Director, Bogotá Museum of Modern Art

Naomi Beckwith stated that Paglen's work allows audiences to perceive unseen technological forces and envision alternative applications. Seol Park of LG Corp. noted that his practice highlights the importance of transparency and human-centered approaches in technological advancement.

Paglen was honored at the 2026 YCC Party held at the Solomon R. Guggenheim Museum.

== Award Trophy ==
The physical trophy is presented to the annual award recipient along with the $100,000 honorarium. The trophy's design utilizes a sculptural motif inspired by binary code digits("1" and "0"). In 2023, the award's design received an iF Design Award in the Products category.

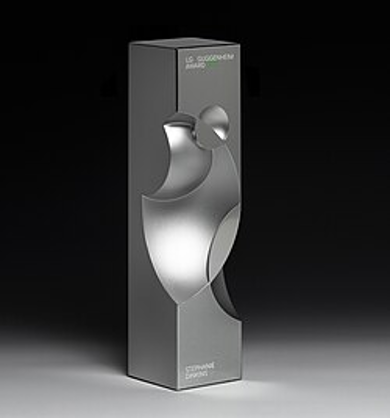
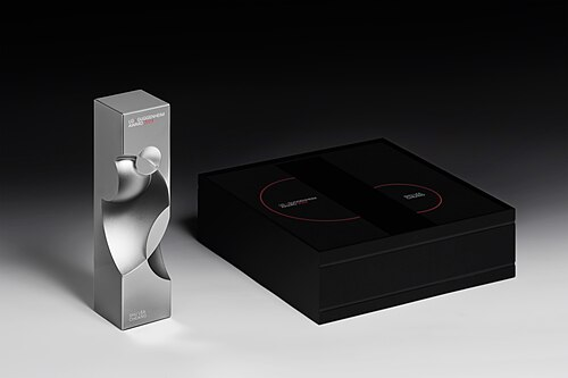
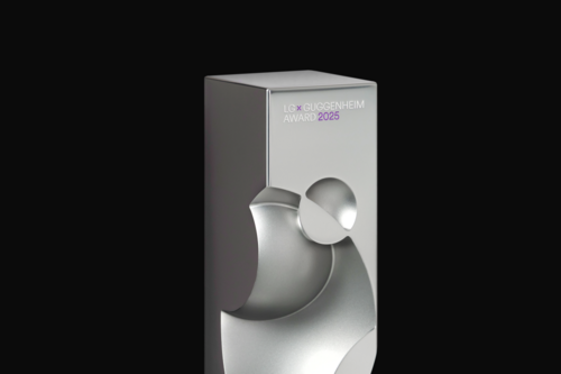

== Visual Identity ==
The visual identity of the LG Guggenheim Award incorporates mathematical symbols as primary design elements. The multiplication sign (×) signifies the collaboration between the two institutions, while the addition sign (+) represents the intersection of art and technology.

== Associated Programs ==
=== Curatorial Research ===
In March 2023, the position of LG Electronics Associate Curator was established at the Solomon R. Guggenheim Museum to support research in digital and technology-based art. Noam Segal was appointed to this role, focusing her efforts on curating exhibitions and public programs that utilize technology, supporting the discovery of emerging artists, and serving as a jury member for the annual LG Guggenheim Award.

Segal has curated and produced public programs for the award recipients, including exhibitions and performance lectures at the Guggenheim New York featuring artists such as Stephanie Dinkins(2024), Shu Lea Cheang(2024), Ayoung Kim(2025), and Trevor Paglen(2026).

=== Public Programs ===
2023: Late Shift x Stephanie Dinkins

On January 25, 2024, inaugural award recipient Stephanie Dinkins presented a public program titled "Late Shift x Stephanie Dinkins" at the Guggenheim New York. The event featured the debut of three works in progress—The Stories We Tell Our Machines, WisdomBot (2023), and Not the Only One Avatar Image 2023 Brain (N'TOO)—utilizing OLED display technologies to explore digital consciousness within the museum's rotunda.

2024: What The Heck

On May 2, 2024, 2024 recipient Shu Lea Cheang delivered a performance lecture titled "What the Heck: Shu Lea Cheang on Hacking Tactics, Virus Becoming, and Geek Farming" at the Peter B. Lewis Theater. The presentation explored hacking tactics and viral metaphors, followed by a conversation with Noam Segal, LG Electronics Associate Curator.

2025: The Soft Geometry of Being

On July 1, 2025, 2025 recipient Ayoung Kim presented a performance lecture titled "The Soft Geometry of Being: An Evening with LG Guggenheim Award Recipient Ayoung Kim" at the Peter B. Lewis Theater. The program featured a showcase of her Delivery Dancer series on LG OLED evo screens and a discussion moderated by Noam Segal.

==== 2026: The Lizard People Are Here! ====
In May 2026, 2026 recipient Trevor Paglen delivered a performance lecture titled "The Lizard People Are Here!" at the Solomon R. Guggenheim Museum, accompanied by a conversation with Noam Segal.

=== Emerging Artist collaborations and YCC Party ===
Each year, as part of the LG Guggenheim Art and Technology Initiative, the Solomon R. Guggenheim Museum selects an emerging artist to create a site-specific installation for the annual Young Collectors Council (YCC) Party, presented by LG Electronics. This collaboration enables artists to incorporate advanced display technologies—such as OLED TVs and transparent OLED panels—into their creative practice within the museum's architectural space.

==== 2023: Farah Al Qasimi ====
For the 2023 YCC Party, artist and musician Farah Al Qasimi presented "Artificial Digital Paradise," an installation incorporating LG Display's Transparent OLED and LG Electronics' OLED displays to examine the relationship between physical space and digital imagery.

==== 2024: Rachel Rossin ====
Media artist Rachel Rossin designed the site-specific installation for the 2024 YCC Party under the concept "Quickening," utilizing Transparent OLED from LG Display and OLED screens from LG Electronics to explore themes of technological acceleration.

==== 2025: LaJuné McMillian ====
Artist and creative technologist LaJuné McMillian created the installation for the 2025 YCC Party titled "Motion Witnessing," incorporating LG Electronics' OLED display technology and motion capture within the Guggenheim rotunda to address digital representation and physical movement.

==== 2026: Diane Severin Nguyen ====
For the 2026 YCC Party, artist and filmmaker Diane Severin Nguyen was selected as the collaborating artist. Her site-specific installation incorporated LG Electronics' OLED display technology within the Guggenheim rotunda, addressing themes of digital imagery, atmosphere, and material forms.

== See Also ==
=== Official Website ===
- LG Guggenheim Art and Technology Initiative
- LG Guggenheim Award

=== LG Guggenheim Award recipient profile video ===
- 2023 Stephanie Dinkins
- 2024 Shu Lea Cheang
- 2025 Ayoung Kim

=== Emerging artist profile video ===
- 2023 Farah Al Qasami
- 2024 Rachel Rossin
- 2025 LaJuné McMillian
- 2026 Diane Severin Nguyen
