= Xiaoyu Weng =

Chinese curator and writer

- 翁笑雨
- Born: Shanghai, China
- Occupations: Curator; writer; educator

Xiaoyu Weng (翁笑雨) is a Shanghai-born, New York-based curator, writer, and educator in the area of contemporary art. Her curatorial practice is interested in the impact of globalization and emerging ecological and environmental transformations, among other themes.

== Early life and education ==
Born in Shanghai, Xiaoyu Weng holds a BA in art history from the Central Academy of Fine Arts in Beijing and an MA in curatorial practice from the California College of the Arts in San Francisco.

== Career ==
Weng was the inaugural curatorial fellow at Wattis Institute for Contemporary Arts at the California College of the Arts and a program director of the Asian Contemporary Art Consortium in San Francisco.

=== Kadist Art Foundation, 2010–2015 ===
In 2010, Weng was appointed founding director of the Kadist Art Foundation's Asia Programmes for Paris and San Francisco, where she oversaw artist residencies, built the contemporary Asian art collection, and launched the Kadist Curatorial Collaboration, which organizes exhibitions designed to encourage cultural exchange. She organized shows like Ho Tzu Nyen: The Cloud of Unknowing (2011), Ming Wong: Making Chinatown (2012), Young Hae Chang Heavy Industries: Pacific Limm (2013), and Robert Zhao Renhui: Flies Prefer Yellow (2014). Weng has said that working at the Kadist developed her interest in artistic practice and culture in Southeast Asia, particularly in Singapore.

She was also a co-curator of the exhibition Landscape: the virtual, the actual, the possible? for the Guangdong Times Museum in Guangzhou and the Yerba Buena Center for the Arts in San Francisco in 2014.

=== Solomon R. Guggenheim Museum, 2015–2021 ===
In 2015, Weng was appointed the Robert H.N. Ho Family Foundation Associate Curator at the Solomon R. Guggenheim Museum, New York, where she curated the exhibitions Tales of Our Time (2016), which commissioned new works by nine artists born in mainland China, Hong Kong, or Taiwan; and One Hand Clapping (2018), featuring newly commissioned artworks by five artists and artist collectives from artists born in Greater China, including Cao Fei and Samson Young.

In 2015, Weng curated Soft Crash, an homage to J. G. Ballard, held at the Galleria d'Arte Moderna e Contemporanea in Bergamo, Italy. From 2018 to 2019, she served as the curator of the 5th Ural Industrial Biennial of Contemporary Art held in Yekaterinburg, Russia, transforming a former military factory and an abandoned theater into contemporary art spaces. In 2019, she curated Neither Black / Red / Yellow Nor Woman, held at the Times Art Center Berlin, Germany, and in 2021 curated Miriam Cahn and Claudia Martínez Garay: Ten Thousand Things, held at the Sifang Art Museum, Nanjing, China.

=== Art Gallery of Ontario, 2021–2023 ===
In March 2021, Weng began an appointment to the Art Gallery of Ontario in Toronto as the lead curator and head of modern and contemporary art. That April her last project at the Guggenheim, Christian Nyampeta: Sometimes It Was Beautiful, opened in the rotunda of the Museum, involving film, audio, videos, and drawings. Weng remained in the position for two years, an unusually short period for the position.

=== Documenta 16 ===
In 2025, Naomi Beckwith appointed Weng to her artistic team for the 2027 edition of documenta alongside Carla Acevedo‑Yates, Romi Crawford, and Mayra A. Rodríguez Castro.

== Other activities ==
Weng has taught at New York University, Bard College, and the School of Visual Arts.

Weng was part of the jury that selected Stephanie Dinkins for the 2023 LG Guggenheim Award, which recognizes technology-based artists.

== Publications ==
Weng has contributed essays on contemporary art for books such as Six Lines of Flight: Shifting Geographies in Contemporary Art, published in association with University of California Press on the occasion of the exhibition of the same name held at the San Francisco Museum of Modern Art (2012). She has also written for numerous periodicals, among them Artforum, and is the co-editor of catalogues such as Tales of Our Time (2016) and One Hand Clapping (2018). She is a guest editor of Heichi Magazine, a bilingual digital forum for visual culture exchange in the Chinese-speaking world and internationally.

== Honors ==
- Asian Cultural Council grant (2008)
- Artforum Critical Writing Award for "Working with Archive" (2011)
- Premio Lorenzo Bonald from L’Arte Enterprize (2015)
- Visionary Award from Art in General (2017)
- Exhibition of the Year Award from The Art Newspaper for the 5th Ural Industrial Biennial of Contemporary Art (2019)
