= Abdul Alkalimat =

American professor (born 1942)

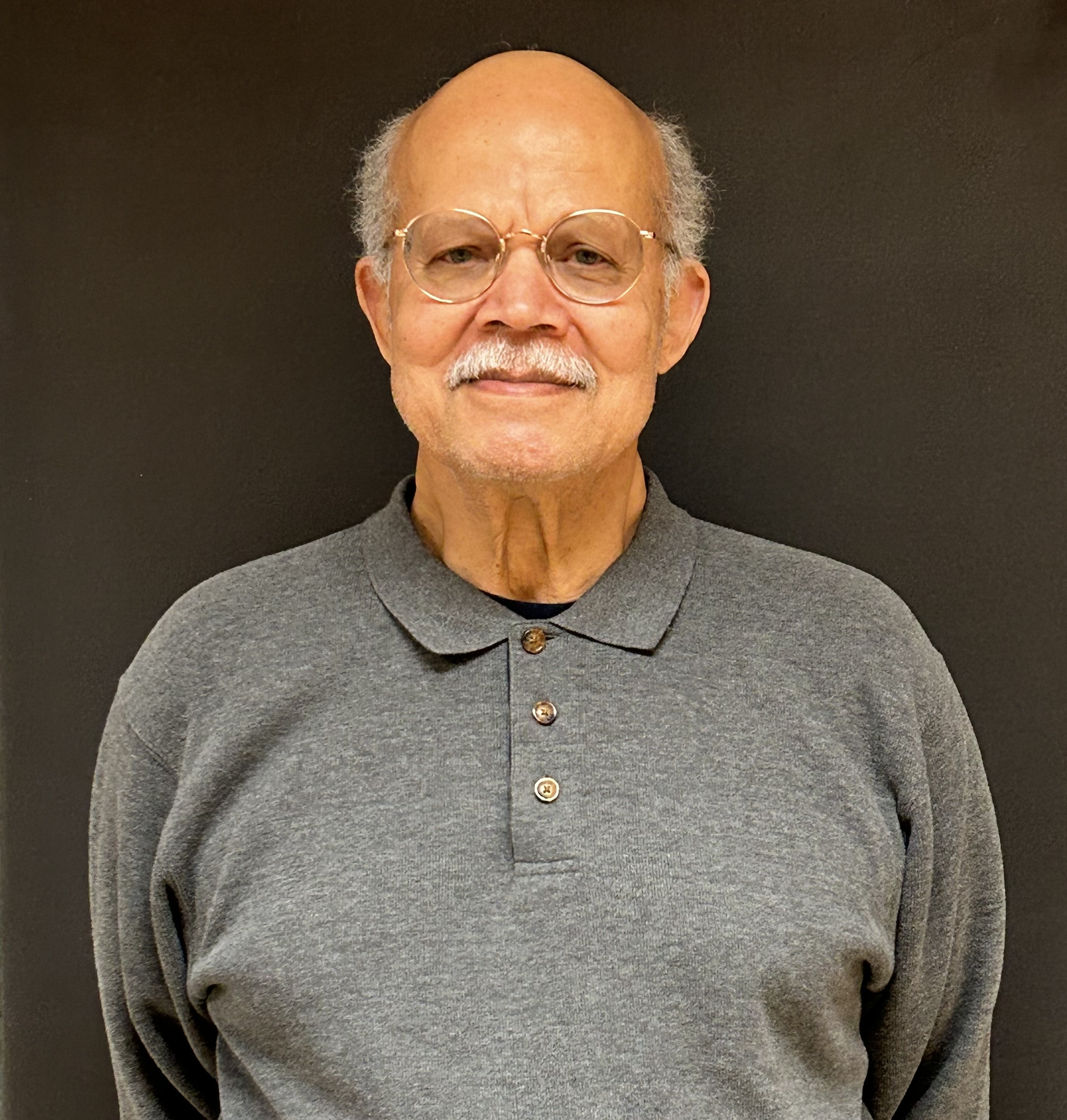
- Abdul Alkalimat
- Born: Gerald Arthur McWorter; November 21, 1942 (age 83); Chicago, Illinois, U.S.
- Education: Ottawa University (B.A.); University of Chicago (M.A., Ph.D.)
- Occupations: Professor of African-American studies and library and information science; Author
- Employer: University of Illinois at Urbana–Champaign
- Notable work: Introduction to Afro-American Studies: A Peoples College Primer (1984); The History of Black Studies (2021)
- Relatives: Free Frank McWorter (great-great-grandfather)
- Website: alkalimat.org/websites.html

Abdul Alkalimat (born Gerald Arthur McWorter, November 21, 1942) is an American professor of African-American studies and library and information science at the University of Illinois at Urbana–Champaign. He is the author of several books, including Introduction to Afro-American Studies (1984), The African American Experience in Cyberspace (2004), Malcolm X for Beginners (1990), and The History of Black Studies (2021). He curates two websites related to African-American history, "Malcolm X: A Research Site" and "eBlack Studies".

Alkalimat is the great-great-grandson of Free Frank McWorter.

== Biography ==
Born as Gerald Arthur McWorter in Chicago's Cook County Hospital, he lived with his family in the Frances Cabrini Houses until 1953, when they moved to the city's West Side. In a 2003 interview, Alkalimat remembered his childhood in public housing:

Though I remember ... people outside the project saying, "Ah, you're living on welfare, kinda." But I think I had a childhood second to none. I remember those years as golden years, frankly. I cherish having grown up in Cabrini.

Alkalimat attended Ottawa University, where he earned a B.A. in sociology and philosophy in 1963. He completed his M.A. in sociology at the University of Chicago in 1966, and earned a Ph.D. in sociology there in 1974.

During the late 1960s, he helped create the Institute of the Black World (IBW) in Atlanta with professors Vincent Harding and Stephen Henderson and other student activists, including Howard Dodson, A. B. Spellman, William Strickland, and Council Taylor. The IBW became "the most dynamic black 'think tank' of the era", according to Peniel E. Joseph, assistant professor of Africana studies at Stony Brook University.

In the early 1970s, Alkalimat established Peoples College, a black nationalist think tank. Acknowledged as a founder of Black Studies, he wrote Introduction to Afro-American Studies: A Peoples College Primer, first published in 1984, which has become a popular text and gone through several editions.

Alkalimat helped to organize the Illinois Council for Black Studies, and in 1982 he hosted the annual meeting of the National Council for Black Studies (NCBS). He was elected the NCBS chairman, but the organization's board questioned the results and called for a new election the following year to determine whether Alkalimat's ascension to the post was legitimate. In an election that many members considered confusing, Alkalimat was voted out. New voting rules were adopted by the board that made the results retroactive, stripping Alkalimat of his chairmanship.

In 1991, Alkalimat wrote Malcolm X for Beginners. He and his publisher, Writers and Readers Press, were sued by Betty Shabazz, the widow of Malcolm X, and Pathfinder Press, which has exclusive rights to publish Malcolm X's speeches. Shabazz and Pathfinder alleged the book contained quotations from Malcolm X without permission. Alkalimat and his publisher said that the book's quotations were permitted under the fair use doctrine. The matter was settled out of court, with Alkalimat relinquishing all royalties from the book.

== Selected works ==
- Introduction to Afro-American Studies (1984), Urbana, Ill.: University of Illinois Press (available online)
- Harold Washington and the Crisis of Black Power in Chicago (1989), Chicago: Twenty-First Century Books (with Douglas C. Gills)
- Malcolm X for Beginners (1990), New York: Writers and Readers Press (available for download in PDF format)
- Job?Tech: The Technological Revolution and Its Impact on Society (1995), Chicago: Twenty-First Century Books (with Douglas C. Gills and Kate Williams)
- The African American Experience in Cyberspace: A Resource Guide to the Best Websites on Black Culture and History (2004), Sterling, Va.: Pluto Press
- eBlack Studies (2004), Chicago: Twenty-First Century Books
- "Cyberpower". Public Sphere Project. Schuler. 2008. (with Kate Williams)
- Revolutionary Ubuntu: The shackdwellers and poor people of South Africa, eBlack Studies, 2009 (available for download in PDF format)
- Black Toledo: A Documentary History of the African American Experience in Toledo, Ohio (2017), Leiden & Boston: Brill
- The Wall of Respect: Public Art and Black Liberation in 1960s Chicago (co‑editor, with Romi Crawford and Rebecca Zorach). Northwestern University Press, 2017. ISBN 9780810135932
- The History of Black Studies (October 2021), London: Pluto Press
- Dialectics of Liberation: The African Liberation Support Movement (2022), Africa World Press
