= Museum of Latin American Art =

Art museum in Long Beach, California

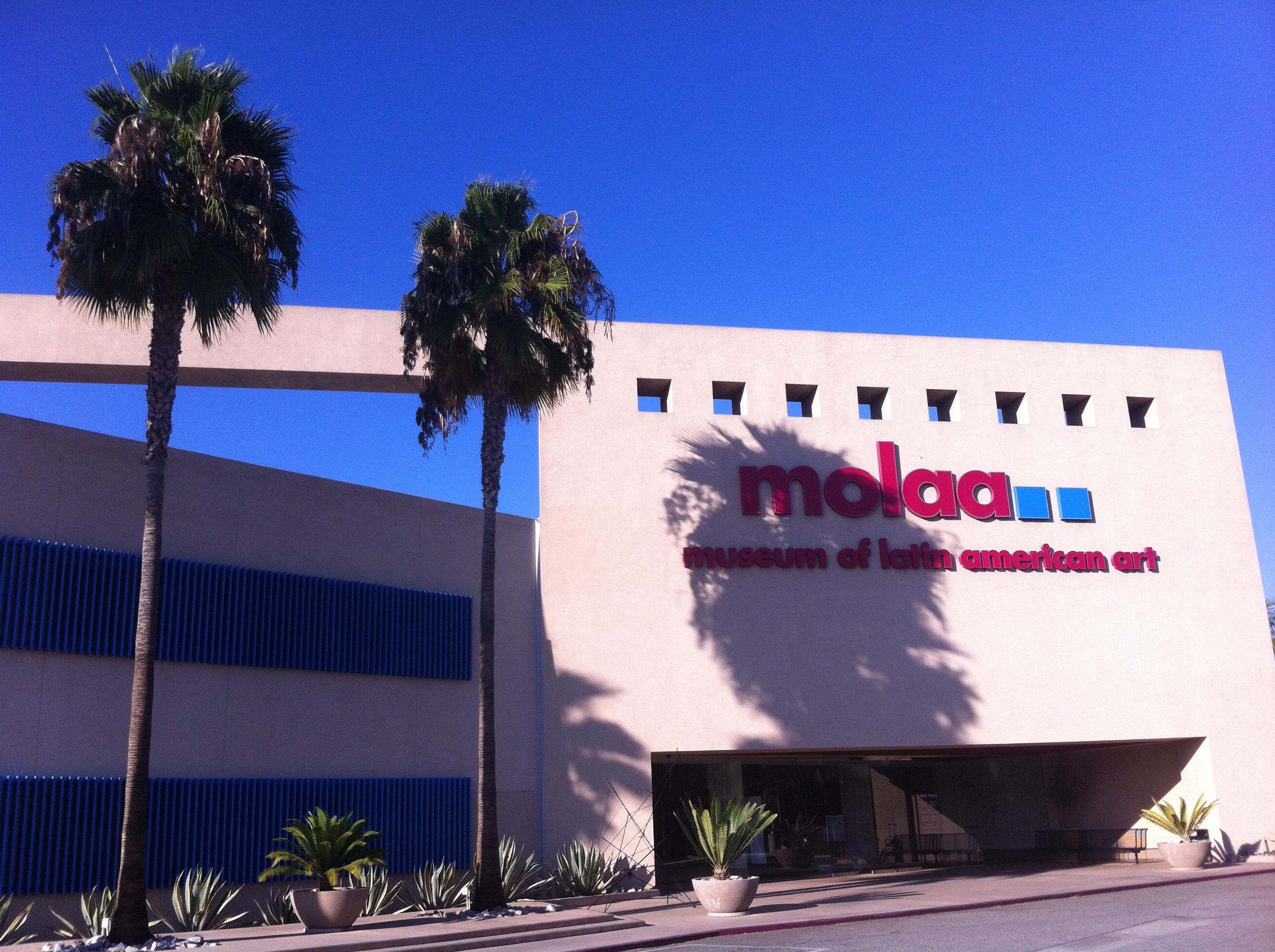
- Interactive fullscreen map
- Established: 1996
- Location: 628 Alamitos Avenue; Long Beach, California 90802, United States
- Coordinates: 33.7746°N 118.1796°W
- Type: Modern and Contemporary Latin American Art
- Website: www.molaa.org

The Museum of Latin American Art (MOLAA) was founded by Dr. Robert Gumbiner in 1996 in Long Beach, California, United States, and serves the greater Los Angeles area. MOLAA is the only museum in the United States dedicated to modern and contemporary Latin American and Latino art.

== History ==
The Museum of Latin American Art (MOLAA) is located in downtown Long Beach, California. Housed in a contemporary structure designed by Mexican architect Manuel Rosen, the museum is home to four galleries, a contemporary “project space” and an outdoor sculpture garden.

Founded in 1996 by Dr. Robert Gumbiner, MOLAA is the only museum in the United States dedicated to modern and contemporary Latin American art. Through ground-breaking exhibitions, educational programs and cultural events, MOLAA expands the knowledge and appreciation of modern and contemporary Latin American art and culture and promotes a cross-cultural dialogue.

== Site and building ==
MOLAA is located in Long Beach's developing East Village Arts District. Between 1913 and 1918 the site that the museum now occupies was the home of the Balboa Amusement Producing Company, then the world's most productive and innovative silent film studio. Before there was a Hollywood, Balboa was the king of the silver screen, producing nearly 20,000 feet of film a week. The building that was renovated in 1998 as MOLAA's Entertainment / Education / Special Event venue may have been part of the old Balboa film studio. MOLAA's exhibition galleries, administrative offices and store are housed in what was once a roller skating rink known as the Hippodrome. Built in the late 1920s, after the film studios were gone, the Hippodrome was a haven for skaters for four decades. The high vaulted ceilings and beautiful wooden floors were perfectly suited for the Hippodrome's final metamorphosis into the Museum of Latin American Art.

== Expansion and renovation ==
After completing a $10 million expansion and renovation, MOLAA unveiled its newly expanded campus in June, 2007. The renovation and expansion included a 15,000 square foot sculpture garden, an education / art studio, a film-screening room, new administrative offices, a research library, a new entrance lobby and museum store. The expansion more than doubled the museum's physical capacity to 55,000 square feet enabling MOLAA to serve many more visitors and broaden the range of exhibitions and programs offered to the community.

== Sculpture Garden ==
MOLAA's Sculpture Garden continued the same theme of large wall elements, interlocking platonic solids, decorative wall niches and the use of strong vibrant accent colors found in many Latin American courtyard designs.

Different raised and lowered platforms break up the 15,000 sq. ft. space into smaller intimate areas. The main focal point is the raised platform on the north side of the garden that is used for a variety of purposes, as well as an entertainment venue. In keeping with the Latin design tradition, the garden also features a water element – two low profile bubbling water fountains, the largest being located in the center of the garden.

== Collection ==
MOLAA has a permanent collection, numbering over 1,500 works of painting, sculpture, drawing, mixed-media, photography and video art. MOLAA's collection also includes works from Latin American artists such as Dario Escobar, Pájaro (Juan Vicente Hernández), Daniel Lind-Ramos, Marco Maggi, Liliana Porter, Esterio Segura, Flavio Garciandia and many others.

In 2026, MOLAA partnered with technology company Global Objects to digitally preserve physical artworks and exhibition galleries using 3D scanning and LiDAR technologies to create archival digital twins.

== Smithsonian affiliation ==
MOLAA is recognized as an Affiliate Museum of the Smithsonian Institution. This allows it to borrow works from the Smithsonian and use other resources as well.

== Traveling exhibitions ==
Past exhibitions have highlighted works by modern masters such as Oswaldo Guayasamín, Wifredo Lam and David Alfaro Siqueiros as well as works by contemporary Latin American artists such as Regina Galindo, Roberto Fabelo and Marcos Ramirez Erre.

== Notable exhibitions ==
Fabelo’s Anatomy June 28, 2014 - September 28, 2014. This exhibition at MOLAA is the first solo museum exhibition of Roberto Fabelo's work in the United States.

In March 2014, MOLAA hosted Frida Kahlo, Her Photos exhibit. 55,000 people visited the exhibit and the membership increased by 60%.

In June 2014, MOLAA's Board unanimously passed a resolution that clarified the definition of Latin American art to include Chicano art or art created by people of Latin American descent who have lived exclusively in the United States. The museum can now officially open its doors to the entire Latino community – those living in their native countries, the U.S. or abroad and is already planning its first Biennial of Latin(o) American Art in 2016 in conjunction with MOLAA's 20th anniversary.

== Mission ==
The Museum of Latin American Art expands knowledge and appreciation of modern and contemporary Latin American art and Latino art through its collection, ground-breaking exhibitions, stimulating educational programs, and engaging cultural events.

== Location and hours ==
The Museum of Latin American Art is located in 628 Alamitos Avenue, Long Beach, CA 90802. There is free parking available at the museum or on the street. MOLAA hours of operation are

HOURS

MUSEUM GALLERIES, GARDEN & STORE

MON CLOSED

TUE CLOSED

WED 11:00 a.m. - 5:00 p.m.

THU 11:00 a.m. - 5:00 p.m.

FRI 11:00 a.m. - 5:00 p.m.

SAT 11:00 a.m. - 5:00 p.m.

SUN 11:00 a.m. - 5:00 p.m.

(HOLIDAYS MAY DIFFER)

Phone []

For more information go to https://molaa.org/
