= Romi Crawford =

American educator, writer, and professor of Visual and Critical Studies

- Education: University of Chicago (MA, PHD)
- Occupations: Educator; writer
- Employer: School of the Art Institute of Chicago
- Known for: New Art School Modality

Romi Crawford, is an American educator, writer, curator, art historian and professor of visual and critical studies at the School of the Art Institute of Chicago (SAIC). She researches how artistic practice generates knowledge, particularly through collaboration engaging the intersections of race, culture, and visual representation.

== Education ==
Crawford attended the University of Chicago where she received both an MA and a PhD in English literature, theory, and criticism.

== Career ==
=== Scholarship ===
Crawford is an art historian and professor of visual and critical Studies at SAIC, where her research focuses on how artistic methods function as forms of knowledge creation, often examining the relationship between art-making, race, ethnicity, and American visual and pop culture.

She is the initiator of two pedagogical platforms: the Black Arts Movement School Modality and the New Art School Modality (NASM) for collaborative, intergenerational learning and alternative values in arts education.

=== New Art School Modality (NASM) ===
Launched in 2023, the New Art School Modality (NASM) proposes an alternative, non-degree model for art and art-historical study, grounded in practices of collaboration, experimentation, and improvisation associated with the Black Arts Movement. The Terra Foundation for American Art supports the NASM initiative through a multi-year funding partnership, supporting free courses for students.

=== Documenta 16 ===
In August 2025, artistic director Naomi Beckwith announced an all-female artistic team for documenta 16, naming Crawford alongside Carla Acevedo‑Yates, Xiaoyu Weng, and Mayra A. Rodríguez Castro to collaborate on the exhibition, publications, and programming for the 2027 edition.

== Selected projects ==
=== Publications ===
- Alkalimat, Abdul; Crawford, Romi; Zorach, Rebecca, eds. (2017). The Wall of Respect: public art and Black liberation in 1960s Chicago. Northwestern University Press. ISBN 978-0-8101-3593-2.
- Crawford, Romi, ed. (2021). Fleeting monuments for the Wall of Respect. Chicago: The Green Lantern press. ISBN 978-0-9974165-9-6.

=== Exhibitions ===
- Radical Relations!: Memory, Objects and the Generation of the Political, University of Chicago Center for the Study of Gender and Sexuality, 2017.
- Citing Black Geographies, Richard Gray Gallery, Chicago and New York, 2022.
- So Be It! Asé!: Photographic Echoes of FESTAC ’77, Richard Gray Gallery, New York, 2023.

== See also ==
- documenta
- Xiaoyu Weng
- Naomi Beckwith
