= Kanitra Fletcher =

American curator

- Education: Rutgers University–New Brunswick (BA); University of Texas at Austin (MA); Cornell University (PhD)
- Occupations: Curator, Art Historian
- Years active: 2013-Present
- Employer: National Gallery of Art
- Title: Associate Curator of African American and Afro-Diasporic Art

Kanitra Fletcher is an American curator and art historian currently working as associate curator of African American and Afro-Diasporic art at the National Gallery of Art in Washington, D.C. Named to her role in January 2021 after serving as an associate curator at the Museum of Fine Arts, Houston, Fletcher is the National Gallery's first curator dedicated to acquiring, stewarding, and exhibiting work by African American artists. Fletcher's academic specializations include the art of Brazil and Latin America and the Black avant-garde.

== Education and early career ==
Fletcher was raised in Houston. She graduated from Rutgers University–New Brunswick with a BA in English literature before receiving an MA in Latin American studies from the University of Texas at Austin in 2011. In 2019 she earned a PhD in art history from Cornell University, where her thesis focused on Black aesthetics and the Black avant-garde in the mid-20th century.

She worked as an assistant at a number of museums in New York prior to her career as a curator, including the Bronx Museum of the Arts, Museum of Modern Art, and New Museum.

== Curatorial career ==
In 2013, Fletcher was chosen as the curator of video art at Landmarks, the public art program of her alma mater UT Austin.

She began at the Museum of Fine Arts, Houston (MFAH) as a curatorial assistant in July 2017 before becoming an associate curator of modern and contemporary art. During her time at MFAH she oversaw the 2021 showing of Soul of a Nation: Art in the Age of Black Power, which originated at the Tate Modern in London in 2017.

Fletcher was announced as the National Gallery of Art's first associate curator of African American and Afro-Diasporic art on January 13, 2021. Her first curated show at the National Gallery was Afro-Atlantic Histories in 2022, which she had first adapted for MFAH in 2021 from its original showing at the São Paulo Museum of Art.

Fletcher's subsequent shows at the National Gallery include Spirit & Strength: Modern Art from Haiti, Chakaia Booker: Treading New Ground, and With Passion and Purpose: Gifts from the Collection of Larry D. and Brenda A. Thompson.
