= Stephanie Dinkins =

- Born: 1964 (age 61–62); Perth Amboy, New Jersey, U.S.
- Education: Maryland Institute College of Art; The Whitney Independent Study Program
- Website: stephaniedinkins.com

Stephanie Dinkins (born 1964) is a transdisciplinary American artist based in Brooklyn, New York.

She creates art about artificial intelligence (AI) as it intersects with race, gender, and history. Her aim is to "create a unique culturally attuned AI entity [...] that reflects and is empowered to work toward the goals of its community."

Dinkins projects include Conversations with Bina48, a series of conversations between Dinkins and the humanoid robotic chatbot BINA48, and Not the Only One, an AI trained off of three generations of Dinkins's family's recorded memories.

== Early life and education ==
Dinkins was born in Perth Amboy, New Jersey, to Black American parents who raised her in Staten Island, New York. She credits her grandmother with teaching her how to think about art as a social practice through her grandmother's community gardening work.

Dinkins attended the International Center of Photography School in New York City in 1995, where she completed the general studies in photography certificate program. Dinkins received an MFA in photography from the Maryland Institute College of Art in 1997. She completed the Independent Study Program at the Whitney Museum of American Art.

== Career ==
Dinkins is the Kusama Endowed Professor of Art at Stony Brook University in New York. Dinkins was part of the jury that selected Shu Lea Cheang for the LG Guggenheim Award in 2024.

Dinkins's practice employs technologies including new media such as artificial intelligence and machine learning. Dinkins uses oral history techniques of interviewing to craft narratives and databases which inform her work and serve as acts of social intervention or protest.

Dinkins advocates for co-creation within a social practice art framework, so that vulnerable communities understand how to use technology to their advantage, instead of being subjected to their use. Dinkins warns of the dangers to members of minority groups that are absent from the creation of the computer algorithms that affect their lives.

=== Conversations with Bina48 ===
Dinkins began working on Conversations with Bina48 in 2014. Five years after BINA48, a social robot that resembles a middle-aged black woman, was released, Dinkins came across a YouTube video of it, leading her to travel to Lincoln, Vermont, where she conducted a series of interviews engaging the robot in conversations pertaining to race, intimacy, and the nature of being. Dinkins mirrors BINA48 while they discuss identity and technological singularity.

Although it is based on a black woman, Dinkins found that BINA48 was shaped by the biases of its white, male creators. The conversations suggest opportunities for complementing human existence with AI agents, but also show artificial intelligence's current limitations.

Dinkins appears in episode six of the HBO television series Random Acts of Flyness directed by Terence Nance, where she describes her conversations with BINA48.

=== Project al Kwarizmi (PAK) ===
Project al Kwarizmi (PAK) was a series of pop-up workshops in Brooklyn at Eyebeam and Recess, in Manhattan at Google, and Durham, North Carolina at Duke University. The workshops involve collaborating with youth in the criminal justice system. The workshops "'use art and aesthetics as a common language' to help citizens understand the ways algorithms currently hinder communities of color."

=== Not the Only One (N'TOO) ===
Not the only one (N’TOO) is a voice-interactive chatbot that was trained with data from members of Dinkins' family. Dinkins describes N'TOO as an experimental multigenerational memoir of a Black American family told by an AI agent. N'TOO uses a recursive neural network.

=== Future Histories Studio ===
Dinkins is the founder and director of Future Histories Studio, a research laboratory for arts-centered inquiry and production based at Stony Brook University. The studio was established with support from the Andrew W. Mellon Foundation as part of the Digital Inquiry, Speculation, Collaboration, and Optimism (DISCO) network.

== Exhibitions ==
Dinkins' work has been exhibited in various venues, including the de Young Museum; the Philadelphia Museum of Art; the Museum of Contemporary Photography; the Long Island Museum of American Art, History, and Carriages; the International Center of Photography; Herning Museum of Contemporary Art; the Barbican Centre; the Islip Art Museum; Wave Hill; and Taller Boricua. She has presented her work in symposia at the Museum of Modern Art and other venues.

== Awards and recognition ==
Dinkins is the recipient of the 2023 LG Guggenheim Award, a Berggruen Institute Artist Fellowship, a Sundance New Frontiers Story Lab fellowship, a Soros Equality Fellowship, a Lucas Artists Fellowship, a Creative Capital grant, a Blade of Grass fellowship, and a Data & Society fellowship.
