= Lynette Yiadom-Boakye =

British painter and writer (born 1977)

- Born: 1977 (age 48–49); London, United Kingdom
- Education: Central St. Martins, Falmouth University, Royal Academy of Art
- Known for: Painting, writing
- Awards: Carnegie Prize, Arts Foundation fellowship for painting, Pinchuk Foundation Future Generation Prize, Next Generation Prize from the New Museum of Contemporary Art, South Bank Sky Arts Award for Visual Art

Lynette Yiadom-Boakye (born 1977) is a British painter and writer of Ghanaian heritage. She is best known for her portraits of imaginary subjects, or ones derived from found objects, which are painted in muted colours. Her work has contributed to the renaissance in painting the Black figure. Her paintings often are presented in solo exhibitions.

== Early life and career ==
Lynette Yiadom-Boakye was born in London, UK, where she currently lives and works. Her parents worked as nurses for the National Health Service after emigrating from Ghana in the 1960s. Yiadom-Boakye describes herself as "a boring child—good grades, no mischief—but also quite good at living in my head, using my imagination as an escape." As a senior in high school, she took an art foundations course as an experiment and afterwards gave up her previous intentions to become an optician in order to become an artist.

Yiadom-Boakye attended Central St. Martins College of Art and Design (1996-7); she did not, however, enjoy her time there, so she transferred to Falmouth College of Art (1997-2000) where she eventually was awarded her undergraduate degree in 2000. She then completed an MA degree at the Royal Academy Schools in 2003. It was in her final year of graduate school there that she came to a realization that changed the direction of her work. In an interview with Dodie Kazanjian of Vogue, she stated "Instead of trying to put complicated narratives into my work, I decided to simplify, and focus on just the figure and how it was painted. That in itself would carry the narrative." Following college, she worked to support herself until 2006, when she received an Arts Foundation Fellowship for painting.

In 2010, her work was recognized by Okwui Enwezor. With curator Naomi Beckwith, Enwezor catalogued her exhibition at Studio Museum in Harlem. She was among those nominated for the Turner Prize in 2013. In addition to her artwork, Yiadom-Boakye has taught at the Ruskin School of Art and Oxford University, where she is a visiting tutor for their Master in Fine Arts programme. Her influence as a painter was recognized in the 2019 Powerlist and she was subsequently listed among the "top 10" of the most influential people of African or African Caribbean heritage in the UK in 2020.

== Work ==
Skylark (2010) by Lynette Yiadom-Boakye at the National Gallery of Art's showing of Afro-Atlantic Histories in Washington, DC in 2022

=== Artworks ===
Yiadom-Boakye's work consists mostly of painted portraits of imaginary Black subjects. Her paintings are predominantly figurative, with raw and muted colors. The characteristic dark palette of her work is known for creating a feeling of stillness that contributes to the timeless nature of her subjects. Her portraits of imaginary individuals feature people reading, lounging, and resting in traditional poses. She brings to the depiction of her subjects contemplative facial expressions and relaxed gestures, making their posture and mood relatable to many viewers. Commentators have attributed some of the acclaim of Yiadom-Boakye's work to this relatability. She strives to keep her subjects from being associated with a particular decade or time. This results in choices such as not painting shoes on her subjects, as footwear often serves as a time stamp. These figures usually rest in front of ambiguous backgrounds, floating inside monochromatic dark hues. These cryptic, but emotional backdrops remind commentators of old masters such as Velázquez and Degas.

The artist's style shifted slightly after the opening of her 2017 show "In Lieu of a Louder Love". The show featured a new, warmer colour scheme. Her subjects in this show included more vibrant details such as a checkered linoleum-floor, a bold headwrap and bathing suit, and a yellow, orange, and green background.

Although each portrait only contains one person, the paintings typically are presented in groups that are arranged as if family portraits. With her expressive representations of the human figure, Yiadom-Boakye examines the formal mechanisms of the medium of painting and reveals political and psychological dimensions in her works, which focus on imaginary characters who exist beyond our world in a different time and in an unknown location. She paints figures who are intentionally removed from time and place, and has stated, "People ask me, ‘Who are they, where are they?’ What they should be asking is ‘what' are they?"

Yiadom-Boakye takes inspiration for her paintings from the found objects she uses as well as personal memories, literature, and art history of painting. She also finds inspiration from music and artists including: Miles Davis, John Coltrane, Bill Evans, Nick Drake, Lisa Yuskavage, Chris Offili, and Isaac Julien.

The Tate Museum provides an introduction to her work that is extensive, to accompany a major exhibition of her work held from 2 December 2020 to 9 May 2021.

=== Writing ===
For an artist, Yiadom-Boakye is unusual in describing herself as a writer as much as a painter—her short stories and prose poems frequently appear in her catalogues.

Examples of her works shown in catalogues includes five extracts from a detective novel entitled "an Officer of the Law" and some intermittent notes on criminality. Her story "an Officer of the Law" is a fictional short story that utilizes animals for the characters. Yiadom-Boakye also creates poetry as shown in her intermittent note "Something Close to a Confession." An example of this:

"Dead but for the life in me,

Where Black rivers run in the Bath,

Having eaten the Activist and her Cause

And alerted the Ugly to all their Flaws

I Bask where God cannot see me.

On Vacant lot, my eyes make water

And draw the blinds against a Slaughter."

In talks about her work, the artist notes that her writing is to her as her painting is, and explains that she "writes the things she doesn't paint and paints all the things she doesn't write". Her paintings are given poetic titles.

== Art market ==
At a 2019 auction at Phillips in London, Yiadom-Boakye's Leave A Brick Under The Maple (2015), a life-size portrait of a standing man, sold for about $1 million.

At the 2022 Christie's 20th/21st Century Frieze Week season auction, Yiadom-Boakye's Highpower was estimated at £600,000 and sold for £1,482,000

== Subject for work of others ==
Painted in 2017, Kehinde Wiley's Portrait of Lynette Yiadom-Boakye, Jacob Morland of Capplethwaite is displayed in the Yale Center for British Art in New Haven, CT.

A portrait of Yiadom-Boakye by photographer Sal Idriss is held in the collection of the National Portrait Gallery, London.

Poem After an Iteration of a Painting by Lynette Yiadom-Boakye, Destroyed by the Artist Herself by Ama Codje was published by the Massachusetts Review on 26 December 2019.

== Exhibitions ==
Yiadom-Boakye has staged numerous solo exhibitions at museums and galleries internationally. Her notable solo shows include Any Number of Preoccupations (2010), Studio Museum in Harlem, New York; Verses After Dusk (2015), Serpentine Galleries, London; A Passion To A Principle (2016), Kunsthalle Basel, Switzerland; Under-Song For a Cipher (2017), New Museum, New York; The Hilton Als Series: Lynette Yiadom-Boakye (2020), the Huntington Library, San Marino; and Fly In League With The Night (2022-2023), Tate Britain, London.

She has also participated in a number of group shows and exhibitions, including the 55th Venice Biennale (2013); the Sharjah Biennial (2015); 58th Venice Biennale (2019), and Afro-Atlantic Histories (2021-2022). Yiadom-Boakye's work is included in several museum collections in the United States including the Carnegie Museum of Art, and the Pérez Art Museum Miami collection, and the picture King for an Hour was on view at the institution's long-term display for 2023.

== Awards ==
Yiadom-Boakye has been widely hailed for her work, winning accolades including The Arts Foundation fellowship for painting (2006), the Pinchuk Foundation Future Generation Prize (2012), Next Generation Prize from the New Museum of Contemporary Art (2013), South Bank Sky Arts Award for Visual Art (2016) and the Carnegie Prize at 57th edition of Carnegie International (2018). She was also nominated for the Turner Prize (2013).

== Notable works in public collections ==
- Nous étions (2007), Studio Museum in Harlem, New York
- The Fondness (2010), Nelson-Atkins Museum of Art, Kansas City, Missouri
- Tambourine (2010), Nasher Museum of Art, Durham, North Carolina
- Skylark (2010), Museum of Modern Art, New York
- King for an Hour (2011), Pérez Art Museum Miami
- Bracken or Moss (2012), Museum of Contemporary Art, Chicago
- 10pm Saturday (2012), Tate, London
- Siskin (2012), Victoria and Albert Museum, London
- A Few For the Many (2013), Los Angeles County Museum of Art
- Appreciation of the Inches (2013), San Francisco Museum of Modern Art
- Observer of Spring (2013) Museum of Modern Art, Warsaw
- Trapsprung (2013), Seattle Art Museum
- Womanology 12 (2014), National Museum of African Art, Smithsonian Institution, Washington, D.C.
- A Culmination (2016), Kunstmuseum Basel, Switzerland
- 8am Cadiz (2017), Baltimore Museum of Art
- Medicine at Playtime (2017), Museum of Contemporary Art, Los Angeles
- The Much-Vaunted Air (2017), Institute of Contemporary Art, Boston
- No Need of Speech (2018), Carnegie Museum of Art, Pittsburgh
- Repose 3 (2018), Dallas Museum of Art
- Shelves for Dynamite (2018), Minneapolis Institute of Art
