= Rebecca Zorach =

American art historian

- Occupation: Art history professor

Academic background
- Education: University of Chicago

Academic work
- Institutions: Northwestern University
- Notable works: Blood, Milk, Ink, Gold

Rebecca Zorach (born 1969) is an art historian and Mary Jane Crowe Professor in Art and Art History at Northwestern University. Her work focuses on early modern European art and contemporary activist art.

Zorach earned her PhD from the University of Chicago in 1999.

Zorach won the 2006 Gustave O. Arlt Award in the Humanities from the Council of Graduate Schools and the 2006 Book Award from the Society for the Study of Early Modern Women for her book Blood, Milk, Ink, Gold: Abundance and Excess in the French Renaissance.

== Works ==
- ed. Embodied Utopias: Gender, Social Change, and the Modern Metropolis with Amy Bingaman and Lisa Shapiro Sanders (Routledge, 2002)
- Blood, Milk, Ink, Gold: Abundance and Excess in the French Renaissance (University of Chicago Press, 2005)
- Paper Museums: The Reproductive Print in Europe 1500-1800 with Elizabeth Rodini (Smart Museum of Art/University of Chicago, 2005)
- The Virtual Tourist in Renaissance Rome: Printing and Collecting the Speculum Romanae Magnificentiae (University of Chicago Library, 2008)
- ed. The Idol in the Age of Art with Michael Cole (Routledge, 2009)
- The Passionate Triangle (University of Chicago Press, 2011)
- ed. Art Against the Law (School of the Art Institute of Chicago, 2014)
- Gold: Nature and Culture with Michael W. Phillips Jr. (Reaktion Books, 2016)
- ed. The Wall of Respect: Public Art and Black Liberation in 1960s Chicago with Abdul Alkalimat and Romi Crawford (Northwestern University Press, 2017)
