= Naomi Beckwith =

American art historian and curator (born 1976)

- Born: 1976 (age 49–50)
- Education: Northwestern University; Courtauld Institute of Art
- Occupations: Art historian; curator

Naomi Beckwith (born 1976) is an American art historian who has served as the deputy director and chief curator of the Solomon R. Guggenheim Museum since 2021. Previously she had been the senior curator at the Museum of Contemporary Art Chicago (MCA) since 2018, having joined the institution in 2011.

== Early life and education ==
Beckwith was born in Chicago, growing up in Hyde Park and attending Lincoln Park High School. She received a BA degree in history from Northwestern University in Evanston, Illinois. She completed an MA at the Courtauld Institute of Art in London, presenting her master's thesis on Adrian Piper and Carrie Mae Weems.

Beckwith was then a Helena Rubinstein Critical Studies Fellow at the Whitney Museum of American Art Independent Study Program in New York. She named a 2011 arts leader to watch by ArtTable.

== Career ==
=== Early career ===
Beckwith was the Whitney Lauder Curatorial Fellow at the Institute of Contemporary Art, Philadelphia, where she worked on numerous exhibitions including Locally Localized Gravity (2007), an exhibition and program of events presented by more than 100 artists whose practices are social, participatory, and communal. She was then associate curator at the Studio Museum in Harlem.

Beckwith has also been the BAMart project coordinator at the Brooklyn Academy of Music (BAM) and a guest blogger for Art:21. She has curated exhibitions at New York alternative spaces Recess Activities, Cuchifritos, and Artists Space. In 2018, she served as curatorial adviser for the biennial SITElines art exhibition in Santa Fe. In 2021, she was a member of the curatorial team – alongside Massimiliano Gioni, Glenn Ligon and Mark Nash – that realized Okwui Enwezor's posthumous show Grief and Grievance: Art and Mourning in America at the New Museum.

Beckwith was a member of the international jury that selected Armenia as recipient of the Golden Lion for best national participation at the 56th Venice Biennale in 2015. She later served on the jury that chose Deana Lawson as recipient of the Guggenheim’s 2020 Hugo Boss Prize.

=== Guggenheim Museum ===
Since joining the Guggenheim and succeeding Nancy Spector in 2021, Beckwith has overseen the organization's collections and exhibitions programs at its various sites in New York, Bilbao, and Venice.

Beckwith co-chaired (with Fred Wilson) the jury that chose the winners of the Rome Prize for the 2023–24 cycle.

In December 2024, Beckwith was chosen as artistic director of documenta 16, to be held in Kassel in summer 2027. She ensembled an all‑female artistic team (Carla Acevedo‑Yates, Romi Crawford, Mayra A. Rodríguez Castro, and Xiaoyu Weng) to collaboratively develop the exhibition, publications, and programming.

== Major exhibitions ==
Beckwith curated the exhibition 30 Seconds off an Inch, which was presented by the Studio Museum in Harlem from November 12, 2009 – March 14, 2010. Exhibiting artworks by 42 artists of color and those inspired by black culture from over 10 countries, the show asked viewers to think about ways in which social meaning is embedded formally within artworks.

Lynette Yiadom-Boakye: Any Number of Preoccupations was on view at the Studio Museum from 2010 to 2011, marking British artist Lynette Yiadom-Boakye’s first solo museum show, with 24 canvases on display.

In 2018, Beckwith also co-curated the first major survey of the art of Howardena Pindell at the MCA.

== Other activities ==
Beckwith serves on the board of the Laundromat Project (New York) and formerly served on the board of Res Artis (Amsterdam). Beckwith served on the board of the Andy Warhol Foundation for the Visual Arts from 2018-2026.

== Recognition ==
Beckwith has been awarded the 2017 VIA (Visionary Initiatives in Art) Art Fund Curatorial Fellowship, the 2017 Center for Curatorial Leadership Fellowship, and the High Museum of Art's 2024 David C. Driskell Prize.

== Personal life ==
Beckwith is married.
