= William Downs (artist) =

William Downs is an artist. He was born in Greenville, South Carolina, and lives in Atlanta, Georgia.

== Exhibitions ==
- 2019 a soft place to land, E.C. Lina Gallery, Los Angeles, CA
- 2019 standing on the verge of..., GrizzlyGrizzly, Philadelphia, PA
- 2018 Inhuman, Sandler Hudson Gallery, Atlanta, GA
- 2018 sometimes it hurts, Contemporary Art Museum St. Louis, St. Louis, MO
- 2016 aimless revery, The Fuel and Lumber Company, Birmingham, AL, Slag Gallery, NY
- 2011 at ease, Parker Jones Gallery, Los Angeles, CA
- 2009 a world I never made, Slag Gallery, New York, NY
- 2008 fly away fly away, Artspace, New Haven, CT
- 2003 Drawings, Tevis County Gallery, Westminster, MD
- 2002 Drawings 2001–2002, Mission Space, Baltimore, MD
- 1999 Broken Ladders, Chattahoochee Valley Art Museum, La Grange, GA
- 1998 Drawings, ASIS Alternative Space, Atlanta, GA
- 1998 Hands and Feet, Gallery 307, Decatur, GA
- 1997 Broken Ladders, Georgia South Western University, Fine Arts Center Gallery LaGrange, GA
- 1994 Etchings and Monoprints, The Equitable Building, Atlanta, GA
- 1993 Etchings, Yin and Yang Gallery, Atlanta, GA
