= Dalton Paula =

Brazilian artist

Dalton Paula (born 1982) is a Brazilian artist.

Paula's work draws on Afro-Brazilian traditions, and features portraits of contemporary subjects dressed in a historical style. Andrea K. Scott, writing for The New Yorker, has likened the style to retratos pintados, hand-painted photographs from rural Brazil.

The artists's work is included in the collection of the Museum of Modern Art, New York, the Institute of Contemporary Art, Miami, Art Institute of Chicago, and the São Paulo Museum of Art.
