= Rubem Valentim =

Brazilian artist (1922–1991)

- Born: 9 November 1922
- Died: 30 November 1991 (aged 69)
- Occupation: Painter

Rubem Valentim (9 November 1922 – 30 November 1991) was born in Salvador, Bahia, Brazil. A self-taught artist, he started to paint as a child, doing figure and landscapes for Christmas crèches.

== Biography ==
Valentim graduated in dentistry in 1946, and practiced the profession while continuing to paint. In 1948, he left dentistry to devote himself entirely to plastic arts. He went on to study Journalism and received his bachelor's degree from the School of Philosophy of Bahia in 1953. He participated in the renovative movement in the arts, which began in Bahia in 1978–1948. Valentim was devoted to his religion, even becoming a pai-de-santo, or priest, of a famous terreiro in Salvador, Bahia, Brazil. This specific area was home to a budding Afro-Brazilian culture due to being a hub for the Brazilian slave.

== Career ==
In 1957, Valentim moved to Rio de Janeiro. He was awarded a fellowship for travel abroad in 1962 by the XI National Salon of Modern Art. He traveled to Europe for 3 years, expressing an interest in the art of primitive peoples. He eventually settled in Rome, working and holding exhibitions there. He visited the Venice Biennials of 1964 and 1966. He traveled to Senegal to participate in the First World Festival of Negro Art in Dakar, Senegal in 1966. He returned to Brazil in 1966, after accepting an invitation from the Central Institute of the Arts of the University of Brasília. For the year he spent working there, he taught painting while producing his own collection of works with strong Afro-Brazilian influences. He was also awarded a Special Prize for "Contribution to Brazilian Painting".

Valentim's contributions to the art world as writer and essayist are documented in the archives of research institutes and museum libraries across the Americas. He authored and published the Manifesto ainda que tardio (“Manifesto, albeit belated“) in 1976. In the text, he proposes an anticolonial agenda in the arts. His work has received scholarly attention both in Brazil and abroad.

In 2018, the São Paulo Museum of Art (MASP) organized a major career survey showcasing 99 artworks by Valentim, who is a key figure in the 20th-century Brazilian art.

== Artistic Styles ==
Valentim's early artwork and mediums were inspired by mentor, Arthur Come-Só, a local wall painter. His works mostly included homemade paint applied to paper and cardboard mediums. From an early age, Valentim's works were heavily influenced by both politics and religion. His art was a very strong contributor to the African diaspora, implementing key symbols from African communities and religion. Throughout his career, the Yoruba religion of West Africa is a common theme and effect. The orixás, or spiritual deities of Yoruba were guiding figures for Valentim throughout his career.

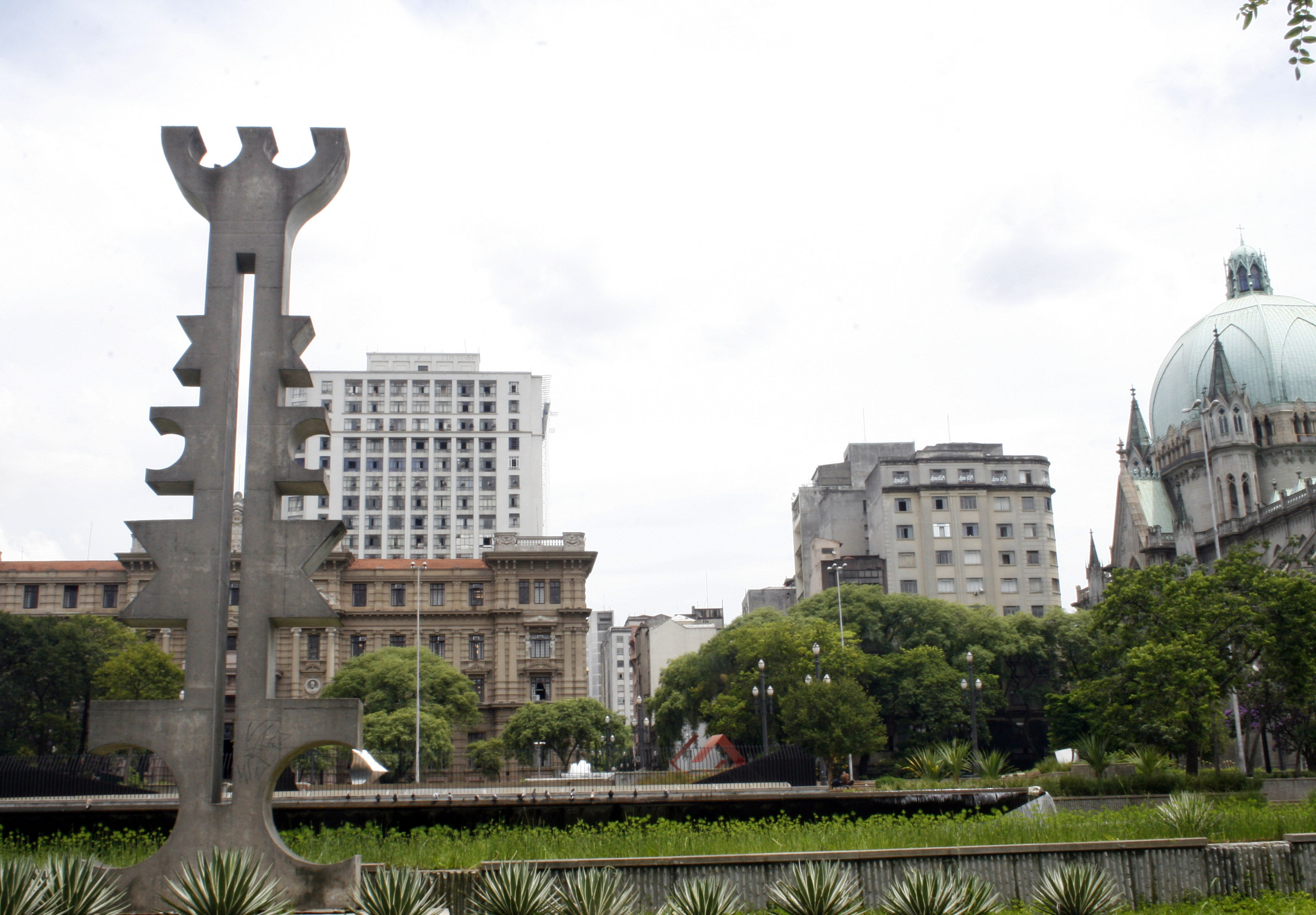
Emblema Sculpture

After moving to Rio de Janeiro in 1957, Valentim engaged in Geometric Abstraction. This form of artwork uses geometric shapes to create abstract art representative of what the artist wants to portray. After moving to Europe in 1962, Valentim's focus shifted to African influences. The source of his involvement was also due in part to his participation in the religion Candomblé. Valentim's work includes symbols such as tools and altars that are common imagery of the Candomblé religion. Of these, Xango's double axe is a consistently reoccurring symbol in Valentim's paintings. Valentim's Emblema Series is another strong representation of his religion background combined with symmetry.. Emblema - 1972 showcases a red rectangle with 4 yellow shapes that pay homage to Ossaim and Yemenja, deities of healing and rivers and seas. With its symmetry and upward movement, the piece evokes an image of an altar.

Another key work of Valentim's is the Ilê Funfun Exhibit, a group of structures designed from concrete and painted completely white. One sculpture in particular, The Temple of Oxalá represents one of the most important entities to the Yoruba religion. Oxalá, whose name means "Lord of the White Cloth", is the deity most related to the creation of man and the world. The exhibit is set up to honor the god Oxalá, where the orishas, or divine spirits portrayed by white sculptures, pay homage to Oxalá as they prepare for a feast. The exhibition is yet again a representation of the large role religion played in Valentim's pieces.

== Notable artworks in public collections ==
- Untitled at the Museum of Modern Art, 1956-1962
- 2x-2 at the Museum of Modern Art, 1960
- Composição 12, 1962. São Paulo Museum of Art (MASP), São Paulo
- Pintura 1 (Painting 1), 1964. Museum of Fine Arts, Boston
- Emblema logotipo poético de cultura afro-brasileira - No 8, 1976. São Paulo Museum of Art, São Paulo
- Emblema 79 (Emblem 79), 1979. Pérez Art Museum Miami
