= La Biennale de Montreal =

La Biennale de Montréal (BNL MTL) is a bi-annual multidisciplinary arts event to confront the Quebec and Canadian art with those of foreign artists around common issues and concepts corresponding to "the timeliness of the art".

Founded in 1998 by Claude Gosselin the Biennale is administered from 1998 to 2011 by the International Contemporary Art of Montreal Center (CWC). In 2011 the Biennale becomes an independent non profit organization.

During its almost twenty years of operation, the BNL MTL brings together artists from the visual arts, landscape architecture, graphic design or object, video and film, creating a place of exchange and debate including seminars and conferences and a wide program of educational activities.

The mission of La Biennale de Montréal is to foster, support, interpret and disseminate the most current visual arts practices by producing the biennial event BNLMTL. In this way, La Biennale de Montréal offers a wide audience a privileged opportunity to grasp the esthetic and social issues addressed by today’s art. La Biennale de Montréal also provides an international platform for Québec and Canadian artists, curators, theoreticians, art critics and researchers working in various fields to meet, encounter and discuss cutting-edge practices, and contribute to different international networks.

All of the initiatives of La Biennale de Montréal are premised on risk and experimentation. Its goal is to support the most daring, thought-provoking art practices and curatorial projects while offering the public a diversity of experiences.

La Biennale de Montréal files for bankruptcy in 2018.

Directors

Claude Gosselin, 1998-2012

Nicole Gingras, 2012-2013

Sylvie Fortin, Executive and Artistic Director, 2013-2017

== See also ==
- Art exhibition
- Art festival
