= John Samuel Raven =

English painter (1829–1877)

John Samuel Raven (21 August 1829 – 13 June 1877) was an English landscape painter.

== Life ==
Raven was born in Preston, Lancashire on 21 August 1829. He was the son of the Rev. Thomas Raven, a clergyman of the Church of England, who had considerable talent as an amateur artist, as may be seen from six water-colour drawings by him in the South Kensington Museum.

John Raven was, however, almost entirely self-taught, initially by studying the works of John Crome and John Constable. He exhibited at the Academy as early as 1845, and his works also appeared at the British Institution. This part of his career was focused on views of the area where he lived, near St. Leonards. He at first fell under the influence of the Norwich school, but his maturer works, which show much poetic feeling, bear traces of pre-Raphaelitism. It was his custom to prepare elaborate cartoons for his pictures. He was drowned while bathing at Harlech in 1877.

He married Margaret Sinclair Dunbar in 1869, later Mrs. William B. Morris.

== Works ==
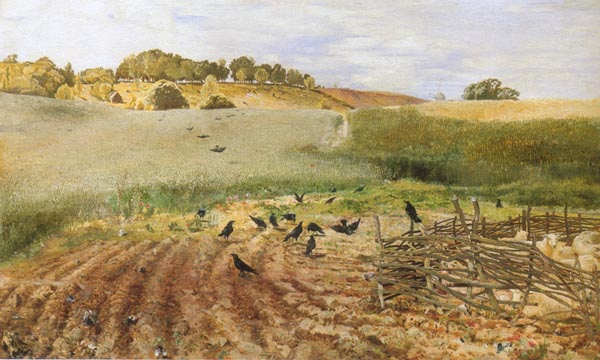
'The Rooks' Parliament' or 'The Crops Green' 1858.

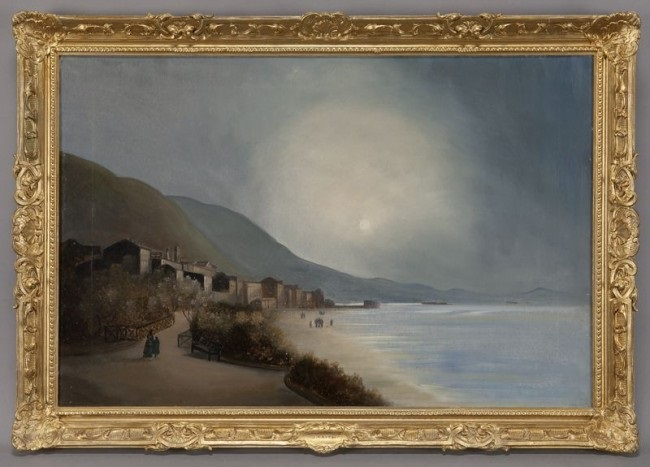
'Summer Evening' 1870

A collection of his works was exhibited at the Burlington Fine Arts Club in 1878. Amongst his chief pictures were:

- Salmsey Church (his first picture, painted when he was sixteen years old)
- The Forest of Fontainebleau, 1853
- A Voice of Joy and Gladness, 1860
- The Skirts of a Mountain Farm, 1862
- Midsummer Moonlight, 1866
- The Crops Green, 1867
- The Shadow of Snowden, 1867
- Summer Evening, 1870
- A Hampshire Homestead, 1872
- The Heavens declare the Glory of God, 1876
- Barff and Lord's Seat from the Slopes of Skiddaw, 1877

The Dictionary of National Biography, 1900, summarised his catalogue as "chiefly in oils, but occasionally also in water-colours, and … many fine studies in black and white", noting works above and,

- 'Lago Maggiore from Stresa,' 1871;
- 'Fresh fallen Snow on the Matterhorn,' 1872;
- 'The lesser Light to rule the Night,' 1873;
- 'Twilight in the Wood' (engraved by C. Cousen for the 'Art Journal,’ 1874);
