= Artspace, New Haven =

Contemporary art gallery in New Haven, Connecticut, U.S.

Coordinates: 41°18′15.6″N 72°55′30.9″W

Artspace
- Founded: 1987
- Type: Exhibition
- Purpose: visual art
- Website: artspacenewhaven.org

Artspace (founded 1987) was a contemporary art gallery and non-profit organization located in downtown New Haven, Connecticut. Artspace closed its physical location in June 2023 and announced plans to operate remotely.

== Teen program ==
Artspace hosted an annual Summer Apprenticeship Program (SAP) for high school students to work with a professional artist. In 2001, the program's founding year, Artspace partnered with artist Sol LeWitt to create a series of wall drawings.

Past SAP projects have included:

- 2001: Wall Drawings with Sol LeWitt
- 2002: On the Day I Was Born with David Pease
- 2003: View From Here with Lee Boronson
- 2005: Organic Bending with Shih-Chieh Huang
- 2008: Hawaii with William Downs
- 2009: Babel Collections with Carolyn Salas
- 2011: Trellised Bench with Boris Chesakov and Ryan Wolfe

== The Lot ==
The Lot is Artspace's pocket park and public art space. It is located near Artspace at 812 Chapel Street, the site of a busy bus stop. Artspace has presented temporary art installations here since 1999, and redeveloped it as a dedicated art space in 2005 in collaboration with local and federal agencies.

=== Early history ===
The Lot began as an empty lot. It was formerly the site of the Phoenix Building, which was torn down in the late 1990s because of safety concerns, leaving a rubble-filled lot.

In 1999, Marianne Bernstein of Artspace's Visual Arts Committee, asked Mayor John DeStefano for permission and organized the inaugural project in the Lot, "New Haven Labyrinth." A team of local artists led by Sharon Kurland created a maze, inspired by a Cretan labyrinth, made out of local river rocks painted by over 2500 local residents.

=== Renovations ===
In 2001, a community charrette focused on the Lot was organized by Artspace, the International Festival of Arts and Ideas and Project for Public Spaces. There, artists and neighborhood residents developed ideas for renovating the site, including plantings, pathways, benches, and a new bus shelter. The design, anchored by benches of stone recycled from the Phoenix Building, was honored by the American Society of Landscape Architects.

=== Exhibitions ===
Exhibitions at the Lot included:

- Deborah Hesse (curator): Line (2001), a large group sculpture show
- Christopher Fennell: Tree Dome (2005–2006), a contemplative space made of foraged lumber
- DeWitt Godfrey: Pamplona (2006), one of three projects in Public Art Moving Site, giant rusty loops of sheet metal filling the Lot's Orange Street gateway
- Colin McMullan: A Lot in Our Lives (2007), interactive sculptures including outdoor libraries for books and objects This exhibition was home to McMullan's first Corner Library, a project which is ongoing at various locations in New York City.
- William Lamson: Long Shot (2009–2010), basketball court of massive proportions
