= DeWitt Godfrey =

American sculptor

Untitled welded steel sculpture by DeWitt Godfrey, 1989, Museum of Fine Arts, Houston

DeWitt Godfrey (born 1960) is an American sculptor, best known for his large abstract constructions of banded steel installed in public sites. Godfrey was born in Houston, Texas, and raised in Kalamazoo, Michigan; he earned a B.A. in art from Yale University in 1982 and an M.F.A. in sculpture from the Edinburgh College of Art as a Fulbright Scholar in 1996. Godfrey is the recipient of numerous awards and fellowships, including the National Endowment for the Arts, the Henry Luce Foundation, the New York Foundation for the Arts and the Japan Foundation, among others. From 2008 to 2016 he served on the board of the College Art Association and was formerly the director of the Institute for Creative and Performing Arts at Colgate University, where he is a professor in the Department of Art and Art History. He lives in Central New York and New Orleans.

Godfrey was elected president of the CAA board of directors for a two-year term, beginning May 2014
