= Holland Cotter =

American art critic (born 1947)

- Born: 1947 (age 78–79); Connecticut, U.S.
- Education: Harvard College; City University of New York; Columbia University
- Occupations: Writer and art critic
- Employer: The New York Times
- Awards: Pulitzer Prize for Criticism

Holland Cotter (born 1947), is an American writer and co-chief art critic of The New York Times. In 2009, he won the Pulitzer Prize for Criticism.

== Life and work ==
Cotter was born in Connecticut and grew up in Boston, Massachusetts. He earned his A.B. degree in 1970 from Harvard College, where he studied English literature under poet Robert Lowell and was an editor of The Harvard Advocate. His first art course was an anthropology course on primitive art, which led to his first of many visits to Harvard's Peabody Museum of Archaeology and Ethnology.

Cotter earned an MA in American modernism from the City University of New York and an M.Phil in early Indian Buddhist art from Columbia University, where he also taught Indian art and Islamic art. He has been a writer and editor for the New York Arts Journal, Art in America, and Art News.

Cotter was a freelance writer for The New York Times from 1992 to 1997, before being hired as a full-time art critic in 1998. Hired for his expertise in Asian art, he has been credited with exposing contemporary Indian and Chinese art to a Western audience. In 2009, he won the Pulitzer Prize for Criticism. Among his Pulitzer-winning pieces were ones written as a result of a trip to China prompted by the 2008 Summer Olympics, including an examination of the Chinese museum scene and an account of art at the Mogao Caves near Dunhuang.
