= Recess Activities =

Nonprofit artist exhibition in Brooklyn, New York

Recess Art is a publicly accessible nonprofit artist work and exhibition space located in a street-level storefront at 46 Washington Avenue in Clinton Hill, Brooklyn, New York City, United States.

Free of charge and open to the public, Recess facilitates everyday interactions between artists and the community in order to promote the productive space of the working artist as a site of valuable visual and intellectual interactions.

== History ==
Recess was formed in May 2009 to address concerns that emerging artists cannot afford to live or work in proximity to exhibition communities.

Recess "functions neither exclusively as a gallery nor a studio space, but instead gives artists the ability to set the terms of their work in a store-front location that is open to the public. The nature of this setting creates a shared space for artists, viewers, and the work."

== Artists in Session ==
Once a year, Recess has an open call for applications for artists interested in Recess's artist in residence program, Session. Session artists receive a materials stipend and two to three months to use Recess as a work and exhibition space.

In an interview with Fractured Atlas Recess's founding director, Allison Weisberg said, "Recess resident [artists] can take risks and experiment in our non-traditional space while gaining visibility in SoHo's “traditional” exhibition community. Recess artists are given ample space, within which they can choose to create large-scale, process-based and/or site-specific work, and a stipend with which to purchase project materials."

== Session artists ==
- Leila Hekmat (November 8 - December 22, 2011)
- FCKLNZ (Red Hook) (October 1 - December 10, 2011)
- galería perdida (August 17 - October 22, 2011)
- Jonathan Durham (In Session at Red Hook) (July 5 - September 10, 2011)
- Larry Bob Phillips (June 18 - August 6, 2011)
- Jeff Williams (April 13 - June 11, 2011)
- Lior Shvil (In Session at the Red Hook location) (January 31 - April 25, 2011)
- Scott Keightley (January 12 – March 26, 2011)
- A.K. Burns & Katherine Hubbard (October 13 – December 11, 2010)
- Abigail DeVille (September 8 – October 9, 2010)
- Deville Cohen (September 8 – October 9, 2010)
- Siebren Versteeg and David Hardy (July 7 – September 2, 2010)
- Kara Hearn (March 27 – June 12, 2010)
- Bruce High Quality Foundation (January 13 – March 20, 2010)
- Corin Hewitt & Molly McFadden (September 23 – November 28, 2009)

== Be Black Baby at Recess ==
Be Black Baby: A House Party Presents is a series organized by Simone Leigh. Recess hosted the inaugural series on March 13, 2010. This first evening of performance responded to Brian DePalma's film Hi, Mom! (1970). Taking the film as a point of departure, the series continues to challenge traditional identity politics and question modes of cultural appropriation.

The second event in the Be Black Baby series took place on September 10, 2010, and was co-organized by Uri McMillan. The evening featured performances and live tableaux reinterpreting the inaugural Michael Jackson academic conference McMillan organized for Yale University in 2004. McMillan invited artists, intellectuals and performers to respond to Jackson's larger-than-life persona.
