= Young Painters of the World =

Young Painters of the World (French: Jeunes Peintres du Monde) was a one-month long residency program which was organized by International Association of Art and supported by UNESCO to promote interchange between young artists from all over the world and improve their social status. The first program was held in Paris from October 2 to 28 in 1961 by the French National Committee of IAA. A selected young artist under age of 30 as a representative of his or her country had the qualification for participation. They were provided accommodation, meals and transportation during the program. Because lack of data, it is not clear yet how often the program was held by each national committee of IAA in rotation and until when it was managed in relation to UNESCO.

== Historical background ==
=== A UNESCO initiative, 1948 ===
The general conference of UNESCO at its third session, held in Beirut Lebanon during November in 1948, accepted the initiative of the freedom of artists. The director general Sir Julian Huxley was instructed:

IX. Resolutions Adopted on the Report of the Program and Budget Commission

1. The Program of UNESCO

6. Freedom of the Artist
- 6.151 to institute an examination, with the active participation of artists throughout the world, of the contributions which creative artists can make towards UNESCO's purposes;
- 6.152 to ascertain what social, economic and political influences now interfere with the performance of the artist's fusion; the measures that have been or can be taken to remove or lessen these hindrances; and the means whereby the working conditions of the artist can be improved and his freedom assured;
- 6.153 to present to the General Conference plans to carry out the resolutions on the freedom of the artist adopted by the First Session of the General Conference and reaffirmed by the Third Session.

Preparing for the International Conference of Artists, the director general Jaime Torres Bodet felt the need to consult member states about associations of arts in their own countries. He had an official enquiry letter(CL/497) sent to each member state on April 5, 1951 in order to ask:

(1) Do you consider the establishment of an International Association of Artists in the field of the visual arts to be desirable?

(2) Is there, to your knowledge, an International Association of Artists, even with a limited number of member countries, which has already asserted its authority in this field? If such an Association exists, would it be desirable to incorporate it in a larger and more representative Association?
(3) Should the members of the proposed International Association be national groups of artists, or private individuals, or both?
(4) What should be the main purposes and activities of this new International groups of artist, or private individuals, or both?

Based on the responses from 22 out of the 25 contacted countries and the secondary responses from 44 national associations of artists in 17 countries, the general conference of UNESCO at its Sixth Session, held in Paris during June and July 1951, adopted the following resolution:

Resolution 4.141

"The Director-General is authorized:

To carry out a preliminary enquiry concerning the possibility of establishing, in the field of the visual arts, an International Association of Artists to represent artists internationally and to associate them closely with UNESCO's work. The results of this enquiry shall be submitted to the General Conference at its Seventh Session, and Communicated to the First International Conference of Artists."

- In April 1951 when the work of preparing for the International Conference of Artists began, it has become clear that it would be necessary to consult national associations of artists. On 5 April 1951, the Director-General most representative associations of artists in the visual arts in their respective countries. The Secretariat received replies, with lists, from the following 25 countries: Australia, Austria, Belgium, Burma, Canada, Ceylon, Colombia, Cuba, Denmark, France, Greece, Guatemala, Haiti, India, Iraq, Italy, Mexico, Monaco, New Zealand, Norway, Switzerland, Thailand, United Kingdom, United States of America, Yugoslavia.
- A committee of Experts, which met in UNESCO House from 28 to 30 May 1951 to advise the Secretariat on arranging the International Conference of Artists, recommended the creation of an International Association of the Visual Arts.

=== The International Conference of Artists, 1952 ===
The first International Conference of Artists was held in Venice, Italy from September 22 to 28 in 1952. Its reports were supposedly submitted to the 7th General Conference of UNESCO in November of the same year but the copy of the report is not preserved at UNESCO archives. However, an anthology of essays and statements collected by UNESCO at that time was published under the title 《The Artist in Modern Society》 in 1954.

=== The International Association of Plastic Arts, 1954 ===
Right after the initial Conference in Venice, a preparatory committee was organized with a chairman Gino Severini. Finally, the 8th General Conference of UNESCO held in Montevideo of Uruguay in November 1954 admitted the International Association of Plastic Arts(French: Association Internationale des Arts Plastiques) as observers and decided on increasing its subvention for the association.

The establishment of the International Association of Art(French: l'Association Internationale des Arts Plastiques(IAA/AIAP) dates back to an initiative launched in 1948 in Beirut's Third General Conference of UNESCO to set up a permanent forum of international visual artists to support UNESCO's goals. The sixth UNESCO conference in 1951 commissioned its Secretary-General to convene an international congress of artists, which was finally held in Venice in 1952. The 23 national governments represented there and 48 artists' associations from 19 countries agreed on the goal of founding an international umbrella organization for sculptors, painters and engravers. Chaired by the Italian painter Gino Severini, a Transitional Council has been set up and a secretariat in Paris. Finally, in 1954, the founding assembly of the IAA / AIAP was held in Venice, attended by already formed national committees from 18 countries as full members, as well as observers from another 22 countries. Since then membership has grown to over 90 National Committees worldwide, divided into five world regions. Since its foundation, the IAA / AIAP has had the official status of a consultative organization of UNESCO.

== Young Painters of the World ==
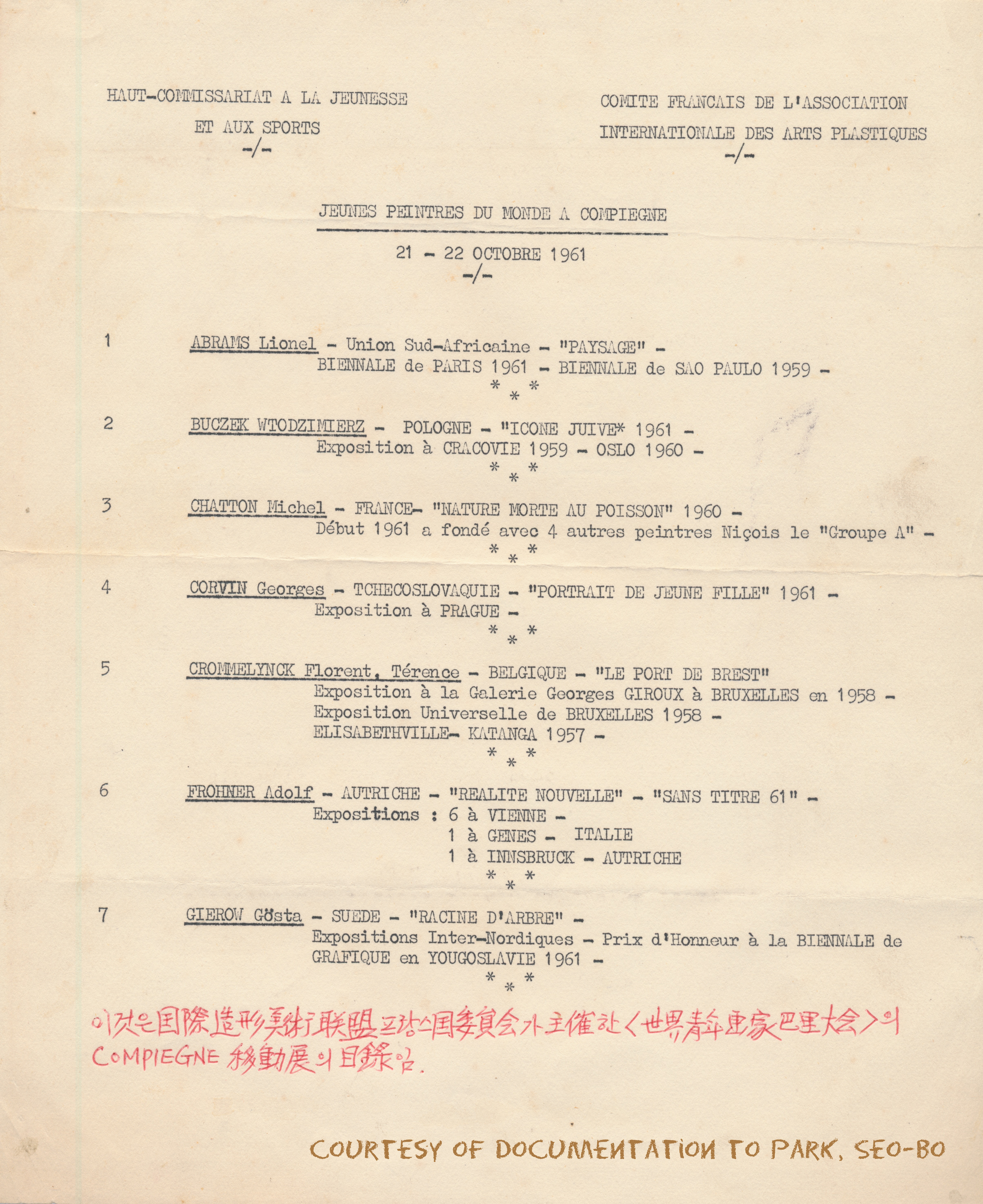
The 1st page of the brochure of the group exhibition of Young Painters of the World in Paris, which was held in Compiègne from October 22 to 23 in 1961.

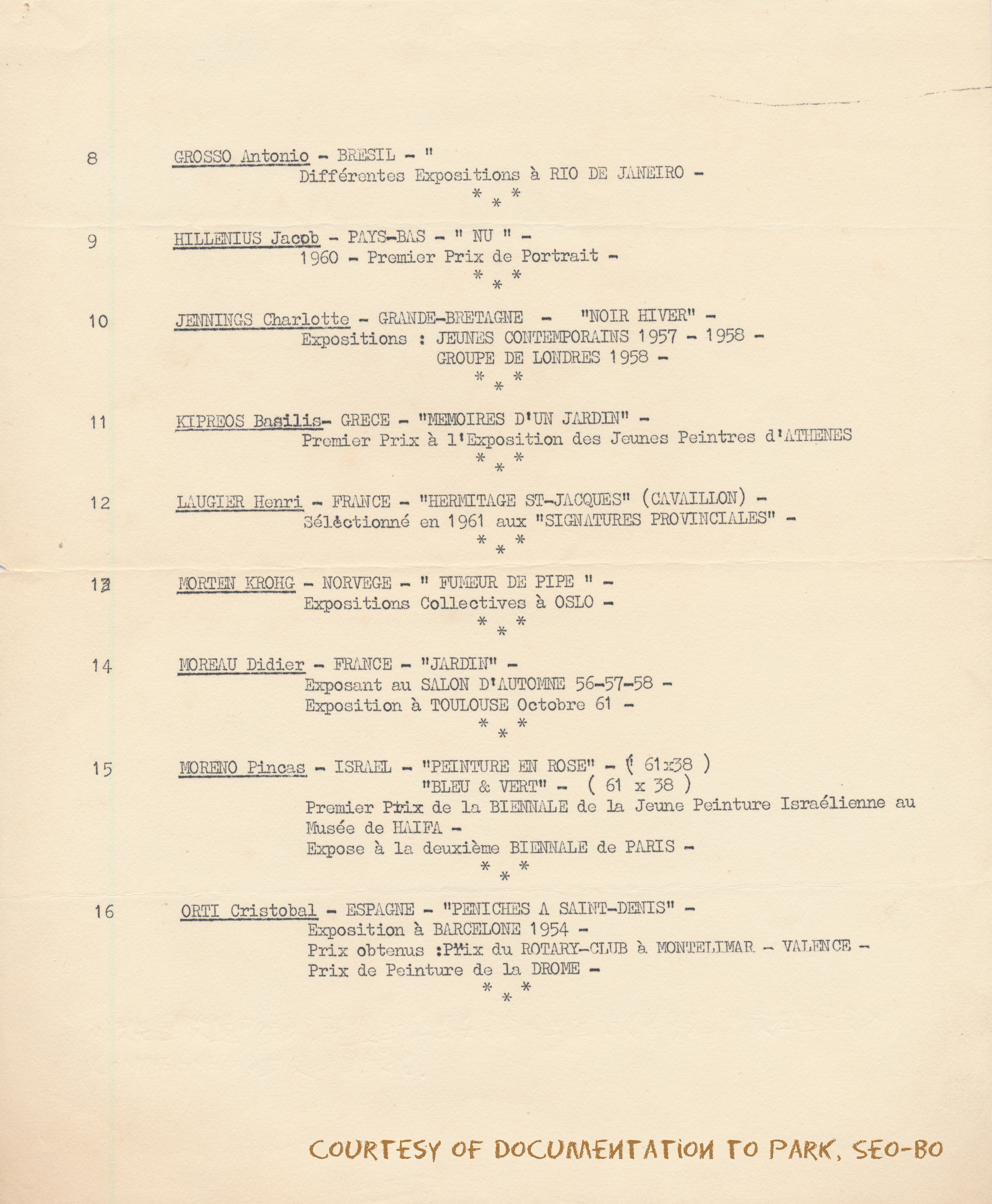
The 2nd page of the brochure

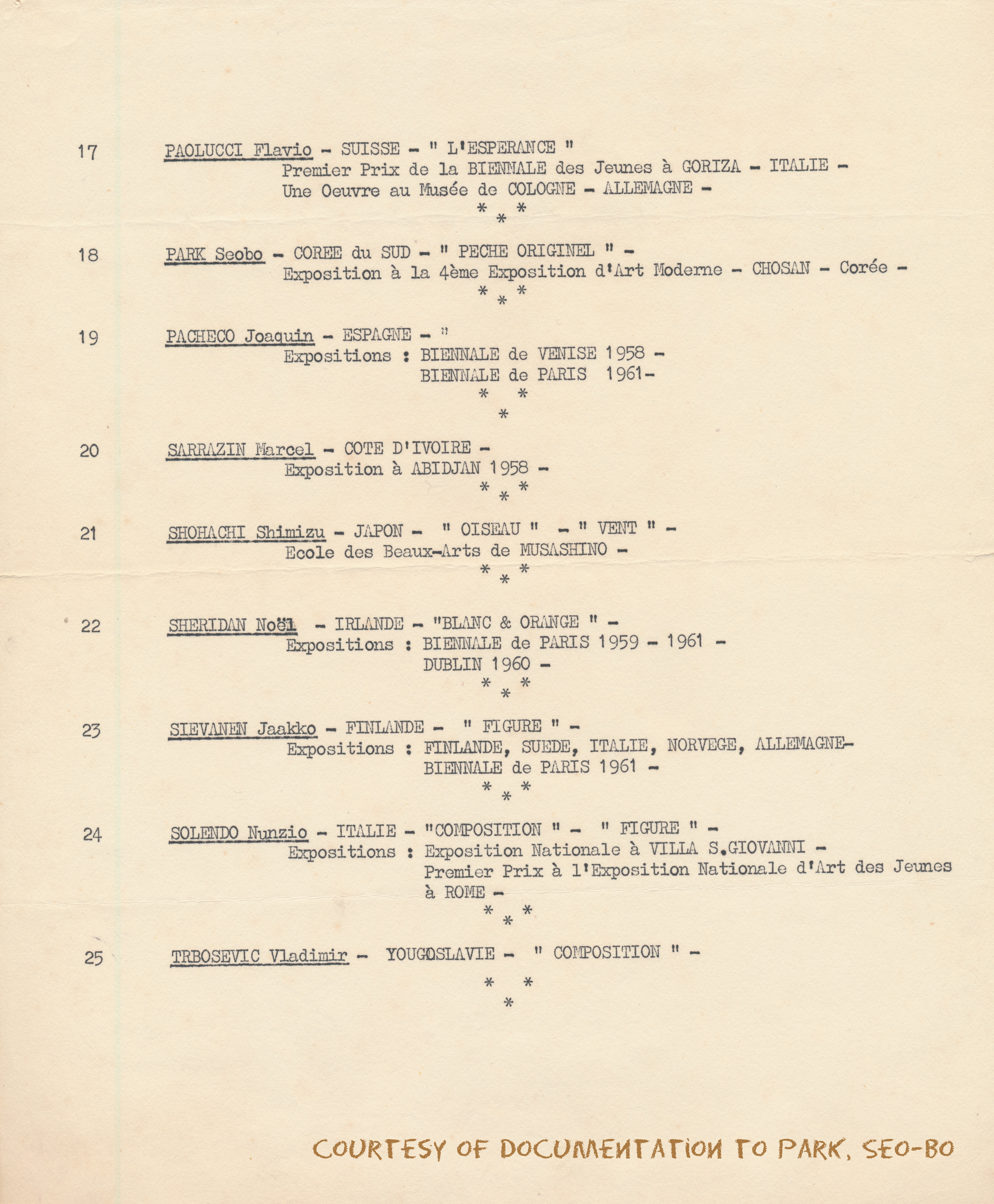
The 3rd page of the brochure

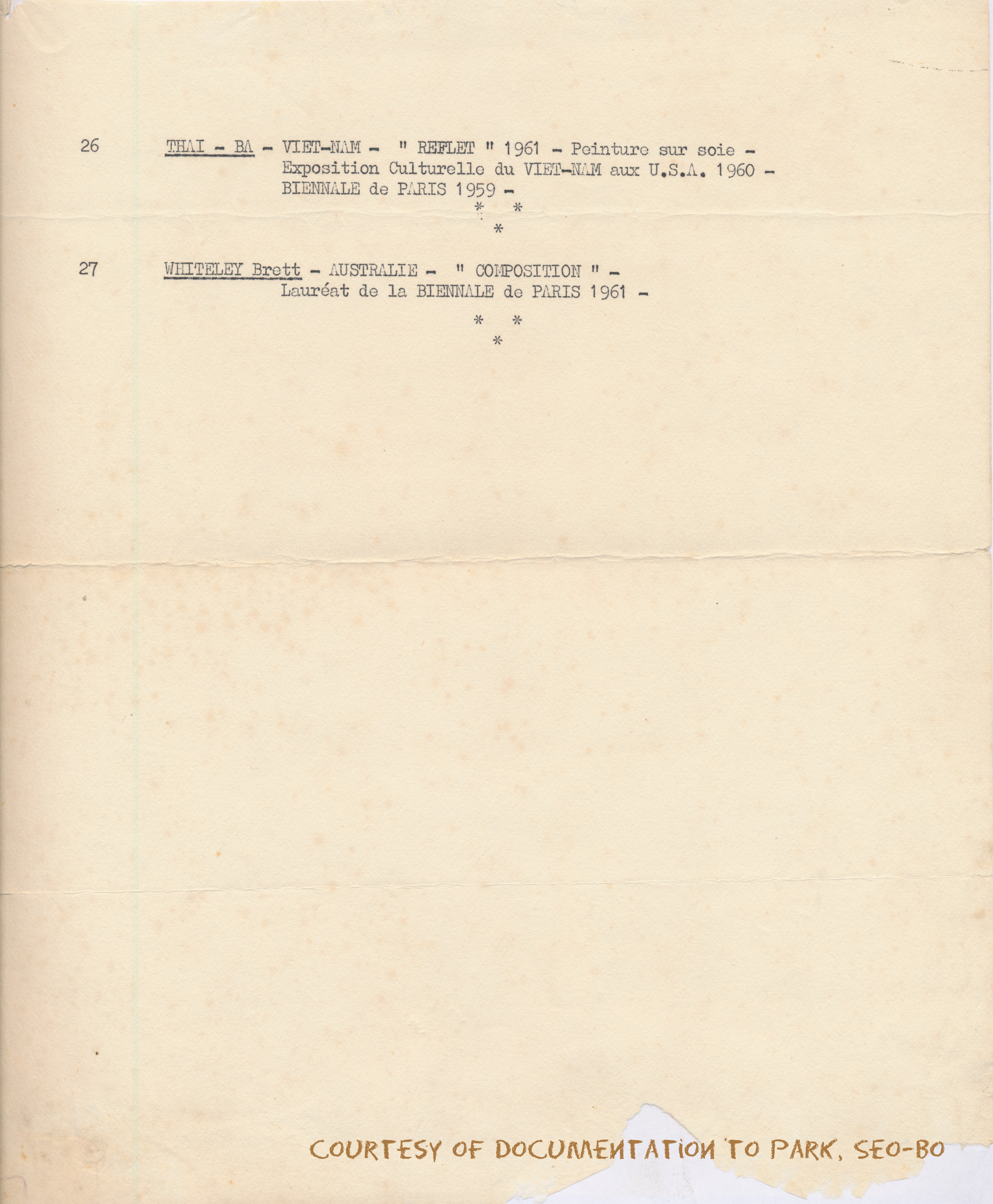
The last page of the brochure

Young Painters of the World was a sort of residency program for young artists under 30 age from member countries of UNESCO. It was supported by UNESCO and organized by each national committee of IAA/AIAP in terns. Because of the lack of archive material, it is not clear who brought up the idea first, and when and where it started. According to Park Seo-Bo who participated in Young Painters of the World in Paris in 1961, the 1961 one held by the French committee seems to have been the beginning. Based on his interview and the material he presented, it was almost a one-month long program which consists of workshop, tours, seminar, a group exhibition and an art contest among the participants. According to the private letter written in 1965 from Kim Tschang-yeul to Park Seo-bo, it is sure that another Young Painters of the World was organized by the U.K committee of IAA/AIAP and held in London in 1965.

=== Young Painters of the World in Paris, 1961 ===
It was announced to each national committee of IAA/AIAP in 1960 that Young Painters of the World in Paris(French: Jeunes Peintres du Monde à Paris) would run from January 2 to 28 in 1961. However, the French committee changed the date to hold it in parallel with the 2nd Paris Biennale(French: Biennale de Paris) scheduled to open on September 28 in the same year. The notice of was delivered in November by post to each national committee. It was scheduled again from October 2 to 28 in 1961. However, some countries didn't get the letter so that their representative artists arrived in Paris on January next year only to find themselves way ahead of the actual schedule. One of them was Park Seo-Bo, who had to wait for 10 months.

According to Park Seo-Bo's interview, there were some participants who could not speak French nor English like himself. Because translators were not provided, they didn't communicate fully even at conference but they shared the printed handouts of reports each participant was supposed to present either in French or English. They visited together the tomb of Vincent van Gogh at Auvers-sur-Oise on a tour bus and had a group show in Compiègne from October 21 to 22 during the program. The participants were told to submit into the contest two pieces of art work created on the subject of the emerging new town Sarcelles near Paris. Park Seo-Bo got the first prize for his landscape with oils, Flavio Paolucci from Switzerland got the second, and Adolf Frohner from Austria the third.

==== The participant countries and artists ====
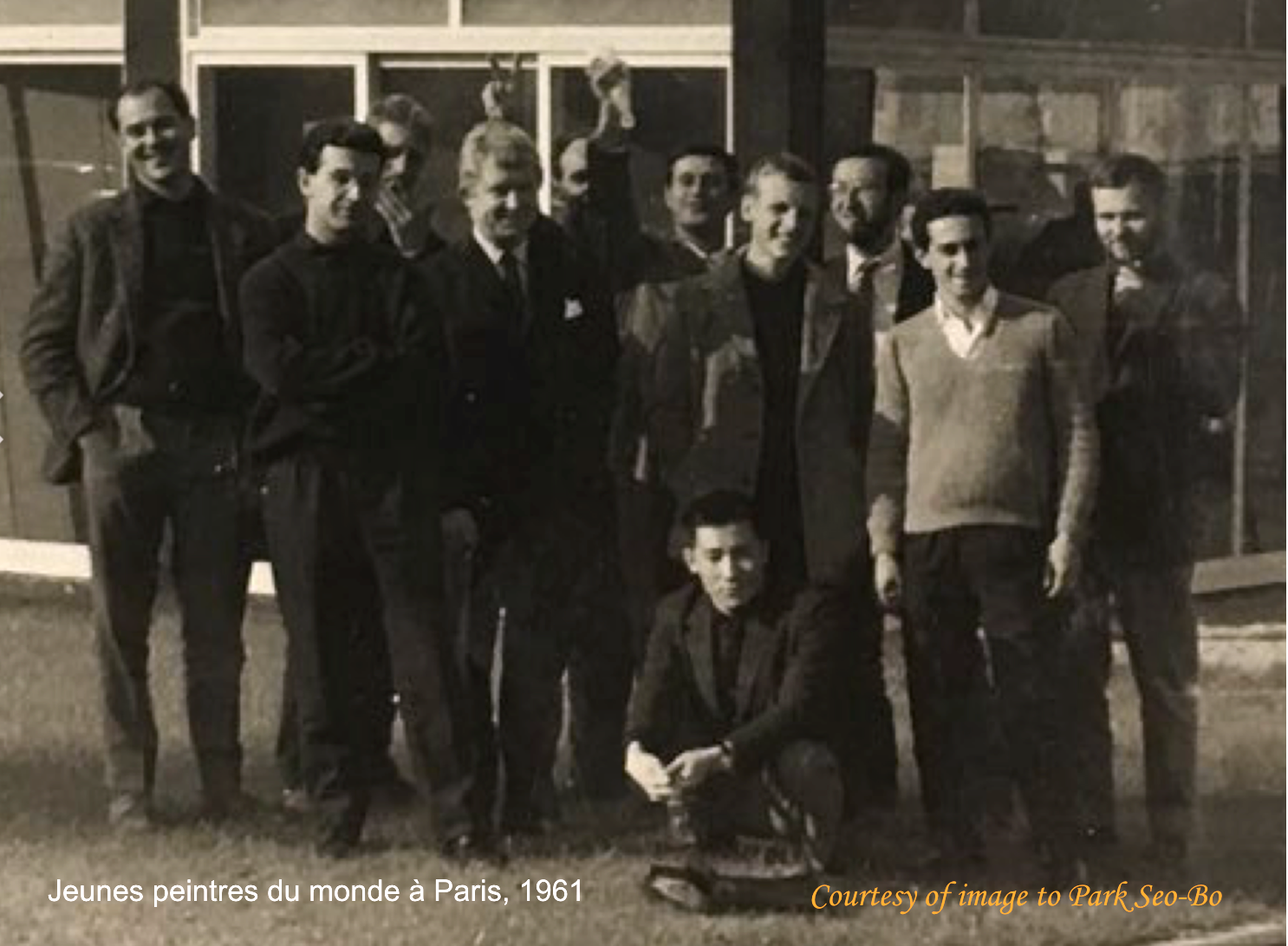
Some of the young artists participating in "Jeunes peintres du monde à Paris" in 1961

According to the brochure of the group exhibition in Compiègne which Park Seo-Bo has kept, at least 27 young artists from 24 member countries came to Paris to participate in the programme. There was only one female artist among the 27, who was the national representative of the U.K. It was the rule that each country sent one artist, but three artists represented France and two came from Spain. The youngest participant was the one from Australia, and there were some who were older than the age limit of 30.

COUNTRY	ARTIST	ART WORK
South Korea	Park Seo-Bo(1931~)	French: Péché originel
Japan	Shimizu Shohachi(Japanese: 清水昭八(1933~1996)	French: Oiseau & French: Vent
Vietnam	Thai-Ba Van(1934~1999)	French: Reflet
Australia	Brett Whiteley(1939~1992)	French: Composition
Brazil	Antônio Grosso(1935~2018)	?
South Africa	Lionel Abrams(1931~1997)	French: Paysage
Ivory Coast	Marcel Sarrazin(1928~1979)	?
Israel	Moreno Pincas(1936~?)	French: Peinture en rose & French: Bleu & vert
Poland	Wtodzimierz Buczek(1931~1986)	French: Icone juive
Yugoslavia	Vladimir Trbosevic(?~?)	French: Composition
Czechoslovakia	Georges Corvin(?~?)	French: Portrait de jeune fille
Belgium	Florent Térence Crommelynck(1932~)	French: Le port de Brest
Norway	Morten Krohg(1937~)	French: Fumeur de pipe
Finland	Jaakko Slevanen(?~?)	French: Figure
Sweden	Gösta Gierow(1931~2011)	French: Racine d'arbre
Netherlands	Jacob Hillenius(1934-1999)	French: Nu
United Kingdom	Charlotte Jennings(1935~)	French: Noir hiver
Republic of Ireland	Noel Sheridan (1936~2006)	French: Blanc & Orange
Switzerland	Flavio Paolucci(1934~)	French: L'Espérance
Austria	Adolf Frohner(1934~2007)	French: Réalité nouvelle & French: Sans titre 61
Greece	Basilis Kipreos(Vasilis Kypraios)(1936~)	French: Memoires d'un jardin
Italy	Nunzio Solendo(1937~)	French: Composition & French: Figure
Spain	Joaquín Pacheco(1934~?)	?
Spain	Christobal Ortí Centelles(1930~?)	French: Péniches a Saint-Denis
France	Michel Chatton(?~?)	French: Nature morte au poisson
France	Henri Laugier(1937~?)	French: Hermitage St-Jacques(Cavaillon)
France	Didier Moreau(1933~?)	French: Jardin

=== Young Painters of the World in London, 1965 ===
Another Young Painters of the World was organized by the U.K committee of IAA/AIAP and held in London in 1965. Kim Tschang-yeul was selected for that program as the Korean representative.
