= Kang Kuk-jin =

South Korean artist (1939–1992)

- 강국진
- Born: December 27, 1939; Daejung Dong, Jinju-si, Korea
- Died: 1992 (aged 52–53)
- Education: Hongik University; Konkuk University
- Known for: Performance art, printmaking
- Movement: Nonkkol Coterie; Shinjeon Dongin

Kang Kuk-jin (Korean: 강국진; 1939–1992) was an avant-garde Korean artist and founder of the Nonkkol Art Group. He made avant garde work primarily from the mid-60s to the early 70s and is known as the first happening and technology artist. Throughout his involvement in the Nonkkol Coterie, and other group activities ranging from The Union Exhibition of Korean Young Artists and New Exhibition (Shinjeon Group), he was a prolific experimentalist within a range of media and genres: happenings, object sculpture, multiples, neon, printmaking, and installations. During these group activities he was also involved in producing writing, lectures, and seminars about new forms of art. He participated in almost all of the first happenings in Korea between 1967 and 1968. After the mid-70s he focused on experimental printmaking and paintings, but always kept his focus on depicting the process of art making within his works. Kang was dedicated to capturing his own reality within his work and was not beholden to a certain lineage of style, medium, or subject matter. He saw his own life, the artist's life, as the main inspiration for and expression of art.

== Biography ==
Kang Kuk-jin was born in Daejung Dong, Jinju Si, Korea on December 27, 1939. His father studied commercial science at Tokyo Imperial University (now known as Tokyo University) and his mother was a graduate of Sook-myung Girl's High School. Both parents were very academically accomplished for their times. In 1944, Kang and his family moved to Busan. As he grew up amidst the Korean War, Kang's schooling was interrupted. Despite the war, his family was comparatively well-off since his father was in the successful business of tobacco, salt, and flour. From a young age Kang excelled in the arts and represented his school at the children's art festivals.

Kang attended Hongik University's Department of Western Painting and graduated in 1965. In 1973 he opened the first printmaking workshop in Korea and taught classes. From 1973 to 1987 he served as a lecturer at Hongik University, Chugye University of Arts, Mokwon University, and Konkuk University. Kang took a tour of Paris and New York's art scene in 1978–1979. In 1983, he graduated from Konkuk University's Graduate School with a major in Art Education. From 1980 until his untimely death in 1992 he was a professor at Hansung University.

Other professional positions he held include the following: advisor of Korean Performing Arts Association (1987–1992), committee member for numerous exhibitions and the Korean-French Art Association, director of Korean Art Association; chairman of Western Painting Division (1980–1982), judge of the Print Division in the Korean Art Competition, chairman of Hansung University Faculty Council (1991–1992).

== Group activities & early experimental works ==
=== Nonkkol Coterie ===
Nonkkol Coterie served as the basis of Kang's experimental attitudes because it bolstered his relentless pursuit of new artistic modes of expression and new systems of creating/showing work. The name Nonkkol was derived from the name of a quiet village in Hong Jae-dong that was covered in rice fields. After graduating in 1965, Kang launched the collective with his Hongik University colleagues Kim In-hwan, Nam Young-hee, Yang Cheol-mo, Chung Chan-sung, Dae-shin Choi, Han Young-seop. This group of artists had worked together since 1962 to establish a joint-studio system where they shared a space to work and live together. The group held their first exhibition in their founding year and also published a magazine titled Nonkkol Art. Critic Yoo Jin-sang wrote the exhibition text for the Nonkkol Coterie Exhibition. Nonkkol Art publication included the following articles by artists and critics: “The significance of forming a new generation” by Lee Kyung-sung, “Korean Contemporary Present” by Park Seo-bo, “Conclusion and Starting Point of Creation” by Yoo Jin-sang, “Concrete Abstraction” by Kim Dong-ri, “Maju’s Aesthetic Sovereignty” by Moon Duk-soo, and “The Formative Ideology of the New Generation” by Oh Gwang-su. Under the section titled “Our Words” a discussion between 7 members of Nokkol about their sentiments about ideas advocated by young artists who experience the Korean war, how to address issues in the art world caused by Informel art and the previous traditional generation, how to channel spirit of the April 19 Revolution and make it spread through social participation, personal and social issues, Pros and cons of contests as a gateway to beginning an artist, the duality of aspirations and despair of prospective artist who enter the field after graduation, how there are More arts programs but administrative issues are still rampant, having to self exhibit if not chosen by curators. The ending table of content, written by Han Myung-hee described how the group had been working and living together in 5 different spaces since 1962. Nonkkol moved studio to studio due to poor economic situations, but they took responsibility with their meager means as young student graduates. Critic Oh Kwang-su was familiar with them and expressed how the group's system of living and producing work together wasn't out of a youthful reckless abandon, but out of a fierce awareness of the commitment to building solidarity around their artistic ideologies. In a later edition of Nonkkol Art, Kang's take on early abstract art was expressed in his article “Words In My Artwork.” The group was active until 1967 and reinforced Kang's interest in building faith in his own experimental attitude towards art beyond tradition or conformity.

=== Shinjeon Dongin ===
In 1967, Kang Kuk-jin created New Exhibition Group (신전공인; Shinjeon Dongin) with Chung Chan-Sung, Jung Kang-ja and others. In 1968, Kang Guk-jin enacted Plastic Bag Spewing Colorful Water held in the music room called Cesibong, Transparent Balloons and Nude was also held in the same music room in the same year, and Murder on the Han River was held on the sandy beach along the Han River in October. He is known to have been directly involved in the planning and enaction of these pieces. At this time, the people who acted with him were Chung Chan-seung and Jung Kang-ja. In other words, he participated in almost all of the happenings that were first attempted in Korea between 1967 and 1968. As their actions were the first of their kind in the Korean art world, Kang Kuk-jin held seminars or lectures at the same time as each performance. Simultaneously with the presentation of the new performance, work conceptual and theoretical research was conducted.

The performance Transparent Balloons and Nude was held on May 30, 1968, from 6 to 10 p.m. at the Cesibong Music Room located at the Koreana Hotel in Gwanghwamun. Critic Yoo Jin-sang gave a lecture preceding the event titled “How to Appreciate Contemporary Art.” After the lecture, the participating artists presented the performance Transparent Balloon and Nude under the label of “Environmental Art and Joint Realization.” With John Cage music playing and lights shining, a man tore off Jung Kang-ja's clothes. Then spectators blew up balloons using a straw and chemical paste in order to place them on the naked body of Jung Kang-ja. After attaching the sticky balloons to the model's body male participants pressed their bodies against the balloons to pop them. Shinjeon Group saw the female body as the object and subject of their work. Korea in the 1960s heavily policed women's bodies through social and political oppression.

As can be seen from the title of Yoo's lecture, the performance Transparent Balloon and Nude highlights the issue of the audience's level of appreciation. Spectator's became active participant's and actors in the happenning. Audience participation and experience invariably made up the happening itself. This exploration of the shifting audience relationship to art was continued from the “Night of Contemporary Art and Happenings” which occurred 20 days before Transparent Balloons and Nude.

Kang Guk-jin's notes from the time of his work on Ornamentation: The Joy of Visuality, Ornamentation: Today's View, and Ornamentation: Today (December 11, 1967), expressed the uncertainty and curiosity that is present in the artist and audience when a new form of art is first introduced. He was interested in exploring ontological issues regarding his own questions and uncertainty about how new forms of art can possibly be received and understood by audiences. He was attuned to the unstable nature of meaning that changes day to day depending on one's lived experiences. Like the title of the work Embellishment: Today’s Perspective and Embellishment: Today, the author actively expressed his current thoughts and sensations that arose at the moment of creation. By creating art of the moment, he captured the momentary impulses of his creative acts, without knowing fully how it will turn out or be received.

=== Union exhibition of young Korean artists ===
Kang Kuk-jin showcased his event art in earnest at the Union Exhibition of Young Korean Artists held from December 11–16, 1967. He submitted Ornamentation: The Pleasure of Vision, Ornamentation: Today's Vision, Ornamentation: Today, and Plastic Bag Spewing Colorful Water.

On the opening day of the exhibition, Kang staged an event piece called Plastic Bag Spewing Colorful Water; wherein plastic tubes hanging from the ceiling dripped colored water that blended into each other mid-air. Kang Kuk-jin initiated the event by swaying the tubes into motion, but he made it a point to show the uncontrollable, unstoppable nature of the tubes following his action. The limits of the human agent in this presentation made an interesting commentary on the uncontrollable, erratic nature of creativity and expression. Due to the nature of paint mixing mid-air on the x, y, and z axes art historian Kim Mi-kyeong aptly described the piece as a “3-dimensional painting.” Another way to look at this event is through the lens of abstract action painting.

Ornamentation: The Pleasure of Vision was made of ready-made penicillin bottles placed on top of a dressing table that had a large mirror erected on top of it. The bottles were various colors and could be presented in various ways, such as stacking them or laying them down. Randomness allowed the arrangement to be changed each time it was installed. This object art installation highlighted his interest in the use of industrial materials that were becoming more prevalent in Korean society and his execution of interactive multiples. In Ornamentation: The Pleasure of Vision and Plastic Bag Spewing Colorful Water; wherein, the finished “work” is never complete, but rather an ongoing process that transformed the orderly exhibition hall into an entropic space. The relativity of seeing, the parallax perspective, can appear differently depending on the viewer's position, and is exemplary of Kang's post-modernist tendency. Ornamentation: Today's Vision and Ornamentation: Today were made out of plastic bags that were hung from the ceiling in a similar fashion to Ornamentation: The Pleasure of Vision. The former piece had a simple eye shape painted on the outside of the hanging plastic bag while the latter simply had a single vertical line painted on it.

In addition, Kang participated in the “street demonstration” held before the opening ceremony on the first day of the exhibition to protest against the stagnation of established art institutions. These new forms of artistic expression were made as a reaction against the painting system. On December 14, three days after the opening of the exhibition, about 10 Mu Group and Shinjeon artists held a collective event, Happening with Plastic Umbrellas and Candles. The script that dictated the actions of the performers was written by art critic Oh Gwang-soo and was enacted by Kang Kuk-jin, Chung Chan-seung, Kim Young-ja, Jung Kang-ja, Shim Seon-hee, Kim In-hwan, among others.

Starting in 1968, the following year, he began experimenting with happenings and media formats in more earnest. At 7 p.m. on Thursday, May 2, 1968, “A Night of Modern Art and Happenings” (Plate 4) was planned, and Plastic Bag Spewing Colorful Water that was shown at the Korean Young Artists Association Exhibition was carried out again. As can be seen from the overall event title of “A Night of Modern Art and Happenings,” the artists gathered at this time mainly belonged to the group of artists who actively participated in Happening with Plastic Umbrellas and Candles. Before Kang Kuk Jin's Plastic Bag Spewing Colorful Water event began, a seminar by critic Oh Kwang-soo was held. The topic of this day's seminar included the correlation between modern art and happenings. In 1968, Kang also presented Vision I and Vision II, a pair of red and blue neon light sculptures held up by a stainless steel frame and inspired by modern city lights.

== Later work ==
=== Printmaking ===
In the early to mid-1970s, Kukjin Kang's passion for experimental art evolved on the 2-D plane during his exploration of printmaking wherein he taught himself diverse printmaking techniques such as woodcut, etching, mezzotint and lithography. He made about 250 prints, all of which are abstract in nature. He made artworks on a two-dimensional plane by layering Korean traditional paper, hanji, produced prints using materials like aluminum cooking foil, pressed physical objects like LP records onto sheets of paper, and produced printings with no edition. In other words, Kang dynamically developed various experiments that would later become the concept and mode of contemporary printmaking. When Kang initially started printing, his work highlighted a “machine-finished” effect. After he mastered printmaking techniques, however, he went on to produce “hand-finished” effects. Kang's printmaking can be seen as an extension of his performances as it progressed from machine-created to more hand-crafted. In this vein, Kang's abstract printmaking shifted from the more objective finish of machinery to highlighting the performative gestures of his subjective, hand-made effects.

During the 50s and 60s, printmaking was seen as a new technology, but for Kang it is apparent that he saw it as another medium of experimental expression. He pioneered the first private print-making school in Korea in Hapjeong-dong, Mapo-gu, Seoul in 1971. His ever encounter with printmaking preceded his entrance into Hongik University's Department of Western Painting in 1961. He earned a living and saved for tuition by creating posters and advertisements using screen printing and etching. The main reason it took him 10 years to continue printmaking was due to the difficulty of getting printmaking materials and machinery. The experimental nature of his early prints can in part be attributed to the sheer fact that there was not as much quality printmaking materials available to him. From 1971 to 1975 he freely experimented with etching, copper mezzotint, lithograph, and monoprint. From 1975 to 1987 he began working on copperplate and lithography, focusing on the trace of the hand. With more high quality printmaking materials entering Korea during the late 80s, the quality of his prints became higher. This period is when he made his Light of History series and presented it in 1989. Light of History featured highly saturated primary colors and compositions that were split in half vertically or horizontally. The subject matter of this series included icons of nature of cultural objects, such as Buddha statues, while the background was filled with irregular triangles, squares, circles, or curved lines. Unlike his other series that focus on formalistic qualities like tone or movement, Light of History took on a narrative-like theme that depicts reality in playful ways. Other series that he had previously completed include Dots (1973–1975), Lines (1974–78), and Melodies (1976–87) which featured dark, roughly repeated lines that had varying lengths and thicknesses.

== Selected exhibitions ==
=== Selected retrospectives ===
2021	Hommage! Kang Kukjin / Between 'the Old' and 'the New' / Geumsan Gallery /Seoul
2020	Kang Kukjin Small Exhibition / Central Art Museum / Seoul
2019	Media, Abstract, Experiment: Transmediology / Surim Art Museum / Seoul
2018	Kang Kukjin, Kim Kulim Exhibition / La Bella Citta / Busan
2017	SPOON ART SHOW 2017 – Kang Kukjin Special Print Exhibition / KINTEX / Goyang
2017	Hommage! Kang kukjin – Memorable 25th year after the death / Keumsan Gallery / Seoul
2017	AHAF – Kang kukjin Special Exhibition / Grand Intercontinental Seoul Parnas Hotel / Seoul
2013	The Pioneer of Korea Experimental art – Kang kukjin Exhibition / Atrium Gallery (Gyeongnam Bank) / Masan
2007	The visiting Art Museum – Kang kukjin Exhibition / Art Center / Gimhae
	Light of History – Over the Barrier in Painting / Gyeongnam Art Museum / Changwon
1995	Kang kukjin's Painting feast – Memorable 3rd year after the death / Hangaram Art Museum / Seoul

=== Selected group shows ===
1983	Korea & French Art Association Exhibition / Dongduk Art Museum / Seoul
1982	Hansung University Art Professors' Exhibition / Baeksang Gallery / Seoul
1976~92	Seoul Method Exhibition / Seoul / Tokyo / Paris
1976-87	Our Land Exhibition / Seoul / Masan / Jinju
1974-78	Muhandae Exhibition / Art Institute / Seoul
1973~2005	6.1 Exhibition (Hongik University Colleagues exhibition) / Seoul Gallery / Seoul
1973~92	Korea Contemporary Printmaker Association Exhibition Art Center / Seoul
1965-67	Nonggol Dongin Exhibition / Shinmun Center / Seoul
