= Oan Kim =

French photographer and musician

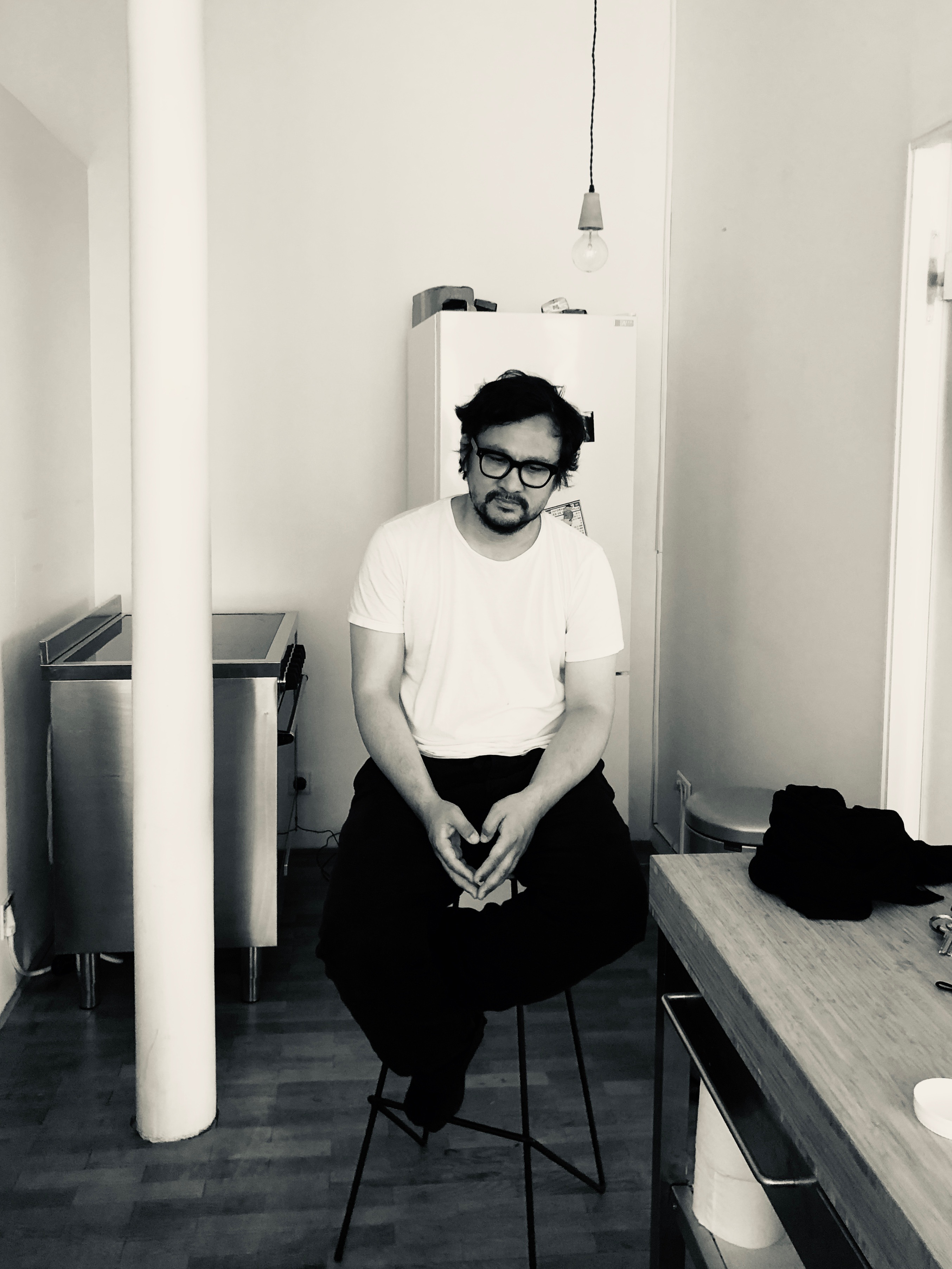

Oan Kim (born April 2, 1994) is a French photographer, video artist, and musician.

== Life and work ==
Oan Kim was born in Paris.

Over the years, Kim's photographic work has developed an approach to the medium that is neither strictly documentary, nor purely conceptual, re-questioning the balance of these elements with each new series he produces.

Kim has had more than a dozen gallery and museum solo exhibitions since 2000 in Paris, New York, Los Angeles, Seoul, and Macao, and has taken part in many group shows around the world.

In 2009, he published Je suis le chien Pitié by Actes Sud in collaboration with Laurent Gaudé. In 2018, he released Digital After Love with Actes Sud.

Kim has received several grants or commissions from CNAP, FIACRE, SCAM, and Macao Museum of Art. In 2018 he won the Prix Swiss Life from the Fondation Swiss Life for his work on the project Digital After-Love, que restera-t-il de nos amours ?.

He is the son of French-Korean painter Kim Tschang Yeul.

His photographic work is currently represented by Agence Myop. He studied photography at the École nationale supérieure des Beaux-Arts followed by musical composition at the Conservatoire National Supérieur de Musique et de Danse de Paris (CNSMDP). His musical projects are represented by ARTWORK RECORDS/PIAS.

== Publications ==
- Digital After Love, prix SwissLife à 4 mains, Actes Sud, a collaboration with musician Ruppert Pupkin, 2019
- Je suis le chien Pitié, Editions Actes Sud, livre de photographie, avec un texte de Laurent Gaudé, 2009

== Music ==
- Rebirth of Innocence (Artwork/PIAS, 2024)
- Oan Kim and the Dirty Jazz (Artwork/PIAS, 2023)

== Films ==
- The Man Who Paints Waterdrops (2021) – Official Selection, Doc NYC; Official Selection, Hot Docs International Documentary Festival; Official Selection, DMZ Film Festival, South Korea; Official Selection, Doclisboa; Official Selection, DocsBarcelona; Official Selection, Tel Aviv International Documentary Film Festival; Silver Prize, 61st Krakow Documentary Film Festival

== Photo exhibitions ==
=== Solo exhibitions ===
- Kumho Museum of Art, Seoul, 2002
- Sungkok Art Museum, Seoul, 2003
- Macau Museum of Art, (with Frank Lei), Macao, 2006
- Rencontres d'Arles, programme du Méjan, Le Capitole, Arles, 2009
- Whanki Museum, Seoul, 2011
- WhiteBox, New York, 2011
- Nuits Photographiques, Bain de Foule, Prix du Festival, during Rencontres d'Arles, Arles, 2013
- Digital After Love, Cité de la Musique, Paris, 2018

=== Group exhibitions ===
- SAM, Peter Kim, Myung-Ok Han, Oan Kim: Art-cade, Galerie des Grands Bains Douches de la Plaine, Marseille, 2016. Commissariat: Michel Enrici
- Festival OVNi, Nice, 2019
- SINE DIE, Agence Myop, Chronique en images de la vie au temps du coronavirus, L'Obs, 2020
