= Lee Quede =

Korean artist (1913–1965)

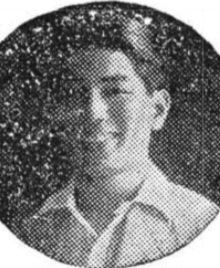
Lee Quede

Lee Quede (Korean: 이쾌대; Hanja: 李快大; 1913 – February 2, 1965), also known as Lee Qoede, Lee Kwae-dae, and Yi Kwae-dae., was a North Korean modernist painter, known for his figurative oil paintings. He was among the earliest adopters of modern Western style painting in Korea.

Toward the end of the Korean War Lee defected to North Korea, leading to the prohibition of his artwork in South Korea. In 1988, the South Korean government lifted the ban and allowed the exploration and study of his art.

== Early life ==
Lee Quede was born in 1913, on the eastern side of colonial Korea in Chilgok, Keishōhoku-dō. At an early age, Lee was inspired by his brother, Yeoseon, an art student at Rikkyo University in Japan, and his activism toward the social role of art in Korea within the colonial context. He studied painting under the artist Chang Bal. When Lee graduated from Whimoon High School, he went to Japan to study art at Teikoku Art School from 1933 to 1938, which is currently called Musashino Art University, and began learning art techniques based on Western still-life and figures. During his studies in Japan, Lee took part in the White Ox Society, a Korean art group in Japan that promoted national consciousness by using the ox as a metaphor of Korean agriculture. After their group was dismissed and rejected by the Japanese police, they changed their name to the Artists' Society in 1938 and continued their activities and exhibitions.

Following his graduation, he returned to Korea and in 1941, he founded the Joseon New Artist Association with Kim Jong-chan, Mun Hak-su, Kim Hak-jun, Jin Hu-an, Lee Jung-seop, and Choi Jae-deok. During this time art critic, Park Mun-won commented:

"The paintings by members of [Lee's] New Artists Association were decadent and escapist, but their resistance was more against the Choson Art Exhibition [organized by the Japanese colonial government], and underlying their work was the quest to seek and protect things that are truly Korean."

The majority of Lee's artwork were produced between 1930 and 1950, and he was considered one of the best figure painters of 1930s and 40s Korea.

In 1932, Lee's painting, Still Life, was selected to be shown at the 11th Joseon Art Exhibition. He also earned awards for his painting Dancer's Recess, Destiny, and Evening Picnic at the Japanese private art competition, Nikaten.

When Lee was 20, he married Yoo Gap-bong (also known as Ryu Kap-pong; 1914–1980), and she became the model for all the women he depicted in his artwork, which was particularly unusual for Korean artists for that period. He thought of his wife as his "muse" that invigorated his artistic inspiration.

Ideologically, Lee was heavily influenced by his brother, Lee Yeo-seong (born Lee Myeong-geon, 1901-?) who was a reporter, activist, painter, and author. Lee became a strong advocate for Korean independence, and after the separation of North and South Korea, he opposed the establishment of a South Korean government.

== In North Korea ==
In August 1946, After the Liberation of Korea from Japanese colonization, Lee visited North Korea and became the founder of the Leftist Alliance of Joseon Plastic Art. However, the heavily imposed of North Korean state propaganda made him leave the association. Instead, he chose a neutral pole and joined the Association of Joseon Art and Culture in 1947.

After his brother defected to North Korea in 1948, Lee was frequently harassed by South Korean authorities because of his ideological beliefs, and he was forced to create anti-communist artworks and posters.

In the period between Korean liberation and the Korean War, Lee was among the few artists who continued to produce artwork, and his work during this period "encapsulates his will to construct a new nation after overcoming chaotic social disorder".

During the Korean War, Lee was unable to leave Seoul due to his mother's illness and his wife's pregnancy, but he began producing paintings of North Korean leader, Kim Il Sung and Soviet ruler, Stalin. In late 1950, the South Korean Army arrested him and he was sent to the prisoner-of-war camp on Geojedo. Three years later, during a prisoner-of-war exchange, Lee decided to defect to North Korea, leaving his family behind in South Korea.

It is believed that while in North Korea, Lee continued painting but he disappeared from the art scene after his brother was purged. A North Korean news article later surfaced suggesting that Lee had remarried in the North, had two children, and died in 1965.

Renowned Korean artist, Kim Tschang-Yeul studied art under Lee's tutelage.

== Artwork ==
=== Paintings ===
Lee Quede is renowned for his figural paintings created between 1920 and 1940. According to the Daegu Art Museum, Lee depicted many self-portraits, of which four have survived.Self-Portrait in Traditional Coat is one of Lee's master paintings in 1930 which has a mixture of Western and Korean art styles. He is wearing durumagi, a traditional Korean garment, and a Western-style hat while holding an oil painting palette in one hand and traditional Korean brushes in the other. Lee portrays himself as a professional artist who confidently stares at the viewer. Even the dramatic brush strokes on his face are visible and add to Lee's settled look. Also, the colorful background of trees, the lake, and the blue sky represents an imagined space that Lee had in mind; it seems Lee created this painting to be separated from reality and be in harmony with the peaceful village.

After the Korean liberation from 35 years of Japanese colonial rule, Lee created the Group of People series, sizable oil paintings with large scales. Each series, has a sense of romanticism and political activism that reacts to the challenging time of the Japanese Colonial Period (1910-1945) or soon after they left. Group of People IV, represents dynamic movements and motions. In the top right of the painting, an explosion and chaos is seen. Two men are wrestling and fighting while one is biting the other. The sense of desperation is alive in the bottom right of the painting as there is a woman who is terrified and has her child hidden behind her back. However, on the left side, there are signs of hope and love; people are walking together toward something outside the painting. There is a man holding a woman's body and focusing on the direction people walk toward. According to Youngin Arial Kim, one of the writers of The Space Between: The Modern in Korean Art, the whole painting tells a story from right to left, where people have overcome fear and chaos and look forward to a better future. In her view, the painting shows Lee's hope that the newly liberated Korea would become a new nation that would rise from all the social conflict that was happening in the past course of history.

In his paintings, Lee often portrayed his wife as a model of inspiration and muse. In Portrait of Two People (1939), which received recognition from the Association of Korean Artists in Tokyo, Lee painted his wife, Yu Gabong, and himself hidden in her shadow. While he is looking in another direction, outside the painting, Yu Gabong directly gazes at the viewer. A similar setting is also visible in Couple Playing Cards (1930s), where both Yu Gabong and Lee are portrayed. However, in this painting, they both directly gaze at the viewer.

=== Drawings ===
Lee's drawings depict dynamic movements and leave strong impressions as they explore the figures' appearance, pose, and gestures. During the period he studied in Japan, Lee's interest in nude sketches and drawings began; he created most of his figure sketches, including a self-portrait which features a figure with a straight gaze toward the viewer. The Beggar painting is another example of Lee's interest in human anatomy and movement. Before the start of the Korean War in 1948, Lee, who was an art teacher at the Seongbuk Painting Research Institute by that time, painted a beggar wandering around the institute. Through strong marks, created by the brush's pressure, Lee highlighted the emotions and movement of the beggar's body. Even during Korean War, when Lee was imprisoned in the Geoje POW camp after arriving in South Korea, he started teaching artistic anatomy to his fellow prisoners, including Lee Ju-Yeong. He provided detailed explanations in his drawing notes of the human body's gestures, proportions, and movements. Much of his knowledge came from his memories of his studies at Teikoku Art School in Japan, where he learned from Professor Nishida Masaoki, whose knowledge of anatomy was based on French artistic anatomy from the 19th century.

=== Hyangtosaek ===
During the Japanese colonization period, Lee's paintings had been associated with the term hyangtosaek, which means "local color" and "return to land" in English. Hyangtosaek paintings presented pastoral and peaceful countryside scenes with exotic and traditional rituals. Art historians like Yeon, Shim Chung, the author of Vernacular Modernism in Modern Korea argues that hyangtosaek is a referred to the political use of Korean landscapes to evoke traditional customs and scenery of the countryside in pre colonial Korea; it ignores the bleak social realities of colonial Korea and provide the land with exotic and primitive characteristics. This term became a norm throughout Korean art and was encouraged and promoted by the Japanese colonial government in the Joseon Art Exhibition.

== Notable artworks ==
- Self-portrait in Traditional Coat
- People
- People 4 (circa 1948)
- Dahlia
- Horse
- Dancer's Recess (1930s)
- Destiny (1930s)
- Evening Picnic (1930s)
- Couple Playing Cards (late 1930s)
- Spring Maiden (late 1940s)

== Legacy ==
As the Korean War was coming to a close in 1953, Lee decided to defect to North Korea, leaving his wife and four children behind in South Korea. While it has been suggested that his choice was influenced by the government's restrictions on his art and political beliefs, the precise reasons for his decision remain inconclusive. Consequently, his name was censored and omitted from public discourse by the South Korean government. It was not until 1988 that the South Korean government lifted the ban on Lee's name, initiating the exploration and study of his artistic contributions. Although Lee Quede's work was banned, his family managed to keep his artwork in South Korea, which allowed his work to eventually receive acknowledgement and appreciation from the public eyes.

In 2015, the National Museum of Modern and Contemporary Art held an exhibition featuring approximately 400 works created by Lee during his time in South Korea, between 1930 and 1950. In addition, there are two full text books that contain all of Lee's drawings and notes. The books are over 48 pages with a table of content, starting from the body portions, human skeleton, and muscles, and ending with the head.
