= Noel Sheridan =

Irish visual artist (1936–2006)

- Born: Cecil Noel Sheridan; 12 December 1936; Dublin, Irish Free State
- Died: 12 July 2006 (aged 69); Perth, Western Australia, Australia
- Education: Trinity College, Dublin; Columbia University
- Known for: painting, acting
- Style: Landscape painting, abstract art
- Spouse: Liz Murphy
- Children: 5
- Parent(s): Cecil Brinsley Sheridan; Ann 'Nan' (née Doyle)
- Elected: Aosdána

Cecil Noel Sheridan (12 December 1936 – 12 July 2006) was an Irish painter, performance artist, installation artist and actor. He was a member of Aosdána, an elite Irish association of artists.

== Early life ==
Sheridan was born in Dublin in 1936. His father was Cecil Brinsley Sheridan, a noted comic actor and panto dame at the Olympia Theatre, Dublin. Noel attended Synge Street CBS and worked for the Irish Independent; he studied for a Bachelor of Communications at Trinity College at night, and began to perform with the Trinity Players.

== Career ==
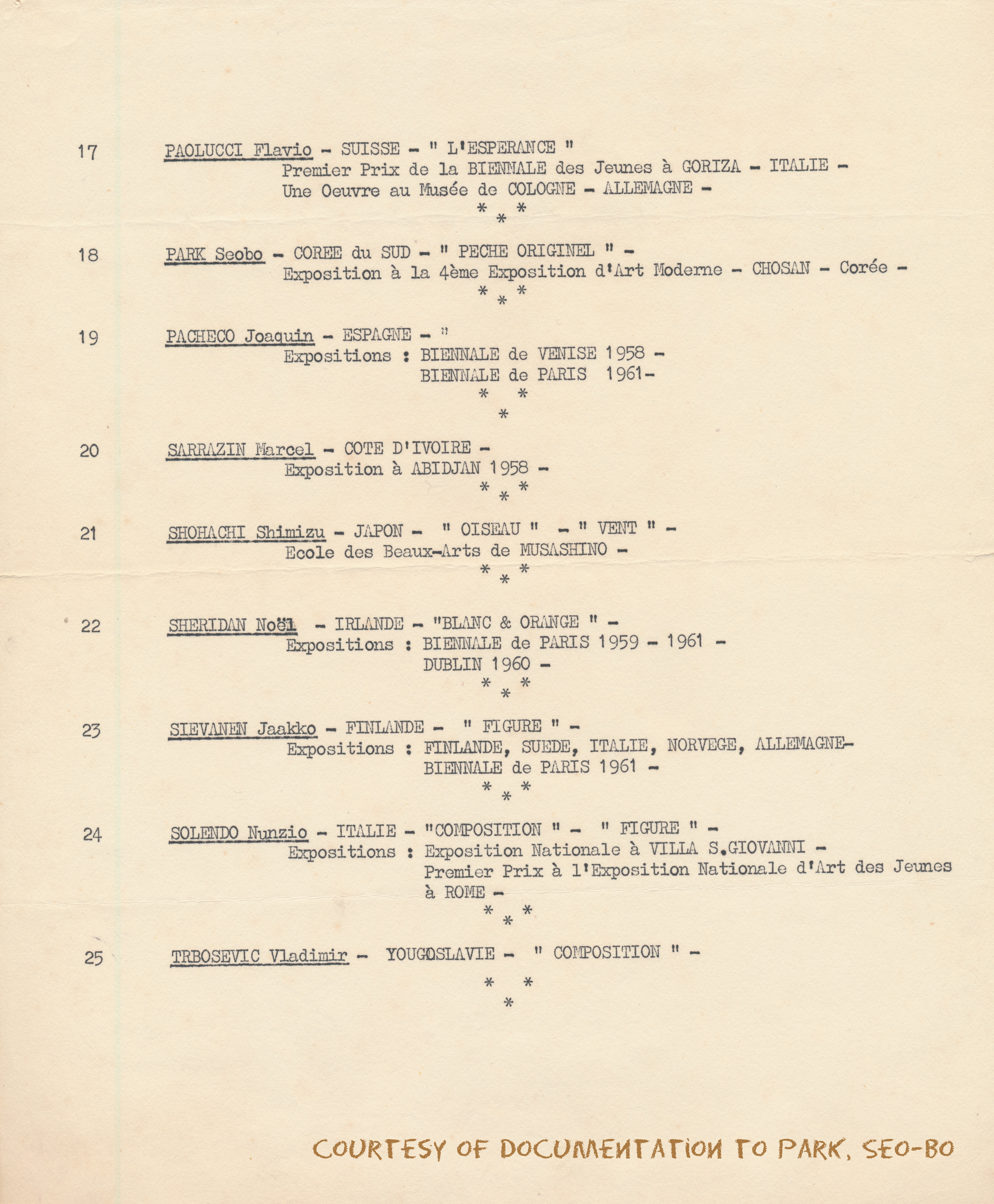
Page from the brochure of the Young Painters of the World residency programme, where Sheridan's work Blanc & Orange is listed.

He was also an amateur artist, painting abstract landscapes, his work appearing from 1958 in the annual exhibitions of Living Art and at the Paris Biennale in 1960; he represented Ireland at the 1962 UNESCO Convention of young painters in Paris and won the Carroll Prize for Painting in 1965 and 1969.

Sheridan worked as a gallery attendant in the Museum of Modern Art (New York), painting by night, and got a scholarship for Columbia University in 1967 for a masters in fine art.

He was from 1980 to 2002 director of the National College of Art and Design (NCAD, Dublin). He was also a committee member of Rosc and was elected to Aosdána.

Sheridan also worked in Australia for many years, as art critic on South Australia's Sunday Mail 1977–80 and as Director of the Experimental Art Foundation in Adelaide from 1975 to 1980 and won the emeritus medal of the Australia Council for the Arts in 1994.

== Personal life ==
Sheridan was married to Liz Murphy; they had 5 children. He died in 2006. Paul Durcan wrote a poem in his honour after his death.
