= Kim Tschang-yeul =

South Korean artist (1929–2021)

- Hangul: 김창열
- Hanja: 金昌烈
- RR: Gim Changyeol
- MR: Kim Ch'angyŏl

Kim Tschang-yeul (Korean: 김창열; Hanja: 金昌烈, 24 December 1929 – 5 January 2021) was a South Korean artist known for his abstract paintings of water droplets. He formed part of the Modern Artists' Association (현대미술가협회) in South Korea and joined the Art Informel movement of the 1950s and 60s. From the late 1960s, Kim Tschang-yeul presented works in international stages, studied in the United States, and eventually relocated to Paris in 1969, where he developed his signature water droplet paintings.

He is the father of French artist Oan Kim.

== Early life ==
Kim Tschang-yeul was born in Maengsan County, Heian'nan-dō, Korea, Empire of Japan in 1929. From the age of 5, Kim learned calligraphy from his grandfather and this experience later greatly impacted his artworks. He was also taught to sketch by his maternal uncle and decided to pursue a career as an artist. After his hometown was taken over by the Soviet Civil Administration in 1946, he was arrested for possession of an anti-communist pamphlet, and left high school before graduating. After being held for 10 days, he fled to Seoul, which was under US control, and lived in a refugee camp for a year.

== Art education ==
After leaving school, Kim Tschang-yeul moved to Seoul, where he entered various private painting studios. He first joined Gyeongseong Painting Studio (Gyeongseong Misul Yeon-guso, 경성미술연구소) in 1947 to train under sculptor Lee Guk-jeon (이국전, 李國銓, 1915-?), but when the studio closed down, he learned painting from Lee Quede (이쾌대, 李快大, 1913–1965) at Seongbuk Painting Studio (Seongbuk Hoehwa Yeon-guso, 성북회화연구소). Wanting to further his training, he enrolled in College of Fine Arts, Seoul National University, in 1948, but the onset of the Korean War in 1950 put a stop to his formal art education during his second year.

== Post-war activities in South Korea and Art Informel ==
As a result of the Korean War, Kim lost his sister, more than half of his classmates, and suffered from economic hardship for more than a decade.

Using his family's affiliation with the South Korean police force, Kim volunteered into the police force in 1951, and continued to work as a policeman until 1961. After serving in Jeju Island from 1952 to 1953, he was stationed in the Police Academy (경찰전문학교) in Seoul from 1953, where he worked as a librarian. During this time, he was able to indirectly experience contemporary European Art Informel movement through Japanese painting albums, magazines, and art books. Even while working in the force, he submitted poems, paintings, and illustrations to the Police Academy's magazine, Gyeongchal sinjo (경찰신조; 警察新潮).

Kim Tschang-yeul was also the founding member of Hyeondae Misulga Hyophoe (현대미술가협회, Contemporary Artists Association, 1957) that demanded reform of the conservative Korean art field and the government-hosted National Art Exhibition of Korea (대한민국미술전람회, 大韓民國美術展覽會, also referred to as Gukjeon, 국전). Rejecting what was considered a "feudal and premodern system ruled by conservative juries," the group experimented with European Art Informel and American Abstract Expressionism, and labelled their exhibitions as the "anti-National Art Exhibition of Korea." While such Western movements had been motivated by the collective trauma of World War II, Kim Tschang-yeul argued that the suffering young Korean artists' experienced during the Korean War transposed foreign modes of expression into a unique Korean context.

In the fourth Hyeondaejeon Exhibition (현대전) hosted by the Contemporary Artists Association in 1958, Kim exhibited his works alongside fellow members of the Contemporary Artists Association, such as Kim Seo-bong (김서봉, 金瑞鳳, 1930–2005) Kim Cheong-gwan (김청관, 金靑鱹, ?-?), Na Byeong-jae (나병재, 羅丙哉, ?-?), Lee Myeong-ui (이명의, 李明儀, 1925–2004), Lee Yang-no (이양노, 李亮魯, 1929–2006), Park Seo-bo (1931–), An Jae-hu (안재후, 安載厚, 1932–2006), Jang Seong-sun (장성순, 張成筍, 1927–2021), Jeon Sang-su (전상수, 田相秀, 1929-), Jo Dong-hun (조동훈, 趙東薰, ?~?), Ha In-du (하인두, 河麟斗, 1930-1989). The exhibition gained immense attention and was interpreted by art critic Bang Geun-taek (방근택, 方根澤, 1929–1992) as the collective emergence of Korean Art Informel.

Although Kim left the Korean art scene in the 1960s, he is still credited as forming part of the first generation of Korean Dansaekhwa artists, and has participated in various Dansaekhwa group exhibitions, both in South Korea and abroad.

== International art scene ==
After leaving the police force, Kim worked as a teacher at Seongru Art School (성루예고) and gradually turned to the international art scene. He continued to submit works to the second and third Paris Biennale in 1961 and 1963, and the São Paulo Biennale in 1965, and received a grant from the Rockefeller Foundation to study as a member of the Art Students League of New York from 1966 to 1968.

Kim Tschang-yeul was then able to participate in the Paris Avant Garde Festival with the help of Paik Nam June in 1969, after which he permanently relocated to Paris and married Frenchwoman Martine Gillon.

Kim Tschang-yeul's participation in the Salon de Mai in Paris, 1972, was the most critical turning point in his career. For this exhibition, he submitted the famous water droplet painting, Event of Night (Événement de la nuit, 1972), which gained critical acclaim.

For the rest of his career and life, Kim continued to produce series of water droplet paintings that incorporated "water droplets set against stark, neutral, monochromatic backgrounds in a way that conjoins figuration, hyperrealism, and abstraction."

The attention received from the water droplet paintings was a great reward after almost a decade of inconspicuousness in the French art field. In a 1974 letter to friend and fellow artist Park Seo-bo, Kim Tschang-yeul wrote: "I have not had a single show for the last 10 years, but now all of a sudden so many shows are scheduled."

Indeed, throughout the 1970s, Kim Tschang-yeul participated in numerous group exhibitions as well as holding solo shows, which continuously built up his recognition in Europe, America, Canada, and Japan, and his works were represented at prominent art fairs like Art Cologne and Art Basel.

In the 1980s, Kim Tschang-yeul engaged in several prominent types of water-drop series, including the Poem of 100 Characters (천자문) and Recurrence (회귀).

== Water droplet paintings ==
Critical analyses of Kim Tschang-yeul's paintings often refer to the subject of water droplets as multi-layered images of cleansing, purification, and "the evanescence of individual life." In deciphering the water droplet paintings, Biggs explains that the trompe l'oeil or ultra-realist painting technique used in Kim Tschang-yeul's works "is counter-balanced by his use of canvas (or newspaper) to represent itself" as the "strange cubist mixture of the real standing for itself and the painted standing for something else is complicated further in the works with Chinese characters, where the characters act as ground but the 'ground' has a message far more graphic and elaborate (for those who can read it) than the painted representations."

Lee Il (이일, 李逸, 1932–1997), a celebrated art critic known for his works on Korean Dansaekhwa, similarly underscored the significance of both the canvas and the image sketched on it: "The Chinese calligraphy of The Poem of 1000 Characters and the water drop images form an intimate and reciprocal relation. In other words, the Chinese characters are not simply laid out as a (back)ground, but actually serves as a cover for the water drop images."

The active employment of background of the canvas, paper, or any other material, in the formation of artistic expression, rather than a mere surface, is a common interest among Dansaekhwa artists. In Kim Tschang-yeul's works, "the water drops are not merely attached to the surface of a canvas, but rather fully entrusted to the canvas."

By the time Kim Tschang-yeul moved to Paris, he had turned to Buddhism, which deeply influenced his artistic narratives. The continuous links made to nature, as well as the apparent "dichotomy between nature and contemporary culture," as witnessed from the interaction between the droplets and space of the canvas form part of Kim's own understanding of the act of painting and of his painting subject matter: Kim explains that painting "clear, impeccable" water drops helps him contemplate and heal all anguishes, anxieties, and dark memories of his experiences from war.

== Legacy ==
Kim Tschang-yeul has been compared to Lee Ufan and Nam June Paik and described as a "towering figure of Korean modern art". He was named a chevalier of the Ordre des Arts et des Lettres in France, 1996, and received a silver crown (eun-gwan, 은관) of the Order of Cultural Merit from the South Korean Government in 2013.

Kim Tschang-yeul Museum was established in Jeju Island in September 2016. Kim Tschang-yeul donated 220 works to the museum, and his collection is also housed in various international museums and galleries, alongside works by Paik Nam June and Lee Ufan.
