= Park Seo-bo =

South Korean painter (1931–2023)

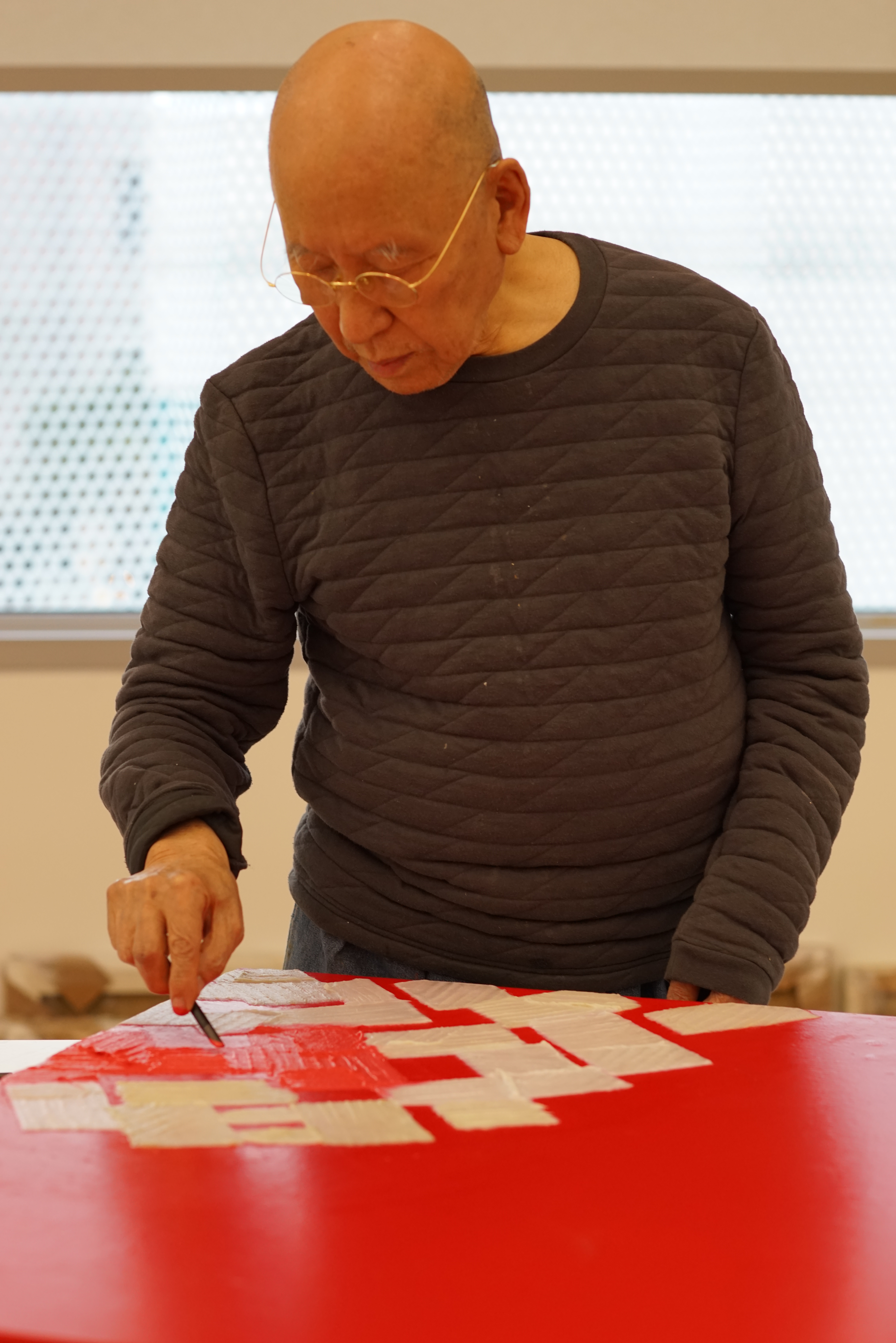
- Park working in 2019
- Born: Jae Hong; 15 November 1931; Yecheon, South Korea
- Died: 14 October 2023 (aged 91)
- Education: Hongik University
- Spouse: Myeong Souk Youn (m. 1958)

Korean name
- Hangul: 박서보
- Hanja: 朴栖甫
- RR: Bak Seobo
- MR: Pak Sŏbo
- Website: GIZI Foundation

Park Seo-bo (Korean: 박서보; 15 November 1931 – 14 October 2023) was a South Korean painter known for his "Écriture" series (1967 onwards), involvement in the Korean Art Informel movement, and particular formal concerns around painting that have led critics and art historians to identify him as a leading Dansaekhwa artist.

Park was part of the first generation of artists to begin building their careers in the wake of the Korean War after growing up under Japanese colonial rule, having their study interrupted by the outbreak of the Korean War, and surviving the conflict. Much of Park's early work emerged in response to his own experiences at the time.

After graduating from Hongik University, Park was very much on the social and art world periphery as both a draft dodger hiding under a new name (changed from Park Jae-hong), and ardent critic of the National Art Exhibition (Kukjeon for short). Park joined the Contemporary Artists Association (Hyeondae Misul Hyeohoe) in 1957, and became one of the main figures in the Korean Art Informel movement along with others in the association. Park sought to conceptually and materially challenge assumptions around painting at the time through his abstract paintings that experimented with texture, color, material, line, and shape. The main focus of his practice for over his last half century was exploring the formal possibilities for painting through an emphasis on process, and deemphasis on artistic intention in his "Écriture" series.

Increasing opportunities to write about foreign artists and travel abroad also compelled Park to take an active role advocating for the promotion of Korean contemporary art on a local and global scale. Park's mentorship of students at Hongik, curation of shows featuring emerging avant-garde artists, and work at the Korean Fine Arts Association (KFFA) played a crucial role in supporting generations of contemporary Korean artists. His work at the KFFA in particular was central to the development of Dansaekhwa.

After founding the Seo-bo Art and Cultural Foundation in 1994, Park passed on leadership to his son in 2014. He had his most recent retrospective at the National Museum of Modern and Contemporary Art, Korea (MMCA) in 2019, and there are now two museums dedicated to his work. Park worked and lived in Yeonhui-dong, Seoul.

== Early life ==
Park was born in Yecheon County, Keishōhoku-dō (North Gyeongsang Province), Korea, Empire of Japan on November 15, 1931. He was the third of eight children to father Park Jaehun and mother Nam Kimae. He was originally named Park Jae-hong, but began using the name Park Seo-bo in 1955 to avoid military conscription. In 1934, his family moved from Yecheon to Anseong in Gyeonggi Province. It was there that his father started to work as a local solicitor out of their house.

As a child, Park loved drawing. He spent much of his time copying paintings by Korean artists like Kim Eun-ho. Although his father wanted him to study law, Park insisted on continuing to pursue art in school.

== Education ==
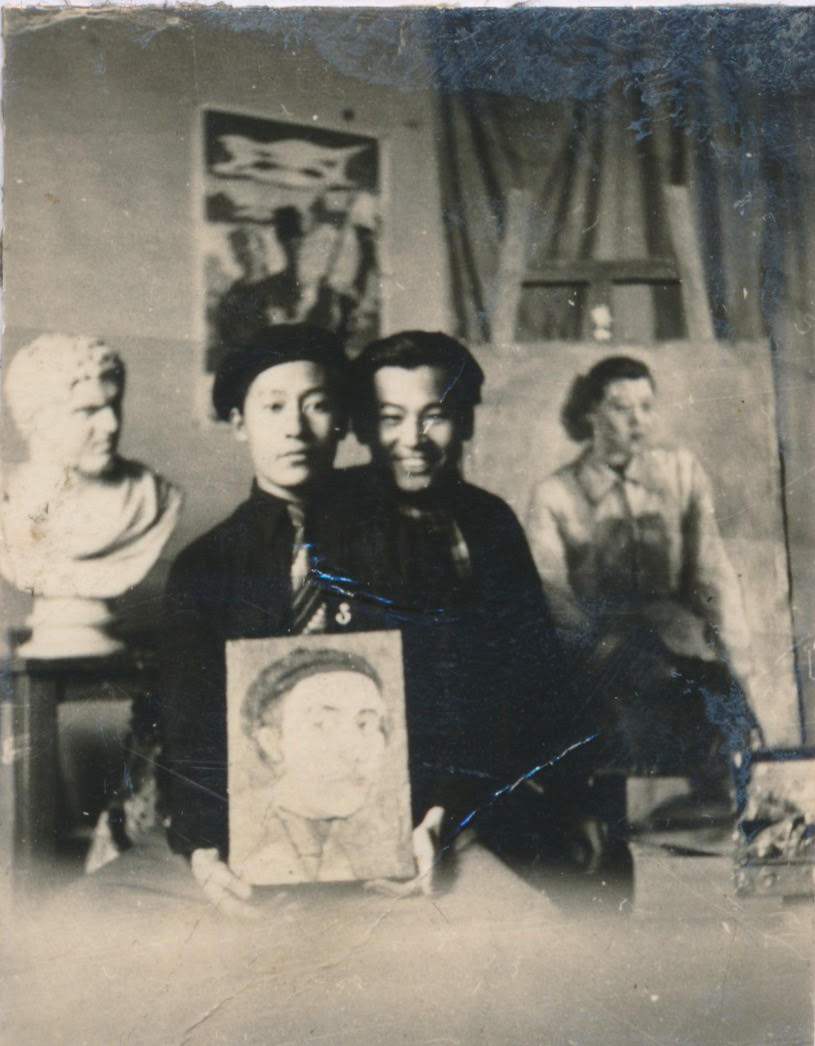
Park Seo-bo in his junior year at Hongik University in 1953 right after the ceasefire agreement that ended the Korean War.

=== Hongik University (1950–1955) ===
In spite of his father's opposition, Park enrolled at the College of Fine Arts at Hongik University to study Korean Painting under the tutelage of Yi Eungro. However, his freshman year was interrupted by the outbreak of the Korean War. He narrowly survived the war, dealing with the abrupt passing of his father, drafts both by North Korean and South Korean forces, and a long winter spent evacuating from his hometown Anseong to Masan on foot.

Due to the war, Hongik temporarily moved to Busan, thus making it possible for Park to return to school in 1952. In order to support himself, Park sold portraits to US soldiers on the street and in restaurants, but did not make enough to feed and house himself. He often slept in empty classrooms, and had to rely on others to buy him meals. He scavenged materials from garbage bins and stole soy sauce packets from Chinese restaurants to paint with.

As a second-year student, he changed his major to Western Painting because none of his professors from the department of Korean Painting remained. He studied under Kim Whanki before graduating in 1955. However, Park never attended the graduation ceremony. In order to avoid the military draft, he changed his name to Park Seo-bo. He was on the run until he won his case against the military on 16 May 1961.

=== Lee Bongsang Painting Institute (1957) ===
Park joined the institute in Anguk-dong, Seoul. Artists like Bang Geuntaek, Kim Tschang-Yeul, and Ha In-doo frequented the institute, collectively becoming known as the "Anguk school."

== Career ==
=== Contemporary Artists Association (Hyeondae Misul Hyeohoe) (1957–1958) ===
Park joined the Contemporary Artists Association in 1957, which included artists like Kim Tschang-yeul, Jang Seong-sun, Ha In-doo, and Kim Seo-bong. Art historian Kim Youngna identifies the group as the second generation of the Korean avant-garde, preceded by artists like Kim Whanki and Mun Haksu whose work was largely informed by artistic trends in Japan. In contrast, the younger generation of artists looked towards the European and American art worlds. Many of them were also part of the first generation of artists to graduate from art schools established after Liberation.

==== Korean Art Informel Movement ====
In spite of the limited information on Art Informel in Europe and Abstract Expressionism in the US that was available in Korea, the artists in the Contemporary Artists Association spearheaded the Korean Art Informel movement. Park rejected the linkage between the Korean Art Informel movement and its overseas counterpart, but Kim Youngna argues that formal similarities warrant the connection that art historians and critics have made between the two.

Park's Painting No. 1 (1957) shown at the Third Contemporary Exhibition in 1958 is now considered the first piece of Korean Informel art.

==== Exhibitions ====
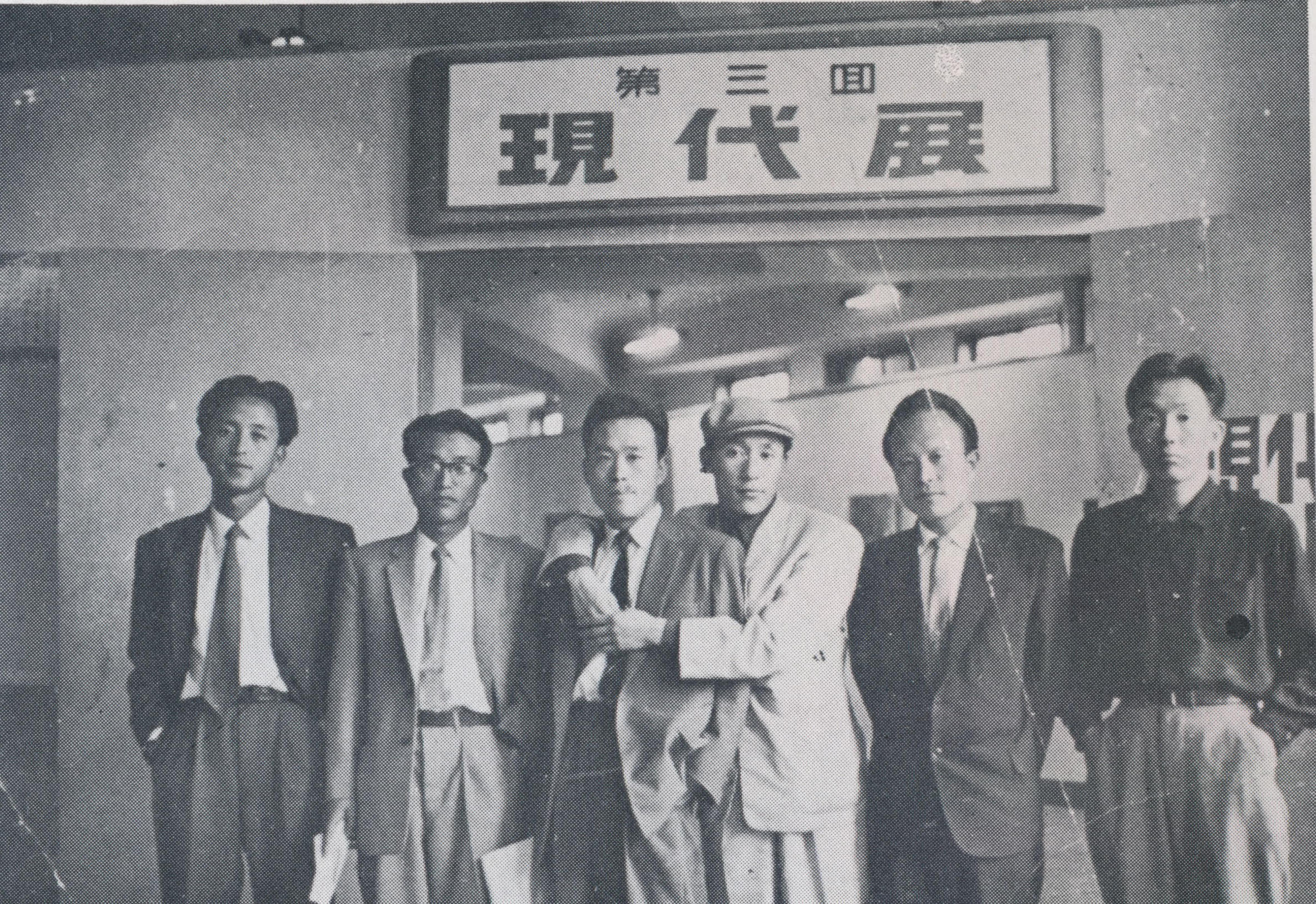
Park Seo-bo with his colleagues at the 3rd Contemporary Exhibition of Contemporary Artists Association in Seoul, South Korea in 1958.

The Association became one of the leading forces challenging the institutional control that the Ministry of Culture and Public Information-organized National Art Exhibition (Daehan minguk misul chollamhoe—known as Gukjeon for short) had over the Korean art world. Park won prizes at the 1954 and 1955 iterations of the salon. However, Park claimed that by 1956 he had identified elements of "corrupt anti-modernity" and "feudalism" at the salon. As a result, he and artists Kim Chung-seon, Mun Wu-sik, and Kim Young-hwan hung a poster with a manifesto condemning the salon at the entrance of their exhibition held in a gallery at the Dongbang Munhwa Building in May 1956. Park asserts that this marked the beginning of the collective stand avant-garde artist took against the national exhibition.

Park also turned away from the Kujeon by choosing to participate in the Association's exhibitions—titled the Contemporary Exhibition (Hyeondae-jeon)—upon joining the group.

Park submitted seven paintings to the Third Contemporary Exhibition held at Hwashin Gallery from May 15–23, 1958. Serially titled as Painting No. 1, etc., the first of the seven is now the only surviving work from the exhibition. Kim Youngna identifies the series painted in 1957 as a marker of a major shift in Park's style away from representation.

Photographs of Park painting a large canvas for the fourth exhibition held in the museum in Deoksugung from November 28 to December 8, 1958 appeared in newspapers like the Hanguk Ilbo, and The Korean Republic. Afterwards however, some members of the association critiqued Park, and voted to expel him from the group.

For the 6th iteration, Park suggested that the association push the government to support Korean artists who want to exhibit abroad, and raise funds for a Korean Pavilion at the Venice Biennale. Park continued to advocate for the expansion of the Korean art world beyond its national borders when he was able to travel abroad himself.

=== Global exposure (1960s) ===
==== Arts criticism ====
Park began writing for the Dong-A Ilbo in August 1960, introducing Korean readers to major avant-garde artists in Europe and America like Jackson Pollock, Jean Dubuffet, Roberto Crippa, Hans Hartung, and Georges Mathieu.

==== Travel abroad ====
Park traveled to Paris in January 1961 as the Korean representative of the UNESCO International Young Painters Exhibition, and stayed for a year.

While he was there, he critically examined the Parisian art world, and reported on exhibitions. Park described for Korean readers the dominance of Informel in Paris at the time:

At the moment, the Parisian art scene is saturated with the ''Art Informel'' that was initiated by Michel Tapié. This change is viewed by some artists as the signalling of a re-emergence of figuration, and others even say that the reversion to the figurative art is a due course set in the history of art. I think that they are ridiculing its value. It was a lazy way of acknowledging its value. Yes, it is true that ''Art Informel'' has pervaded the art scenery. Supposing that you look at it as a crisis, then this "crisis" stems from the contradiction within the abstractive art, and not from the reappearance of the figurative art. And another indirect reason for the current symptom in the art scene is that many people indiscriminately picked up abstraction.

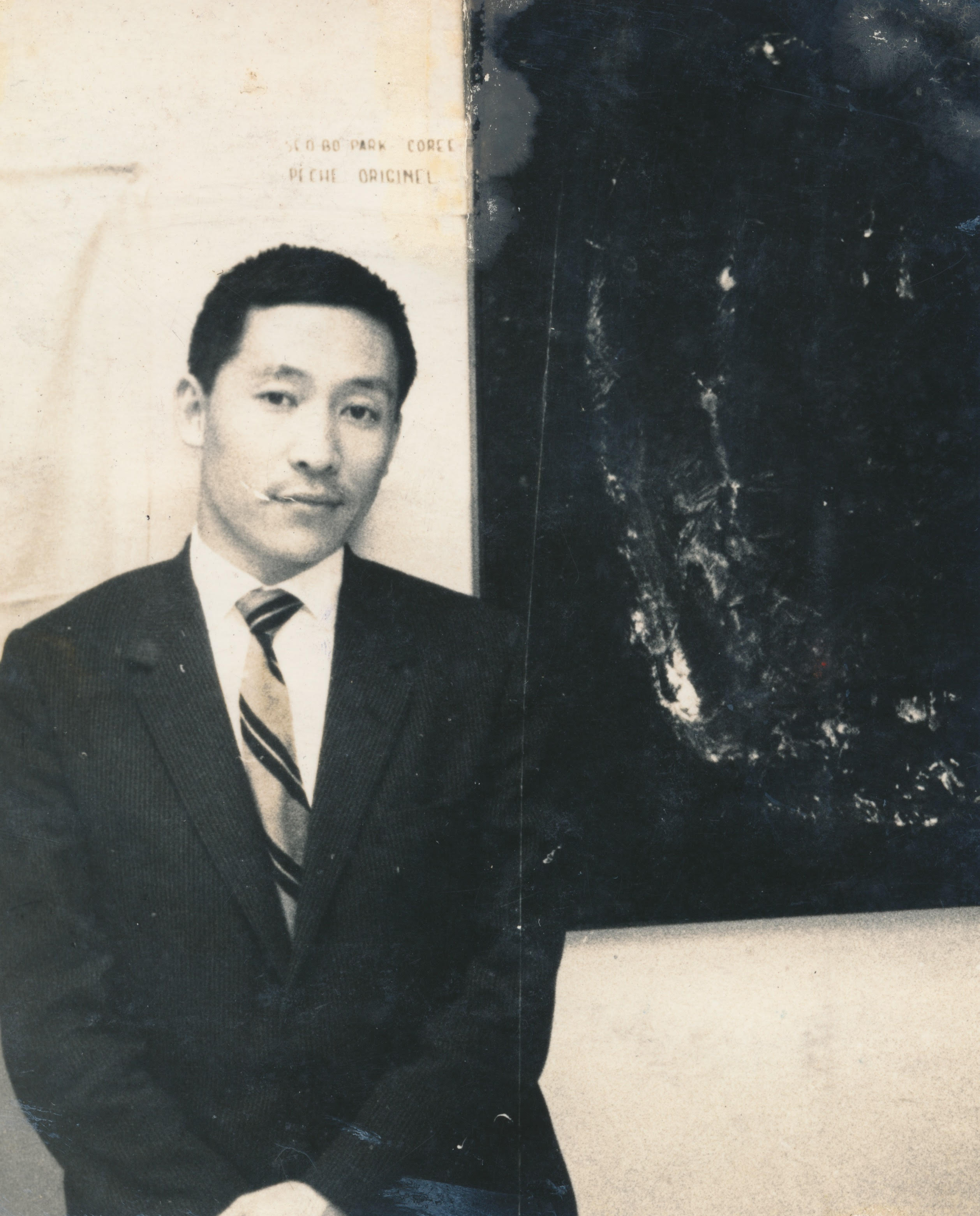
Park Seo-bo stands in front of his painting Péché Originel No. 8 (Original Sin No. 8) at the "Jeunes Peintres du Monde à Paris."

Park became particularly interested in the work of Spanish artists like Antoni Tàpies and Manolo Millares.Their influence is present in the piece Péché Originel No. 8 (Original Sin No. 8) that he produced for the joint exhibition "Jeunes Peintres du Monde à Paris."

Eager to showcase the abilities of Korean artists to Parisian audiences, Park persuaded president of the Association of Korean Students in France Shin Youngchul, Lee Il, and Korean Embassy consul Roh Youngchan to meet with the organizers of the Paris Biennale and urge them to allow Korean artists to participate. They were successful in their efforts, and made it possible for Korea to participate in its first international exhibition.

As a result, Park went to Paris again in 1963 as part of the group representing Korea at the 3rd Paris Biennale. He was also one of the Korean representatives for the 8th São Paulo Biennial two years later.

=== Dansaekhwa (early 1970s) ===
==== Connection to Korean Art Informel ====
A number of Dansaekhwa artists were active in the late 1950s – mid-1960s Art Informel movement in Korea, and Park Seo-bo traced the tendency to use a limited color palette in Dansaekhwa back to the movement.

==== Exhibitions ====
"Park Seo-Bo: Écriture" (Muramatus Gallery, Tokyo; Myeongdong Gallery, Seoul, 1973) was one of the shows that critic Oh Kwang-su identified as being part of a trend moving away from experimental sculpture and installation to painting characterized by an "absence of image." This shift towards the style that would later be identified as Dansaekhwa culminated in the 1975 group show "Five Korean Artists, Five Kinds of White," which curators and art historians often credit as the first major exhibition of Dansaekhwa. Park was one of five artists whose work was shown.

=== Teaching and administrative work (early 1960s–1990s) ===
==== Teaching ====
Upon returning to Seoul, Park began teaching at his alma mater in 1962. Park was promoted to assistant professor in 1964, but resigned in 1967. Living in seclusion, Park developed his "Écriture" series that year after seeing his three-year-old son Seung-ho repeatedly writing and erasing the word "Korea" on a gridded sheet. During this time he also began studying classical East Asian philosophy.

Park later returned to teach at Hongik, becoming dean of the Graduate School of Industrial Arts between 1985 and 1986, and dean of the College of Fine Arts from 1986 to 1990. He received an honorary doctorate from Hongik in 2000.

==== Korean Association of Plastic Artists ====
Artists and architects like Kim Swoogeun joined the association that Park founded in January 1968.

==== Korean Fine Arts Association (KFAA) ====
Park's position as first the vice chairman (1970–77) and then chairman (1977–1980) of the International Division of the Korean Fine Arts Association (KFAA) allowed him to organize large-scale exhibitions of experimental art that kickstarted the careers of emerging experimental artists and provided the crucial visibility needed for avant-garde artists to enter the international art arena. Artist Lee Ufan claims that Dansaekhwa would have been impossible without Park's mediation between institutions and artists to allocate resources from the former to the latter.

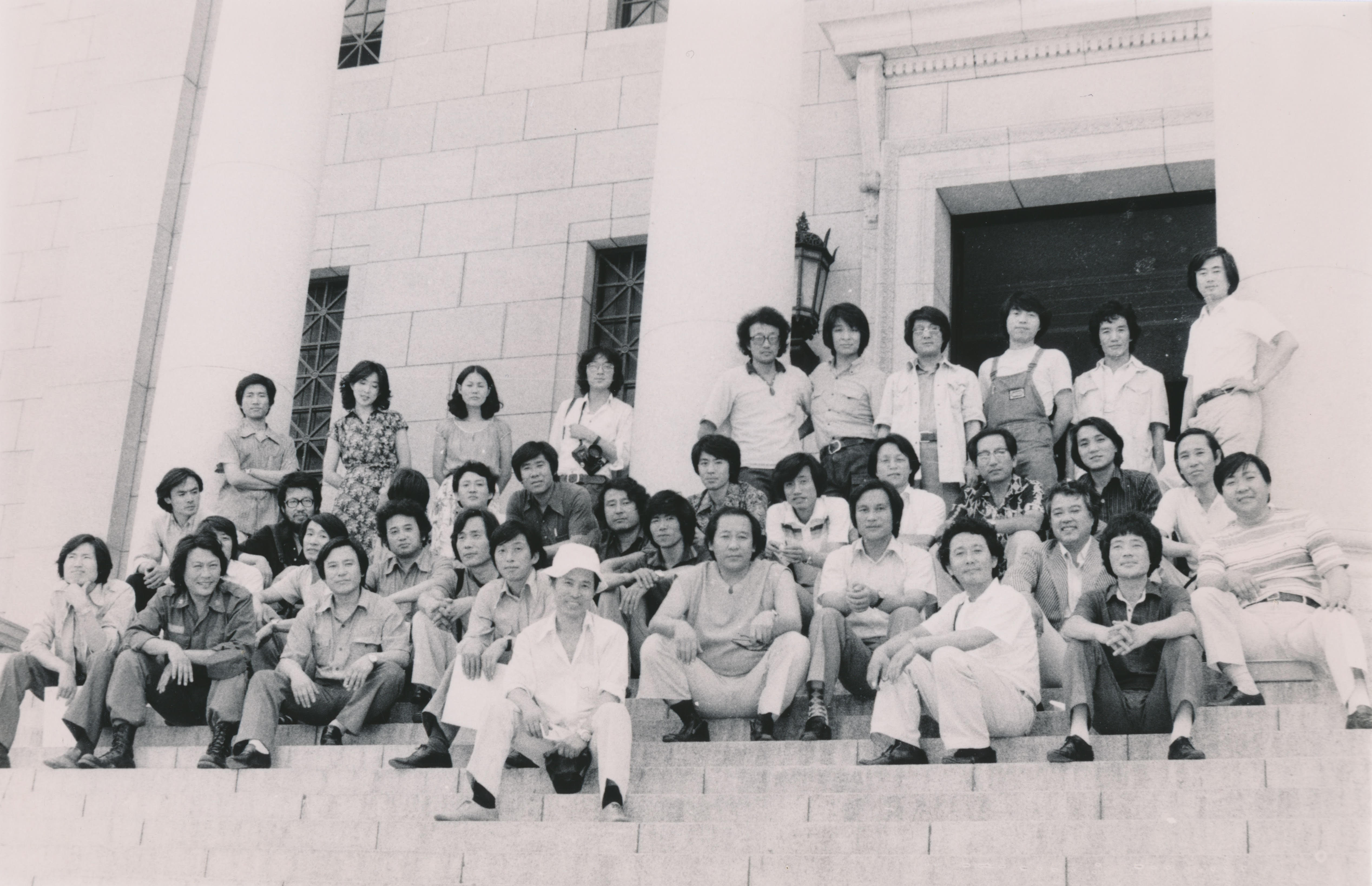
Park Seo-bo and participants of the first École de Seoul exhibition in 1975.

==== Exhibition organizing ====
Park continued promoting and supporting contemporary Korean artists throughout the 1980s, working as commissioner for the 11th Paris Biennale in 1980, collaborating with critic Lee Kyungsung to curate an exhibition titled "The Art of Contemporary Paper: Korea and Japan" in 1983, and urging the director of the Venice Biennale to build a Korean pavilion again in 1988 when he was invited to participate in a special exhibition for the 43rd iteration.

=== Late-career events and achievements (1990s–2023) ===
==== Studio ====
Park began building a studio for himself in Anseong, Gyeonggi Province in 1980 which he named "Hanseodang" after Hanseoam (Confucian scholar Yi Hwang's hermitage). In 1990, thieves stole hundreds of works from his studio, but many of the works were eventually recovered. However, six years later an accidental fire destroyed around 300 artworks, prompting Park to move his studio to Seogyo-dong, Seoul. He then commissioned an architect to create a studio and home for him in Seongsan-dong, Seoul.

==== Retrospectives ====
Park had two major retrospectives at the National Museum of Modern and Contemporary Art, Korea (MMCA), the first in 1991 titled "Park Seo-Bo's Painting: Its Forty Years," and the second titled "Park Seo-Bo: The Untiring Endeavorer" in 2019.

==== Foundation ====
Park founded the Seo-bo Art and Cultural Foundation in 1994, and was president until his first son took over in 2014.

==== Dedicated museums ====
Two museums specifically meant to house Park's work are currently under construction. One is in Jongno-gu, Seoul, and the other is a private museum on Jeju island.

== Artwork ==
=== "Primordialis" series (1957–mid 1960s) ===
Upon returning to Korea from Paris in 1961, Park began creating his "Primordialis (wonhyeongjil)" series utilizing a darker palette. Park used palette knives and combs to carve into layers of black and brown pigment, and sometimes added linen to the canvases.

Park stated that this series emerged from his experiences during the Korean War, and introduction to Jean Fautrier's "Otages" series (1942–45) through the Japanese magazine Bijutsu Techo. Fautrier's paintings reminded Park of his memories of the Korean War.

=== "Hereditarius" series (late 1960s–1970) ===
The "Hereditarius (yujeonjil)" series emerged out of his interest in outer space, and desire to experiment with spray-paint and bright colors, often utilizing the Korean color palette obangsaek (white, black, blue, yellow, and red). Some works in the series features faceless dressed figures reminiscent of George Segal's work, which Park cites as an influence.

Park presented part of this series at the "Contemporary Korean Painting" exhibition at the National Museum of Modern Art, Tokyo. It was during this trip to Japan that Park met Quak Insik, Lee Ufan, and Itami Jun.

Park presented another work, Hereditarius I at the "5th International Youth Artist Exhibition—Asian-Japan." .

==== Installation art (1969–1970) ====
Park tried his hand at installation art, displaying work from his "Hereditarius" series at the 1970 Expo in Osaka. Empty Space/Genetic Factor and Space (1970) featured a row of pieces of clothing molded around a missing human figure, and a coffin with a body buried under sand. However, the work was censored for supposedly being anti-government.

By 1970, Park stopped working entirely on both the "Primordialis" and "Hereditarius" series.

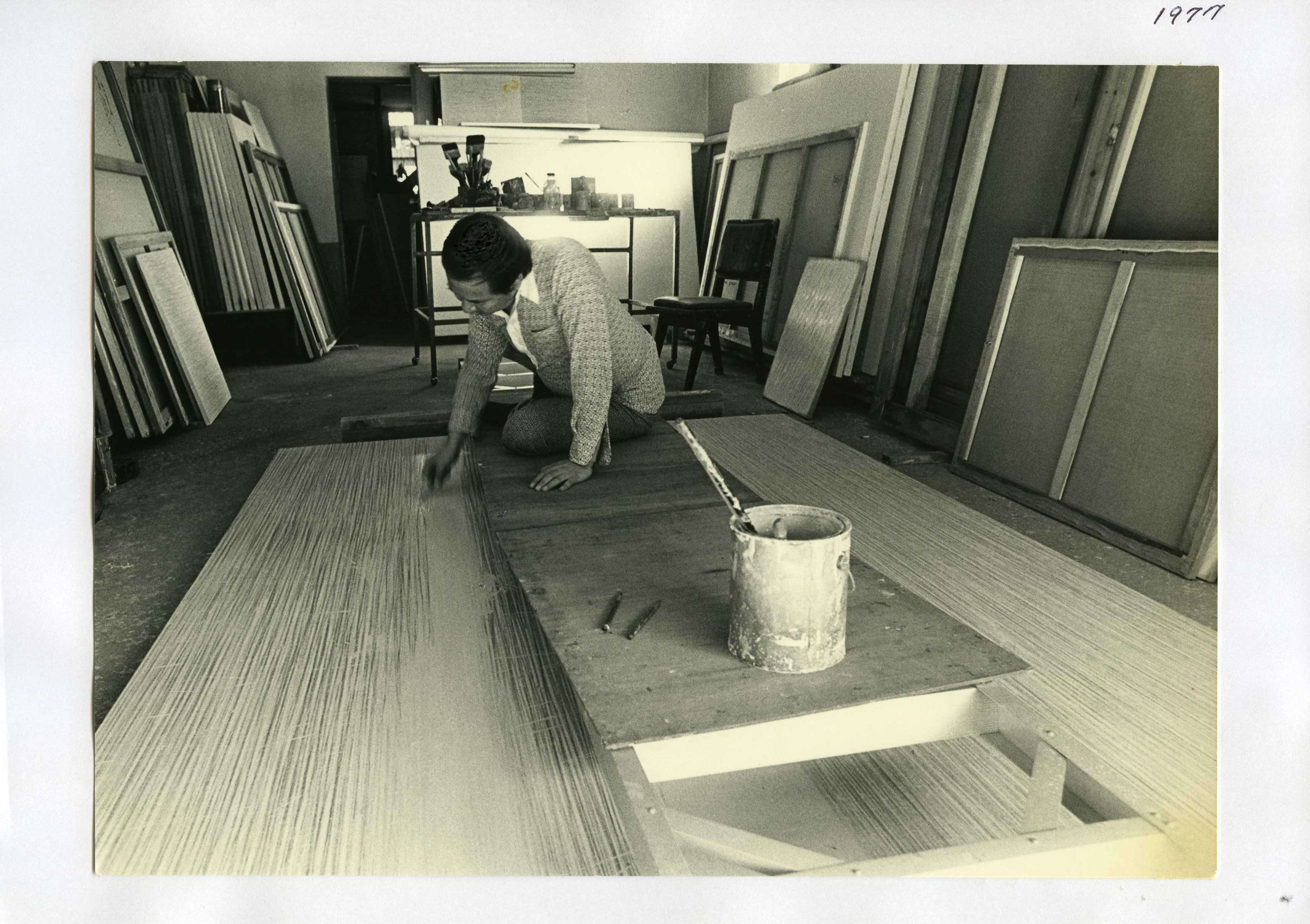
Park Seo-bo working on an Écriture piece at his Hapjeong-dong studio, 1977.

=== "Écriture" series (1967–2023) ===
Park's "Écriture" series features canvases layered with gesso and lines drawn from the top left corner to bottom right corner. According to Park, the repetitive gesture allowed him to become one with nature, and leave physical remnants of this union on a surface. Park experimented with the method for over half a decade, deliberately choosing not to show the works until 1973.

Park originally named the series Myobeop (method), but retitled it Écriture (meaning "writing" in French) a few years later after critic Bang Keun Taek suggested the term to him.

While he utilized pencil and paint for early works in his series, he later incorporated other tools and materials, including hanji.

==== Hanji (early 1980s) ====
Park began using hanji (Korean paper) in the series in the 1980s. Similar to his earlier "Écriture" pieces, Park drew lines using pencil, but added layers of hanji underneath the paint first. He began using other implements like wooden sticks, iron, and his hands, to create the lines.

Park attended a panel with Robert Rauschenberg, David Hockney, and Ida Shoichi at the 1983 International Paper Conference, where he talked about his work with hanji.

==== Black and white (early 1990s) ====
By the 1990s, Park shifted to a black and white palette for his "Écriture" series. He drafted sketches using litho crayon, pencil, and correction fluid pen on paper, and then replicated them using hanji paper soaked in water, pencils, and sharp tools.

==== Expansion in color palette (2000s) ====
Park imbued his works with bursts of color, including bright reds, yellows, greens, blues, and even pastel pinks. Park states that these colors are drawn from the pure beauty of nature, and that he began using them in the hopes they would have a calming effect on viewers.

=== Method ===
==== Emphasis on process ====
Like artist Kwon Young-woo, Park asserted the necessity of creating work without a predetermined technique or concept in mind, underlining the importance of action and deemphasizing artistic intention. Thus, while he likened his paper works to diaries, they are not expressions of himself. Rather, his role as an artist was to allow the material to speak for itself.

In response to a question on how the fact that Park let his assistants make the work connects to Park's ideas on artistic intention, Park drew an analogy between artistic creation and flowing water:

It’s like getting water from different sources. Whether it descends from the mountain and gathers in clay jars or cisterns, water always flows naturally and is able to take the shape and form of whatever contains it. Similarly I want to make something appear as clearly and naturally as water. I want to control my energy as a means of generating ideas and I wish, through my own experience, to make my work without any specific intention.

==== Color ====
Park often employed varying shades of white in his work, eschewing pure white hues and strong colors that impose the artist's will on nature:

The essence of my art lies in its view of nature. It is based on the perception that regards human as part of nature and upholds man's unification with nature. I always think that we should not put force on nature. This has led me to refuse strong colours but employ white colour and pencils instead. Pure white seemed to have a strong character, so I moderated it to white. To pursue a relationship between the wet white paint and pencil, I repeat this act until they do not dominate the other with their own character.

==== Relationship to traditional Korean art ====
Park cited Joseon era potters as his methodological predecessors, and his favorite type of art as the moon jar. He has also analogized his process with literati painting.

Park believed that the philosophical underpinnings of his work distinguishes it, along with other Dansaekhwa artworks, from Western art.

== Critical reception ==
Cheon Seungbok, a journalist for the Korean Republic writing in 1960, describes the unusual qualities of Park's work that defies typical definitions of painting:

"In a grammatical sense, I must say that it is hard to call his work painting, for he is a conscious action painter who tackles curious metal and chemical material and not much real paint, which is too dear for him to use. But to say that action painting like his is recondite, and therefore it is not painting, is like saying that advanced mathematics like differential calculus is not in the field of mathematics.

Seo-Bo never buys normal canvases. Instead, he goes out to a scrap shop in an odd corner of the East Gate second-hand market where he picks up a large patch of used tent canvas. This canvas material is usually full of dust and holes but the price is very reasonable for this artist who can hardly sell even one painting a year.

How does he paint a picture? A maggot in his head bites while he rasps dust off the home-made canvas. Then he needles some pieces of used hemp cloth onto the canvas, cements them, pastes copper or bronze powder, burns the surface with a torch lamp, and then corrodes parts of it with chemicals. The result is a complex of material in greyish black, white and on some spots, shimmering red, and this bears an air of mystery that conveys something like the undecipherable signature of a shaman. People complain that paintings like his are hardly understandable.

A painting is silent, but a good painting has compelling voices of silence. With these voices, an action painter must communicate the continuous dichotomy between the desire to give direct expression to a feeling and the desire to create pure harmony, which is a conflict inherent to the development of modern art."

Critic Toshiaki Minemura identifies the essential nature of Park's work as "structured semitransparency" that is both a formal quality of his paintings, and fundamental principal in the process of making each work.

Art historian Kim Yisoon links Park's process with Buddhist ideas around the linkage between repetition and enlightenment.

Art historian Joan Kee describes Park's practice as fundamentally concerned with painting's agency, and guided by a faith that painting is a "perpetually self-renewing medium...whose possibilities are best realized when subjected to particular limitations." She also notes that Park, like many other Korean artists at the time, was caught up in larger discussions of how to define Korean art in distinction to non-Korean art. Park had to explore the possibilities of participating in a larger discourse beyond Korean borders while conveying the specificities of his cultural context.

Curators like Alexandra Munroe often emphasize Park's attention to materiality that is not specific to a single medium.

Critics have offered a range of non-Korean artists to compare Park with, including Cy Twombly and Jasper Johns.

Critic and curator Shinyoung Chung argues that while Park's later color-filled work is refreshingly up-to-date, his newer paintings lack the meaning and resonance of earlier iterations.

== Personal life ==
At the Lee Bongsang Painting Institute he met a younger painting student named Yoon Myeong-Sook, and the two married in 1958. They had three children together.

Park later lived in a house in Yeonhui-dong, Seoul with his wife and his second son's family.

Park suffered from a myocardial infarction in 1994, and cerebral infarction in 2009.

In February 2022, Park revealed his advanced diagnosis of lung cancer and his decision to not seek treatment. He died from lung cancer on 14 October 2023, at the age of 91.

== Exhibitions ==
Recent Solo Exhibitions

2020

- "Park Seo-Bo," Johyun Gallery, Busan, Korea.

2019-2020

- "Park Seo-Bo," Langen Foundation, Neuss, Germany.

2019

- "Park Seo-Bo: The Untiring Endeavorer," National Museum of Modern and Contemporary Art, Seoul, Korea.
- "Park Seo-Bo Écriture," Galerie Perrotin, Paris, France.

2018

- "Park Seo-Bo Ecriture 1967-1976," White Cube, Hong Kong.
- "Park Seo-Bo Écriture," Galerie Perrotin, New York, USA.
- "修身-朴栖甫個展 (Pursuit of Inner Self)," Art Issue Projects, Taipei, Taiwan.

2017

- "Park Seo-Bo ZIGZAG: Ecriture 1983-1992," White Cube, London, UK.

2016

- "Ecriture 1967-1981," White Cube, London, UK.
- "ECRITURE," Galerie Perrotin, Hong Kong.
- "Empty the Mind: The Art of Park Seo-Bo," Tokyo Gallery+BTAP, Tokyo, Japan.
- "PARK SEO-BO Ecriture: Black and White," Tina Kim Gallery, New York, USA.
- "CIGE 2016 (China International Gallery Exposition 2016)," Johyun Gallery (Busan), Beijing, China.
- "Kintex Spoon Art Show," Keumsan Gallery (Seoul), Kintex, Ilsan, Korea.

2015

- Galerie Perrotin, New York, USA.
- Daejeon Museum of Art, Daejeon, Korea.
- Johyun Gallery, Busan, Korea.
- "Esquisse-Drawing 1996-2001," Rho Gallery, Seoul, Korea.

Recent Group Exhibitions

2019-2020

- "Marking Time: Process in Minimal Abstraction," Solomon R. Guggenheim Museum, New York, USA.

2019

- Taipei Dandai Art & Ideas (Booth E11), Johyun Gallery (Busan), Taipei, Taiwan
- Frieze Los Angeles 2019, Kukje Gallery (Seoul), Paramount Pictures Studies, LA, USA.
- Art Basel Hong Kong 2019, Kukje Gallery (Seoul), White Cube (London), Galerie Perrotin Paris) & Tokyo Gallery (Tokyo), Hong Kong.
- "On Art, Economy and Materiality," Cranbrook Art Museum, Bloomfield Hills, MI, USA.
- Art Basel 2019, Kukje Gallery (Seoul), White Cube (London), Galerie Perrotin (Paris), Tokyo Gallery (Tokyo), Basel, Switzerland.
- KIAF '19, Kukje Gallery (Seoul), Johyun Gallery (Busan)
- FIAC '19, Galerie Perrotin (Paris), Kukje Gallery (Seoul), White Cube (London).

2018-2019

- "Korean Abstract Art: Kim Whanki and Dansaekhwa," Powerlong Museum, Shanghai, China.

2018

- "Korea: Five Artists, Five Hinsek <white>," Tokyo Gallery, Tokyo, Japan.
- Art Basel '18 Hong Kong, Kukje Gallery (Seoul) & Galerie Perrotin (Paris) & Tokyo Gallery + BTAP (Tokyo), Hong Kong.
- Art Basel '18, Kukje Gallery (Seoul) & Galerie Perrotin (Paris) & Tokyo Gallery + BTAP (Tokyo) & Natalie Seroussi (Paris), Basel, Switzerland.
- Art Basel '18 Miami, Kukje Gallery (Seoul) & Galerie Perrotin (Paris), Miami Beach Convention Center, Florida, USA.
- Frieze Masters 2018, Kukje Gallery, Gloucester Green - Regents Park, London, UK.
- West Bund Art & Design 2018, Kukje Gallery (Seoul), Shanghai, China.
- FIAC 2018, Kukje Gallery Seoul) & Galerie Perrotin (Paris) & White Cube (London), Grand Palais, Paris, France.
- KIAF '18 (Korean International Art Fair), Kukje Gallery (Seoul) & Johyun Gallery (Busan), COEX, Seoul, Korea.

2017

- "Ism of Dansaek: Korean Abstract" (organized by Tokyo Opera City Cultural Foundation), Tokyo Opera City Art Gallery, Tokyo, Japan.
- Art Basel '17, Kukje Gallery (Seoul) & Galerie Perrotin (Paris), Basel, Switzerland.
- Art Basel '17 Hong Kong, Kukje Gallery (Seoul) & Galerie Perrotin (Paris) & Johyun Gallery (Busan), Hong Kong.
- Art Basel '17 Miami, Kukje Gallery (Seoul) & Tokyo Gallery + BTAP (Tokyo) & Galerie Perrotin Paris) & White Cube (London), Miami Beach Convention Center, Florida, USA.
- "Special Exhibition Celebrating the 1st Anniversary "His Friends from 1970s to 1980s," Kim Tschang-Yeul Art Museum-Jeju, Jeju, Korea.

2016

- "KM 9346 La Création Artistique Coréenne S'invite en Morbihan," Musée Domaine de Kerguéhennec, Morbihan, France.
- "Dansaekhwa," The Boghossian Foundation - Villa Empain, Brussels, Belgium.
- "New Beginnings: Between Gesture and Geometry" The George Economou Collection, Athens, Greece.
- Art Basel '16, Kukje Gallery (Seoul) & Galerie Perrotin (Paris) & White Cube (London), Basel, Switzerland.
- Art Basel '16 Hong Kong, Kukje Gallery (Seoul) & Galerie Perrotin (Paris), Hong Kong.
- Art Basel '16 Miami, Kukje Gallery (Seoul) & Galerie Perrotin (Paris), Miami Beach Convention Center, Florida, USA.
- Art Stage Jakarta 2016, Galerie Perrotin (Paris), Jakarta, Indonesia,
- CIGE 2016 (China International Gallery Exposition), Johyun Gallery (Busan), China World Trade Center, Beijing, China.
- "Korean Modern & Contemporary Art: 11 Artists," Rho Gallery, Seoul, Korea.

Special Exhibition Celebrating the 130th Anniversary of Korea-France Diplomatic Ties "Part II. Exchange Exhibition of Korean Resident Artists in France," Youngeun Museum, Gwangju, Korea.

- "After Drawing," Gallery Hyundai, Seoul, Korea.
- KINTEX Spoon Art Show 2016, Keumsan Gallery (Seoul), KINTEX, Ilsan, Korea.

2015-2016

- "Séoul-Paris-Séoul: Artistes Coréen en France," Musée Cernuschi, Paris, France.

2015

- "Dansaekhwa," Art Issue Project, Taipei, Taiwan.
- "Avant Garde Asia: Lines of Korean Masters," Sotheby's, Hong Kong.
- "Dansaekhwa" (organized by Kukje Gallery, Seoul), Palazzo Contarini Polignac, Venice, Italy.
- Art Basel '15, Kukje Gallery (Seoul) & Galerie Perrotin (Paris) & Blum & Poe (LA), Basel, Switzerland.
- Art Basel '15 Miami, Kukje Gallery (Seoul) & Galerie Perrotin (Paris), Miami Beach Convention Center, Florida, USA.
- FIAC '15, Kukje Gallery (Seoul) & Galerie Perrotin (Paris), Galeries Nationales du Grand Palais, Paris. France.
- Abu Dhabi Art 2015, Kukje Gallery Seoul) & Park Ryu Sook Gallery (Seoul), Abu Dhabi, United Arab Emirates.
- "A Table of Korean Contemporary Art: II. Dansaekhwa - Park Seo-Bo, Yun Hyong-Keun, Lee Kang So, Lee U Fan, Lee Dong Youb, Chung Sang Hwa, Chung Chang-Sub, Ha Chong-Hyun," Leeahn Gallery, Daegu, Korea.

== Awards ==
Awards

2019

- The 64th National Academy of Arts of the Republic of Korea Award (Fine Art Sector), the National Academy of Arts, Republic of Korea (NAA), Seoul, Korea.

2018

- Asia Arts Game Changer Awards Hong Kong, Asia Society, Hong Kong.

2015

- Awards in the Visual Arts 10, Hirshhorn Museum and Sculpture Garden, Washington, D.C, U.S.A

2014

- The 12th Lee Donghoon Art Award (Main Prize), Daejeon City & Joongboo Daily News, Daejeon, Korea.

2011

- The 9th Cultural Day: The Silver Certificate of Merit, Ministry of Culture, Sports & Tourism, Gangleung, Korea.

2009

- The 4th Special Art Award, Seok Ju Art Foundation, Seoul, Korea.

2008

- Korea Art Award, The Korean Artist's Day Organizing Committee & Korean Fine Art Association, Seoul, Korea.
- The 28th Suk-Nam Art Prize, Suk-Nam Art Foundation, New York, USA.

2004

- The 9th MANIF Grand Prize (Manifestation d'Art Nouveau International et Forum), MANIF organizing Committee, Seoul, Korea

1999

- The 1st Exceptional Art Award (Creation Sector), Korean Fine Arts Association, Seoul, Korea.

1996

- The Proud Hoingik Alumna Award, Hoingik University Alumni Association, Seoul, Korea.

1995

- The 44th Seoul Metropolitan Cultural Prize, Seoul Government, Seoul, Korea.

1994

- The Jade Crown of Cultural Medal, Ministry of Culture, Sports & Tourism, Seoul, Korea.
- The Proud Hoingik Alumna Award, Hoingik University Alumni Association, Seoul, Korea.

1993

- The Distinguished Service Medal, Seoul Federation of Teachers' Association, Seoul, Korea.

1990

- The Kowoon Cultural Award, Kowoon Cultural Foundation, Seoul, Korea.

1987

- The 1st Art & Culture Grand-Prize, The Federation of Artistic & Cultural Organizations of Korea, Seoul, Korea.
- The Distinguished Educational Service Medal, Korea Youth Worker Association, Seoul, Korea.

1984

- National Medal: "Seokryu" Medal, Ministry of Education, Seoul, Korea.

1979

- The 11th Culture and Art Prize, Ministry of Public Information, Seoul, Korea.

1976

- The 2nd Joong-Ang Cultural Grand-Prize, Joong-Ang Daily News, Seoul, Korea.

1972

- President's Commendation, Ministry of Home Affairs, Seoul, Korea.

1961

- The Jeunes Peintres du Monde à Paris: The 1st Prize (Sarcelles-Themed Competition), National Committee of I.A.A., Paris, France. Awards in the Visual Arts 10, Hirshhorn Museum and Sculpture Garden, Washington, D.C, U.S.A

== Collections ==
Collections

=== Overseas museums ===
- Musée Cernuschi, Musée des Arts de l'Asie de la Ville de Paris, Paris, France.
- Pola Museum of Art, Hakone, Japan.
- The Art Institute of Chicago, Chicago, USA.
- The Museum of Modern Art (MOMA), NY, USA.
- Hirshhorn Museum and Sculpture Garden, Washington D.C, USA.
- Solomon R. Guggenheim Museum, NY, USA.
- Guggenheim Abu Dhabi, Abu Dhabi, UAE.
- M+ Museum, Hong Kong.
- Yuz Foundation, Shanghai, China.
- Mie Prefectural Art Museum, Mie, Japan.
- Shimonoseki City Art Museum, Shimonoseki, Japan.
- The Museum of Contemporary Art, Hiroshima, Japan.
- The Museum of Modern Art, Toyama, Japan.
- Ohara Museum, Kurashiki, Japan.
- Museum of Contemporary Art, Tokyo, Japan.
- Fukuoka Art Museum, Fukuoka, Japan.

=== Korean museums ===
- Daegu Art Museum, Daegu.
- Gyeonggido Museum of Modern Art, Ansan.
- Museum San, Wonju.
- Posco Art Museum, Seoul.
- Total Museum, Seoul.
- Seoul Museum of Art, Seoul.
- Busan Metropolitan Art Museum, Busan.
- Gallery 63, Seoul.
- Gwangju City Art Museum, Gwangju.
- Han-Lim Art Museum, Daejeon.
- The Museum of Ewha Womans University, Seoul.
- Art Sonje Museum, Gyeongju.
- Gidang Art Museum, JeJu.
- Walker Hill Art Center, Seoul.
- The National Museum of Modern and Contemporary Art, Gwacheon.
- Leeum Samsung Art Museum, Seoul.
- The Contemporary Museum of Hong-lk University, Seoul.

=== Main Collectors ===
- Steven Cohen Collection, Stanford, USA.
- Rachofsky Collection, Dallas, USA.
- SIGG Collection, Switzerland.
- The George Economou Collection, Athens, Greece.
- Alexandra Monroe - Private Collector
- FNAC (French: Fonds National d'Art Contemporain Collection), Paris, France.
- SC Johnson & Son Council House, Racine, USA.
