= Foreigners Everywhere =

2024 art exhibition in Venice, Italy

- Central Pavilion in the Giardini della Biennale, featuring a mural by members of Huni Kuin Artists Movement (MAHKU)
- Date: April 20–November 24, 2024
- Venue: Giardini della Biennale and Venetian Arsenal
- Location: Venice

Foreigners Everywhere, curated by Brazilian Adriano Pedrosa, was the main art exhibition of the 60th Venice Biennale, which took place from April 20–November 24, 2024. Pedrosa's stated intention for the exhibit was to investigate the idea of living on the margins, whether as an outsider, a new arrival, or an Indigenous person.

There were 331 artists who were selected to take part, about a third more than the 2022 edition. Pedrosa has noted that a great number of the exhibiting artists are Indigenous and from the Global South, and a significant number also identify as queer.

Among the most visible indigenous artists in the exhibit was the Brazilian Amazon group, MAHKU (Movimento dos Artistas Huni Kuin), which created a mural covering the main exhibit hall in the Giardini area of the Biennale. In addition, the first gallery at the Arsenale hosts an installation by the Mataaho Collective, a group of four Maori women known for making large-scale fiber sculptures. Pedrosa's other curatorial selections included Native American artists Kay WalkingStick and Emmi Whitehorse and the Brazilian Yanomani artists Joseca Mokahesi and André Taniki.

Pedrosa, the artistic director of Museu de Arte de São Paulo, was the first curator of the Venice Biennale to be based in Latin America.

== Reception ==
While the main exhibit was applauded for highlight contemporary artists, specifically Brazilian works, the older historical pieces assembled from Asia, Africa, Middle East and Latin America were described as a "pell mell array." Jason Farago, critic for The New York Times, called the exhibit "a closed, controlled, and at times belittling showcase, which smooths out all the distinctions and contradictions of a global commons."

== Participating artists ==
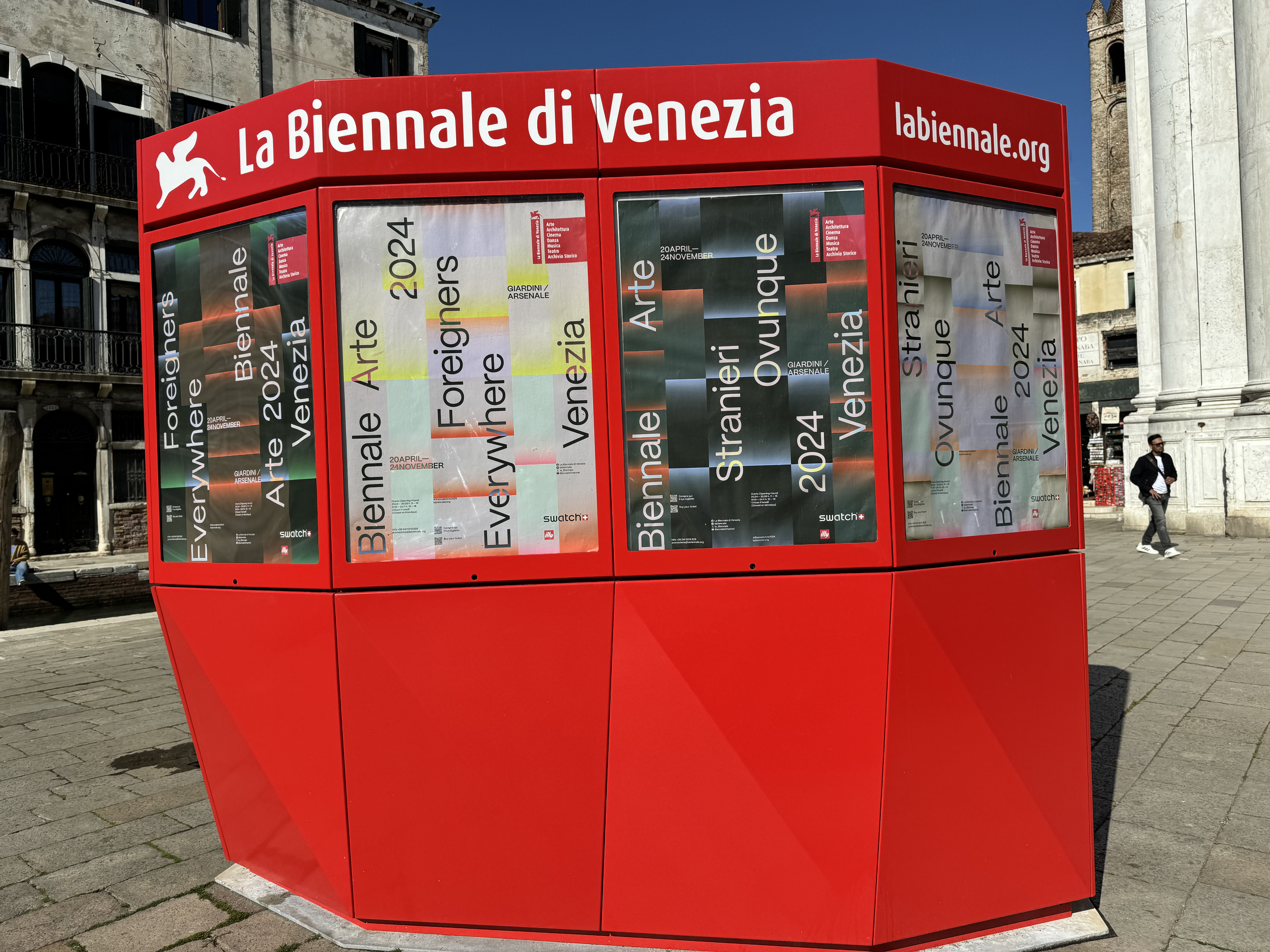
Kiosk with "Foreigners Everywhere" signage for 60th Venice Biennale in 2024

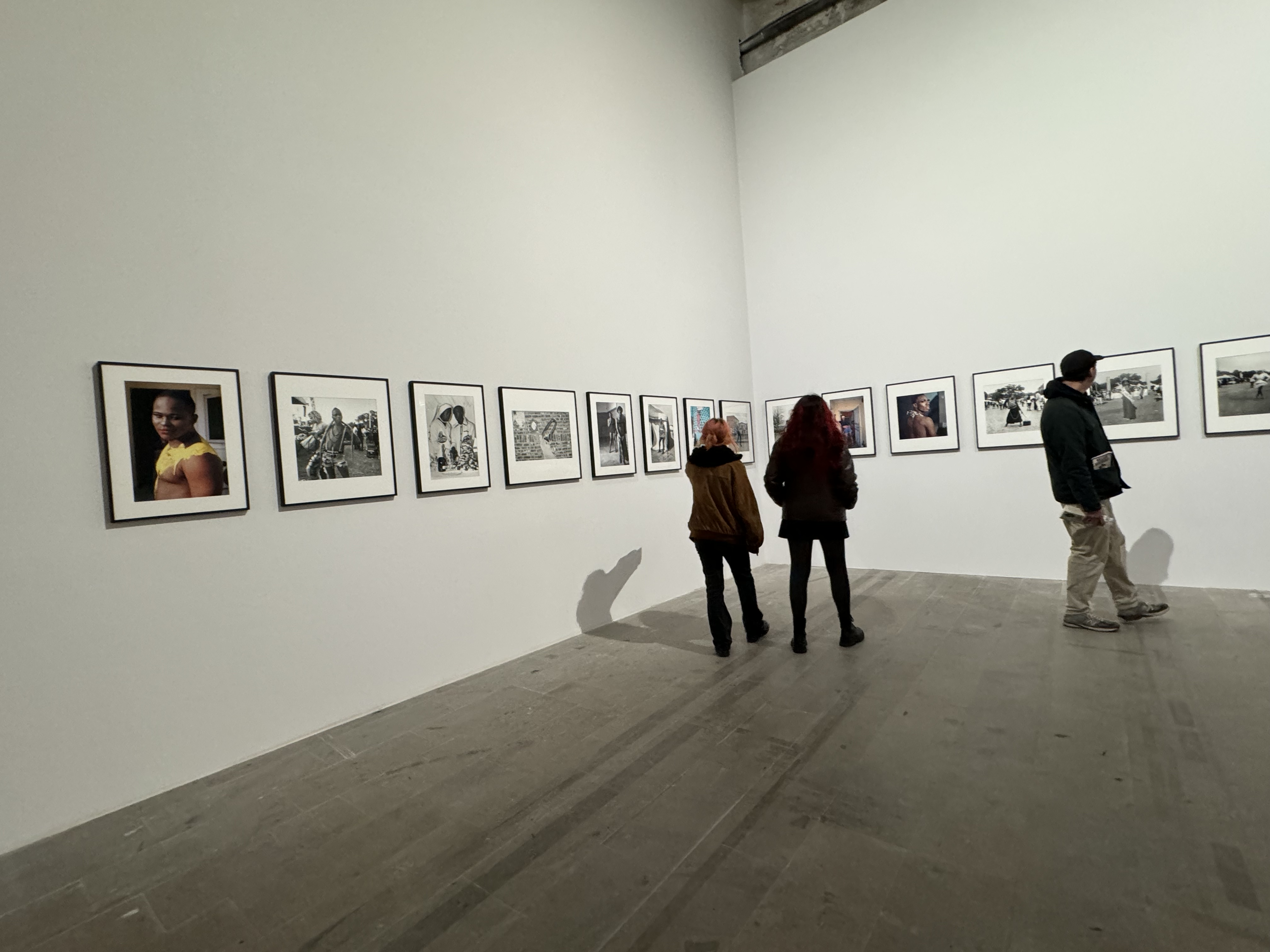
Interior of the Giardini exhibition space at the 60th Venice Biennale in 2024

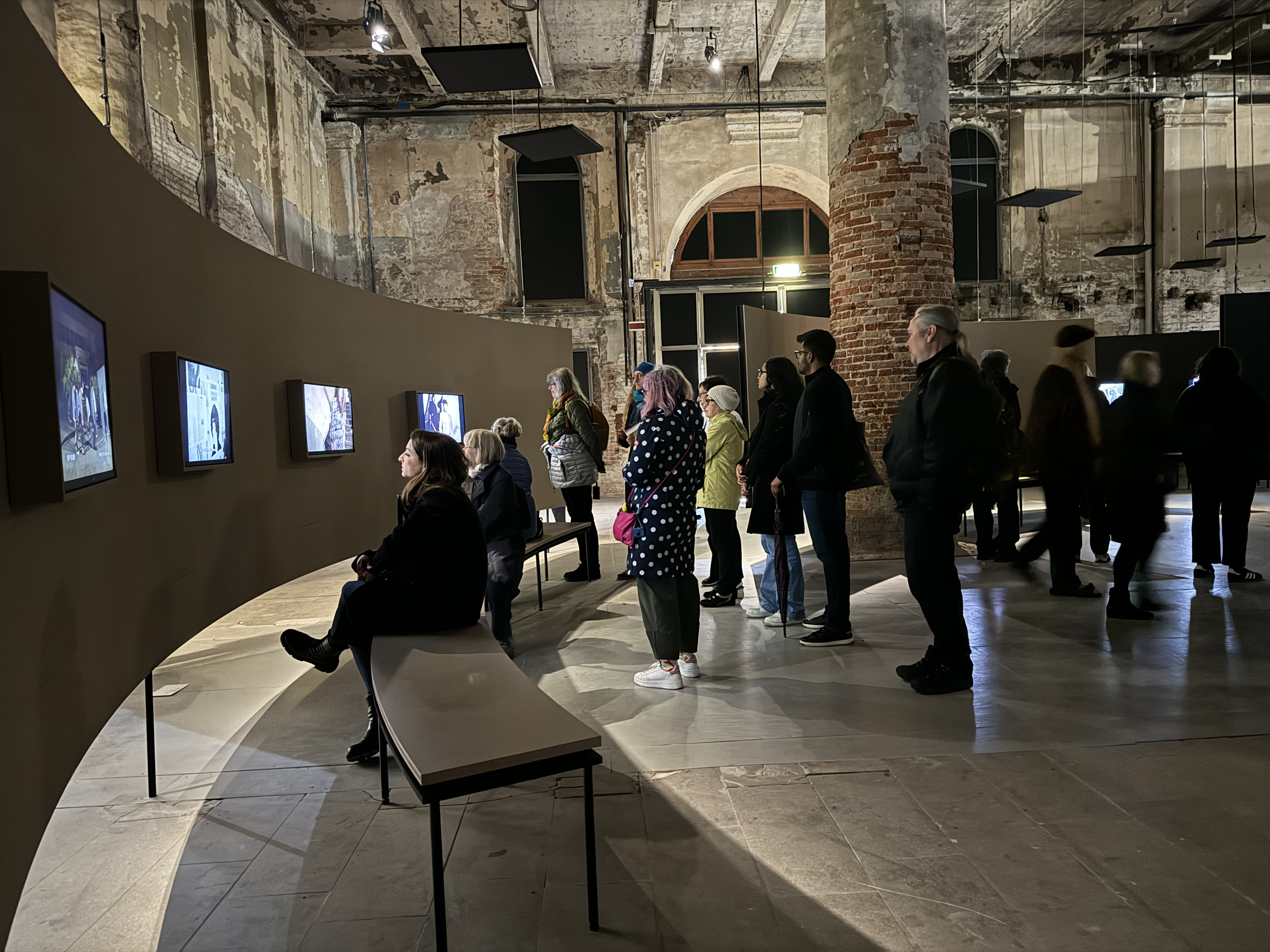
Interior of the Arsenale exhibit space during the 60th Venice Biennale in 2024

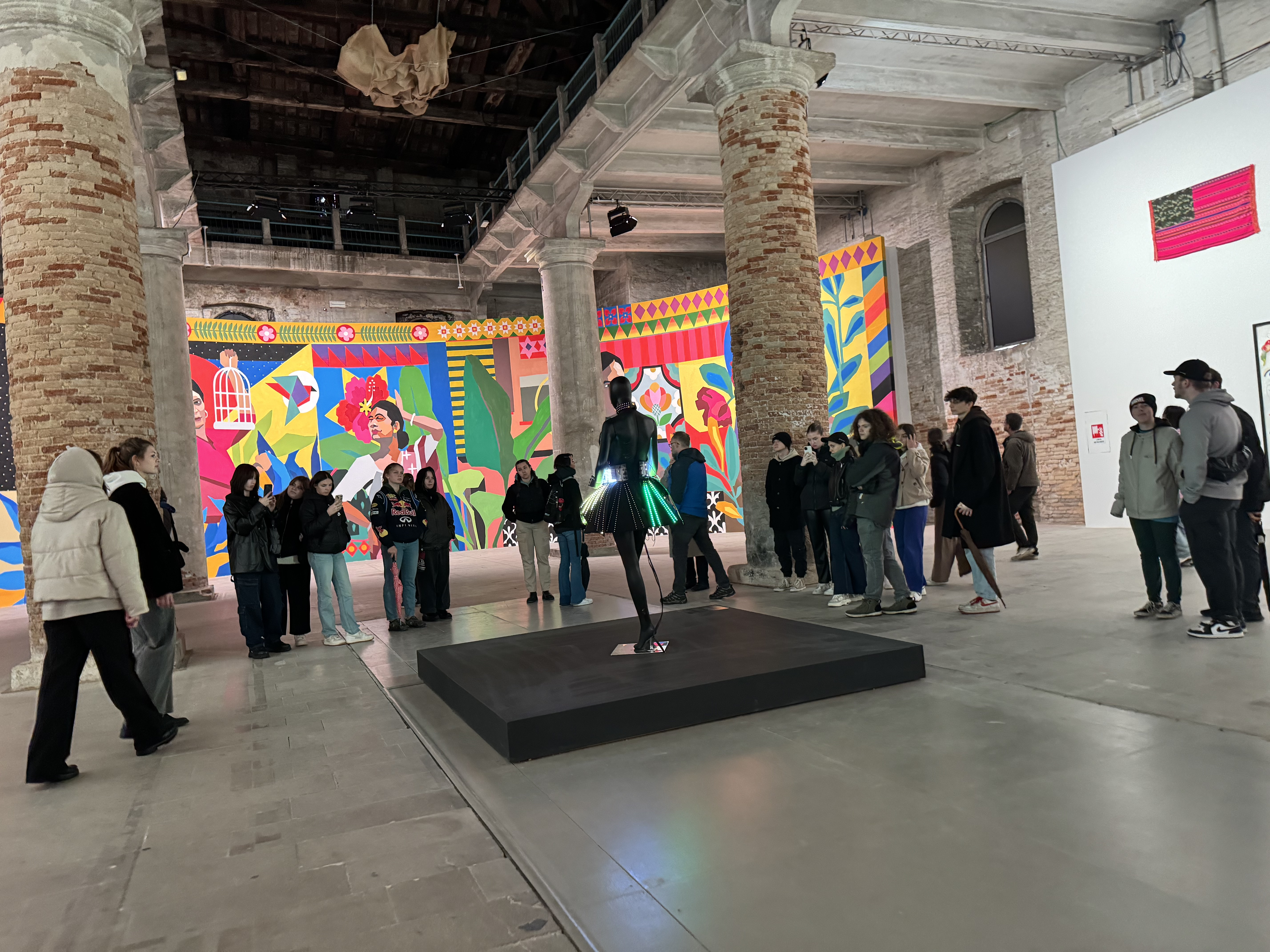
Interior of the Arsenale exhibit space during the 60th Venice Biennale in 2024

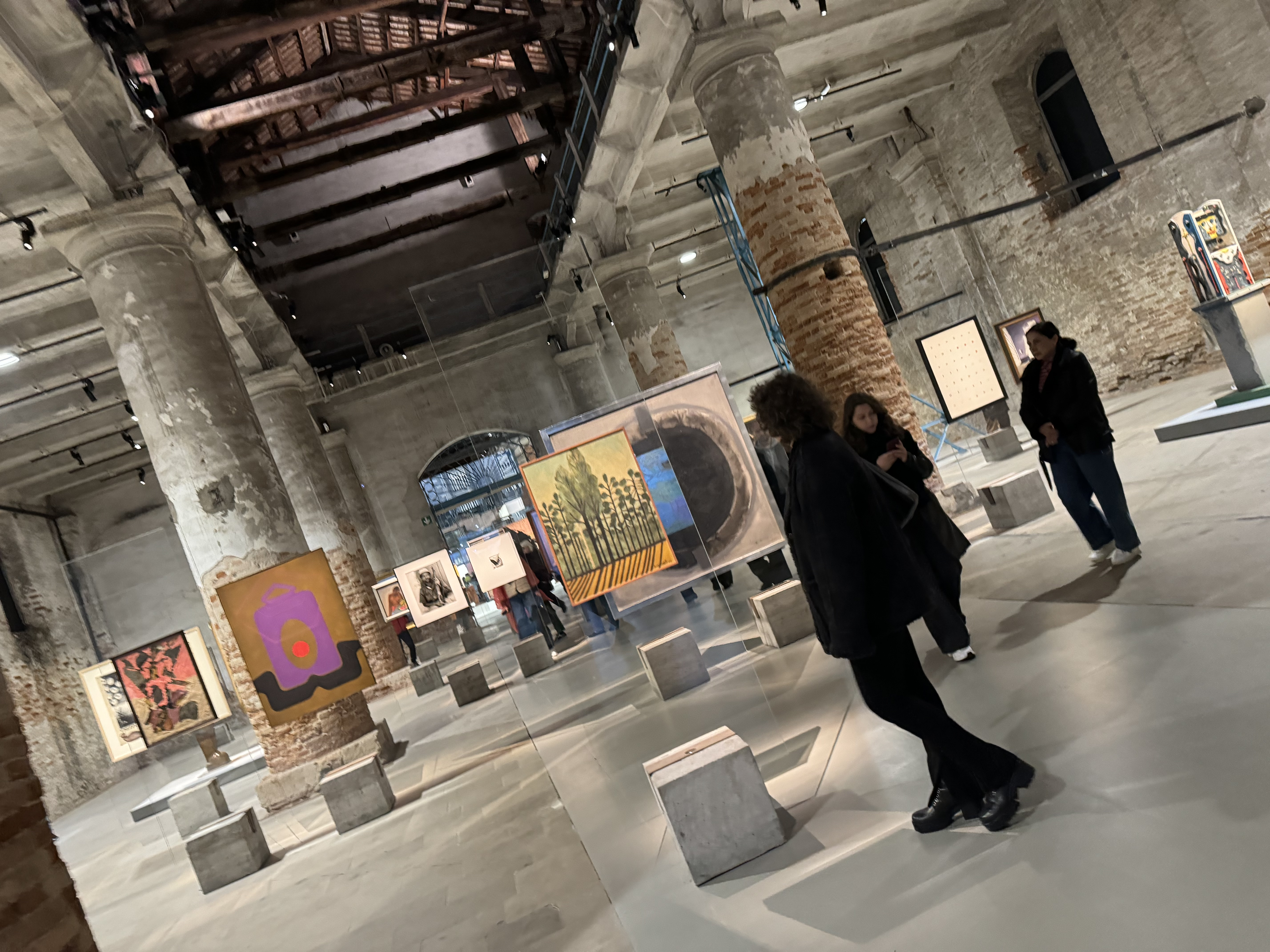
Interior of the Arsenale exhibit space during the 60th Venice Biennale in 2024

Name	Years	Birthplace	City of Residence
Pacita Abad	1946–2004	Basco, Philippines	lived in Singapore
Mariam Abdel-Aleem	1930–2010	Alexandria, Egypt	
Etel Adnan	1925–2021	Beirut, Lebanon	lived in Paris
Sandy Adsett	b. 1939	Wairoa, New Zealand	lives in Hastings, New Zealand
Affandi	1907–1990	Cirebon, Indonesia	lived in Yogyakarta, Indonesia
Zubeida Agha	1922–1997	Lyallpur, India	lived in Islamabad, Pakistan
Dia al-Azzawi	b. 1939	Baghdad, Iraq	lives in London, Jordan, and Lebanon
Claudia Alarcón & Silät	b. 1989	Comunidad La Puntana, Salta, Argentina	lives in Comunidad La Puntana
Rafa al-Nasiri	1940–2013	Tikrit, Iraq	lived in Amman, Jordan
Miguel Alandia Pantoja	1914–1975	Catavi, Bolivia	lived in Lima
Aloïse Corbaz	1886–1964	Lausanne, Switzerland	lived in Gimel, Switzerland
Giulia Andreani	b. 1985	Venice, Italy	lives in Paris
Claudia Andujar	b. 1931	Neuchatel, Switzerland	lives in São Paulo
María Aranís Valdivia	1903–1966	Santiago, Chile	lived in Chile
Aravani Art Project	founded 2016	Bangalore, India	based in several cities in India
Iván Argote	b. 1983	Bogotá, Colombia	lives in Paris
Karimah Ashadu	b. 1985	London, England	lives in Hamburg and Lagos
Dana Awartani	b. 1987	Jeddah, Saudi Arabia	lives in Jeddah
Aycoobo (Wilson Rodríguez)	b. 1967	La Chorrera, Colombia	lives in Bogotá
Margarita Azurdia	1931–1998	Antigua, Guatemala	lived in Guatemala City
Leilah Babirye	b. 1985	Kampala, Uganda	lives in New York
Libero Badii	1916–2001	Arezzo, Italia	lived in Buenos Aires
Ezekiel Baroukh	1909–1984	Mansoura, Egypt	lived in Paris
Baya (artist)	1931–1998	Bordj El Kiffan, Algeria	lived in Blida, Algeria
Aly Ben Salem	1910–2001	Tunis, Tunisia	lived in Stockholm
Semiha Berksoy	1910–2004	Istanbul, Turkey	
Gianni Bertini	1922–2010	Pisa, Italy	lived in Caen, France
Lina Bo Bardi	1914–1992	Rome, Italy	lived in São Paulo
Maria Bonomi	b. 1935	Meina, Italy	lives in São Paulo
Bordadoras de Isla Negra	1967–1980	Isla Negra, Chile	
Victor Brecheret	1894–1955	Farnese, Italy	lived in São Paulo
Huguette Caland	1931–2019	Beirut, Lebanon	
Sol Calero	b. 1982	Caracas, Venezuela	lives in Berlin
Elda Cerrato	1930–2023	Asti, Italy	lived in Buenos Aires
Mohammed Chebaa	1935–2013	Tangier, Morocco	lived in Casablanca, Morocco
Georgette Chen	1906–1993	Zhejiang, China	lived in Singapore
Galileo Chini	1873–1956	Florence, Italy	
Kudzanai Chiurai	b. 1980	Harare, Zimbabwe	lives in Harare
Isaac Chong Wai	b. 1990	Hong Kong	lives in Berlin and Hong Kong
Saloua Raouda Choucair	1916–2017	Beirut, Lebanon	
Chaouki Choukini	1946	Choukine, Lebanon	lives in La Verrière, France
Chua Mia Tee	b. 1931	Shantou, China	lives in Singapore
Claire Fontaine	founded 2004	Paris, France	based in Palermo, Italy
Manauara Clandestina	b. 1992	Manaus, Brazil	lives in São Paulo
River Claure	b. 1997	Cochabamba, Bolivia	lives in Cochabamba and La Paz, Bolivia
Julia Codesido	1883–1979	Lima, Peru	
Liz Collins	b. 1968	Alexandria, New York	lives in Brooklyn, NY
Jaime Colson	1901–1975	Puerto Plata, Dominican Republic	lived in Santo Domingo, Dominican Republic
Waldemar Cordeiro	1925–1973	Rome, Italy	lived in São Paulo
Monika Correa	b. 1938	Mumbai, India	lives in Mumbai
Beatriz Cortez	b. 1970	San Salvador, El Salvador	lives in Los Angeles and Davis, CA
Olga Costa	1913–1993	Leipzig, Germany	lived in Guanajuato, Mexico
Miguel Covarrubias	1904–1957	Mexico City, Mexico	
Victor Juan Cúnsolo	1898–1936	Vittoria, Italy	lived in Lanus, Argentina
Andrés Curruchich	1891–1969	Comalapa, Guatemala	
Rosa Elena Curruchich	1958–2005	Comalapa, Guatemala	
Djanira da Motta e Silva	1914–1979	Avaré, Brazil	lived in Rio de Janeiro
Olga De Amaral	b. 1932	Bogotá, Colombia	lives in Bogotá
Filippo de Pisis	1896–1956	Ferrara, Italy	lived in Milan
Juan Del Prete	1897–1987	Vasto, Italy	lived in Buenos Aires
Pablo Delano	b. 1954	San Juan, Puerto Rico	lives in West Hartford, CT
Emiliano Di Cavalcanti	1897–1976	Rio de Janeiro, Brazil	
Danilo Di Prete	1911–1985	Zambra, Italy	lived in São Paulo
Cícero Dias	1907–2003	Escada, Brazil	lived in Paris
Disobedience Archive a project by italian curator Marco Scotini with Ursula Biemann, Black Audio Film Collective, Seba Calfuqueo, Simone Cangelosi, Cinéastes pour les sans-papiers, Critical Art Ensemble, Snow Hnin Ei Hlaing, Marcelo Expósito, Maria Galindo & Mujeres Creando, Barbara Hammer, mixrice, Khaled Jarrar, Sara Jordenö, Bani Khoshnoudi, Maria Kourkouta & Niki Giannari, Pedro Lemebel, LIMINAL & Border Forensics, Angela Melitopoulos, Jota Mombaça, Carlos Motta, Muholi, Pınar Öğrenci, Daniela Ortiz, Pansittivorakul, Anand Patwardhan, Pilot TV Collective, Queerocracy, Oliver Ressler and Zanny Begg, Carole Roussopoulos, Güliz Sağlam, Irwan Ahmett & Tita Salina, Shah, Sim Chi Yin, Hito Steyerl, Sweatmother, Raphaël Grisey and Bouba Touré, Nguyễn Trinh Thi, James Wentzy, Želimir Žilnik	Various	Various	Various
Juana Elena Diz	1925–?	Buenos Aires, Argentina	
Tarsila do Amaral	1886–1973	Capivari, Brazil	lived in São Paulo
Saliba Douaihy	1915–1994	Ehden, Lebanon	lived in New York
Dullah	1919–1996	Surakarta, Indonesia	lived in Yogyakarta, Indonesia
Inji Efflatoun	1924–1989	Cairo, Egypt	
Uzo Egonu	1931–1996	Onitsha, Nigeria	lived in London
Mohammad Ehsaei	b. 1939	Qazvin, Iran	lives in Tehran and Vancouver
Hatem El Mekki	1918–2003	Jakarta, Indonesia	lived in Carthage, Tunisia
Aref El Rayess	1928–2005	Aley, Lebanon	
Ibrahim El-Salahi	b. 1930	Omduran, Sudan	lives in Oxford, England
Elyla	b. 1989	Chontales, Nicaragua	lives in Masaya, Nicaragua
Ben Enwonwu	1917–1994	Onitsha, Nigeria	lived in Lagos
Romany Eveleigh	1934–2020	London, England	lived in Rome
Hamed Ewais	1919–2011	Beni Soueif, Egypt	lived in Cairo
Dumile Feni	1939–1991	Worcester, South Africa	lived in New York
Alessandra Ferrini	b. 1984	Florence, Italy	lives in London
Cesare Ferro Milone	1880–1934	Turin, Italy	
Raquel Forner	1902–1988	Buenos Aires, Argentina	
Simone Forti	b. 1935	Florence, Italy	lives in Los Angeles
Victor Fotso Nyie	b. 1990	Douala, Cameroon	lives in Faenza, Italy
Louis Fratino	b. 1993	Annapolis, MD	lives in Brooklyn, NY
Paolo Gasparini	b. 1934	Gorizia, Italy	lives in Trieste, Caracas, and Mexico City
Sangodare Gbadegesin Ajala	1948–2021	Osogbo, Nigeria	
Umberto Giangrandi	b. 1943	Pontedera, Italy	lives in Bogotá
Madge Gill	1882–1961	Walthamstow, England	lived in London
Marlene Gilson	b. 1944	Wadawurrung, Warrnambool, Australia	lives in Gordon, Australia
Luigi Domenico Gismondi	1872–1946	Sanremo, Italy	lived in Mollendo, Peru
Domenico Gnoli (painter)	1933–1970	Rome, Italy	lived in New York
Gabrielle Goliath	b. 1983	Kimberley, South Africa	lives in Johannesburg
Brett Graham	b. 1967	Auckland, Aotearoa, New Zealand	lives in Auckland
Fred Graham (sculptor)	b. 1928	Arapuni, Aotearoa, New Zealand	lives in Waiuku, Aotearoa, New Zealand
Enrique Grau Araújo	1920–2004	Panama City, Panama	lived in Bogotá
Oswaldo Guayasamín	1919–1999	Quito, Ecuador	lived in Baltimore
Nedda Guidi	1923–2015	Gubbio, Italy	lived in Rome
Hendra Gunawan (painter)	1918–1983	Bandung, Indonesia	lived
Antonio Jose Guzman & Iva Jankovic	b. 1971 & b. 1979	Panama City; Ruma, Serbia	lives in Amsterdam and Panama City; lives in Amsterdam
Marie Hadad	1889–1973	Beirut, Lebanon	
Samia Halaby	b. 1936	Jerusalem	lives in New York
Tahia Halim	1919–2003	Dongola, Sudan	lived in Cairo
Lauren Halsey	b. 1987	Los Angeles, United States	lives in Los Angeles
Nazek Hamdi	1926–2019	Cairo, Egypt	
Mohamed Hamidi	b. 1941	Casablanca, Morocco	lives in Casablanca and Azemmour, Morocco
Faik Hassan	1914–1992	Baghdad, Iraq	lived in Paris
Kadhim Hayder	1932–1985	Baghdad, Iraq	
Gilberto Hernández Ortega	1923–1979	Baní, Dominican Republic	lived in Santo Domingo, Dominican Republic
Carmen Herrera	1915–2022	Havana, Cuba	lived in New York
Evan Ifekoya	b. 1988	Iperu, Nigeria	lives in London
Julia Isídrez	b. 1967	Itá, Paraguay	lives in Itá
Mohammed Issiakhem	1928–1985	Tizi Ouzou, Algeria	lived in Algiers
Elena Izcue Cobián	1889–1970	Lima, Peru	
María Izquierdo	1902–1955	San Juan de los Lagos, Mexico	lived in Mexico City
Nour Jaouda	b. 1997	Cairo, Egypt	lives in Cairo and London
Rindon Johnson	b. 1990	San Francisco, United States	lives in Berlin
Joyce Joumaa	b. 1998	Beirut, Lebanon	lives in Montreal, Biennale College Arte
Mohammed Kacimi	1942–2003	Meknes, Morocco	lived in Rabat, Morocco
Frida Kahlo	1907–1954	Mexico City, Mexico	
Nazira Karimi	b. 1996	Dushanbe, Tajikistan	lives in Almaty, Kazakhstan, and Vienna, Austria, Biennale College Arte
George Keyt	1901–1993	Kandy, Sri Lanka	lived in Colombo, Sri Lanka
Bhupen Khakhar	1934–2003	Bombay	lived in Baroda, India
Bouchra Khalili	b. 1975	Casablanca, Morocco	lives in Berlin and Vienna
Kiluanji Kia Henda	b. 1979	Luanda, Angola	lives in Luanda
Linda Kohen	b. 1924	Milan	lives in Montevideo, Uruguay
Shalom Kufakwatenzi	b. 1995	Harare, Zimbabwe	lives in Harare
Ram Kumar	1924–2018	Shimla, India	lived in Delhi
Fred Kuwornu	b. 1971	Bologna, Italy	lives in New York
Grace Salome Kwami	1923–2006	Worawora, Ghana	
Lai Foong Moi	1931–1995	Negeri Sembilan, Malaysia	lived in Singapore
Wifredo Lam	1902–1982	Sagua la Grande, Cuba	lived in Paris
Judith Lauand	1922–2022	Araraquara, Brazil	lived in São Paulo
Maggie Laubser	1886–1973	Bloublommetjieskloof, South Africa	lived in Strand, South Africa
Simon Lekgetho	1929–1985	Schoemansville, South Africa	lived in Ga-Rankuwa, South Africa
Celia Leyton Vidal	1895–1975	Santiago, Chile	
Lim Mu Hue	1936–2008	Singapore	
Romualdo Locatelli	1905–1943	Bergamo, Italy	lived in Manila
Bertina Lopes	1924–2012	Maputo, Mozambique	lived in Rome
Amadeo Luciano Lorenzato	1900–1995	Belo Horizonte, Brazil	
Anita Magsaysay-Ho	1914–2012	Zambales, Philippines	lived in Manila
MAHKU (Movimento dos Artistas Huni Kuin)	founded 2013	Kaxinawá (Huni Kuin) Indigenous Territory, Acre, Brazil	based in Kaxinawá (Huni Kuin) Indigenous Territory, Brazil
Esther Mahlangu	b. 1935	Middelburg, South Africa	lives in Mpumalanga, South Africa
Anna Maria Maiolino	b. 1942	Scalea, Italy	lives in São Paulo
Anita Malfatti	1889–1964	São Paulo, Brazil	
Ernest Mancoba	1904–2002	Johannesburg, South Africa	lived in Clamart, France
Edna Manley	1900–1987	Bournemouth, England	lived in Kingston, Jamaica
Josiah Manzi	1933–2022	Zimbabwe	
Teresa Margolles	b. 1963	Culiacán, Mexico	lives in Mexico City and Madrid
Maria Martins	1894–1973	Campanha, Brazil	lived in Rio de Janeiro
María Martorell	1909–2010	Salta, Argentina	
Mataaho Collective	founded 2012	Aotearoa, New Zealand	based in Aotearoa
Naminapu Maymuru-White	b. 1952	Yirrkala, Australia	lives in Yirrkala
Mohamed Melehi	1936–2020	Asilah, Morocco	lived in Paris, France
Carlos Mérida	1891–1985	Guatemala City	lived in Mexico City
Gladys Mgudlandlu	(1917–1926?)–1979	Peddie, South Africa	lived in Cape Town
Omar Mismar	b. 1986	Bekaa Valley, Lebanon	lives in Beirut
Sabelo Mlangeni	b. 1980	Mpumalanga, South Africa	lives in Johannesburg
Tina Modotti	1896–1942	Udine, Italy	lived in Mexico City
Bahman Mohasses	1931–2010	Rasht, Iran	lived in Rome
Roberto Montenegro	1885–1968	Guadalajara, Mexico	lived in Mexico City
Camilo Mori Serrano	1896–1973	Valparaíso, Chile	lived in Santiago, Chile
Ahmed Morsi	b. 1930	Alexandria, Egypt	lives in New York
Effat Naghi	1905–1994	Alexandria, Egypt	
Ismael Nery	1900–1934	Belem, Brazil	lived in Rio de Janeiro
Malangatana Valente Ngwenya	1936–2011	Matalana, Mozambique	lived in Matosinhos, Portugal
Paula Nicho	b. 1955	Comalapa, Guatemala	lives in Comalapa
Costantino Nivola	1911–1988	Orani, Italy	lived in East Hampton, NY
Taylor Nkomo	b. 1957	Bulawayo, Zimbabwe	lives in Harare, Zimbabwe
Marina Núñez del Prado	1910–1995	La Paz, Bolivia	lived in Lima
Philomé Obin	1892–1986	Bas-Limbé, Haiti	
Sénèque Obin	1893–1977	Limbé, Haiti	
Alejandro Obregón	1920–1991	Barcelona	lived in Cartagena, Colombia
Tomie Ohtake	1912–2015	Kyoto	lived in São Paulo
Uche Okeke	1933–2016	Nimo, Nigeria	
Marco Ospina	1912–1983	Bogotá, Colombia	
Samia Osseiran Junblatt	b. 1944	Saida, Lebanon	lives in Bramiyeh, Lebanon
Daniel Otero Torres	b. 1985	Bogotá, Colombia	lives in Paris
Lydia Ourahmane	b. 1992	Saïda, Algeria	lives in Algiers and Barcelona
Pan Yuliang	1895–1977	Yangzhou, China	lived in Paris
Dalton Paula	b. 1982	Brasília, Brazil	lives in Goiânia, Brazil
Amelia Peláez	1896–1968	Yaguajay, Cuba	lived in Havana
George Pemba	1912–2001	Port Elizabeth, South Africa	lived in Eastern Cape, South Africa
Fulvio Pennacchi	1905–1992	Villa Collemandina, Italy	lived in São Paulo
Claudio Perna	1938–1997	Milan, Italy	lived in Holguín, Cuba
Emilio Pettoruti	1892–1971	La Plata, Argentina	lived in Paris
Lê Phổ	1907–2001	Hanoi, Vietnam	lived in Paris
Bona Pieyre De Mandiargues	1926–2000	Rome, Italy	lived in Paris
Ester Pilone	1920–?	Cuneo, Italy	
La Chola Poblete	b. 1989	Mendoza, Argentina	lives in Buenos Aires
Charmaine Poh	b. 1990	Singapore	lives in Berlin and Singapore
Maria Polo	1937–1983	Venice, Italy	lived in Rio de Janeiro
Candido Portinari	1903–1962	Brodowski, Brazil	lived in Rio de Janeiro
Sandra Poulson	b. 1995	Lisbon, Portugal	lives in Luanda, Angola, and London, Biennale College Arte
B. Prabha	1933–2001	Maharashtra, India	lived in Nagpur, India
Lidy Prati	1921–2008	Resistencia, Argentina	lived in Buenos Aires
Puppies Puppies (Jade Guanaro Kuriki-Olivo)	b. 1989	Dallas, Texas	lives in New York
Lee Qoede	1913–1965	Chilgok, South Korea (colonial Korea)	Lived in North Korea
Agnes Questionmark	b. 1995	Rome, Italy	lives in Rome and New York, Biennale College Arte
Violeta Quispe	b. 1989	Lima, Peru	lives in Lima
Alfredo Ramos Martinez	1871–1946	Monterrey, Mexico	lived in Los Angeles
Sayed Haider Raza	1922–2016	Madhya Pradesh, India	lived in Delhi
Armando Reverón	1889–1954	Caracas, Venezuela	
Emma Reyes	1919–2003	Bogotá, Colombia	lived in Bordeaux, France
Diego Rivera	1886–1957	Guanajuato City, Mexico	lived in Mexico City
Juana Marta Rodas	1925–2003	Itá, Paraguay	
Laura Rodig Pizarro	1896/1901–1972	Los Andes, Chile	lived in Santiago, Chile
Abel Rodríguez	b. 1941	Cahuinarí, Colombia	lives in Bogotá
Aydeé Rodriguez Lopez	1955	Cuajinicuilapa, Mexico	lives in Cuajinicuilapa
Freddy Rodriguez	1945–2003	Santiago de los Caballeros, Dominican Republic	lived in New York
Miguel Ángel Rojas	b. 1946	Bogotá, Colombia	lives in Bogotá
Rosa Rolanda	1896–1970	Azusa, CA	lived in Mexico City
Jamini Roy	1887–1972	Bengal, India	lived in Calcutta
Rómulo Rozo	1899–1964	Bogotá, Colombia	lived in Mérida, Mexico
Erica Rutherford	1923–2008	Edinburgh, Scotland	lived in Charlottetown, Canada
José Sabogal	1888–1956	Cajabamba, Peru	lived in Lima
Mahmoud Sabri	1927–2012	Baghdad, Iraq	lived in Maidenhead, England
Syed Sadequain	1930–1987	Amroha, India	lived in Karachi, Pakistan
Nena Saguil	1914–1994	Manila, Philippines	lived in Paris
Mahmoud Saïd	1897–1964	Alexandria, Egypt	
Kazuya Sakai	1927–2001	Buenos Aires, Argentina	lived in Dallas
Ione Saldanha	1919–2001	Alegrete, Brazil	lived in Rio de Janeiro
Dean Sameshima	b. 1971	California, United States	lives in Berlin
Zilia Sánchez	b. 1926	Havana, Cuba	lives in San Juan, Puerto Rico
Bárbara Sánchez-Kane	b. 1987	Mérida, Mexico	lives in Mexico City
Name Sanguineti Poggi	1909–2012	Savona, Italy	lived in Finale Ligure, Italy
Fanny Sanín	b. 1938	Bogotá, Colombia	lives in New York
Aligi Sassu	1912–2000	Milan, Italy	lived in Pollença, Spain
Greta Schödl	b. 1929	Hollabrunn, Austria	lives in Bologna, Italy
Ana Segovia	b. 1991	Mexico City, Mexico	lives in Mexico City
Gerard Sekoto	1913–1993	Botshabelo, South Africa	lived in Nogent-sur-Marne, France
Jewad Selim	1919–1961	Ankara, Turkey	lived in Baghdad
Lorna Selim	1928–2021	Sheffield, England	lived in Abergavenny, Wales
Joshua Serafin	b. 1995	Bacolod, Philippines	lives in Brussels
Kang Seung Lee	b. 1978	Seoul, South Korea	lives in Los Angeles
Gino Severini	1883–1966	Cortona, Italy	lived in Paris
Amrita Sher-Gil	1913–1941	Budapest, Hungary	lived in Lahore, India
Anwar Jalal Shemza	1928–1985	Shimla, India	lived in Stafford, England
Yinka Shonibare	b. 1962	London	lives in London
Doreen Sibanda	b. 1954	Derby, England	lives in Harare, Zimbabwe
Fadjar Sidik	1930–2004	Surabaya, Indonesia	lived in Yogyakarta, Indonesia
Gazbia Sirry	1925–2021	Cairo	
Lucas Sithole	1931–1994	KwaThema, South Africa	lived in Spekboom, South Africa
Francis Newton Souza	1924–2002	Saligao, India	lived in Mumbai
Joseph Stella	1877–1946	Muro Lucano, Italy	lived in New York
Irma Stern	1894–1966	Schweizer-Reneke, South Africa	lived in Cape Town
Leopold Strobl	b. 1960	Mistelbach, Austria	lives in Mistelbach
Emiria Sunassa	1894–1964	Tanahwangko, Indonesia	lived in Lampung, Indonesia
Superflex	founded 1993	Copenhagen	based in Copenhagen
Armodio Tamayo	1924–1964	La Paz, Bolivia	
Maria Taniguchi	b. 1981	Dumaguete, Philippines	lives in Manila
Evelyn Taocheng Wang	b. 1981	Chengdu, China	lives in Rotterdam
Lucy Tejada	1920–2011	Pereira, Colombia	lived in Cali, Colombia
Mariana Telleria	b. 1979	Rufino, Argentina	lives in Rosario, Argentina
Güneş Terkol	b. 1981	Istanbul	lives in Istanbul
Eduardo Terrazas	b. 1936	Guadalajara, Mexico	lives in Mexico City
Clorindo Testa	1923–2013	Benevento, Italy	lived in Buenos Aires
Salman Toor	b. 1983	Lahore, Pakistan	lives in New York
Frieda Toranzo Jaeger	b. 1988	Mexico City	lives in Mexico City and Berlin
Horacio Torres	1924–1976	Livorno, Italy	lived in New York
Joaquin Torres-Garcìa	1874–1949	Montevideo, Uruguay	
Mario Tozzi	1895–1979	Fossombrone, Italy	lived in Saint-Jean-du-Gard, France
Twins Seven Seven	1944–2011	Ijara, Nigeria	lived in Ibadan, Nigeria
Ahmed Umar	b. 1988	Sudan	lives in Oslo, Norway
Unidentified Chilean women artists			Arpillera
Rubem Valentim	1922–1991	Salvador, Brazil	lived in São Paulo
Edoardo Daniele Villa	1915–2011	Bergamo, Italy	lived in Johannesburg
Eliseu Visconti	1866–1944	Giffoni Valle Piana, Italy	lived in Rio de Janeiro
Alfredo Volpi	1896–1988	Lucca, Italy	lived in São Paulo
Kay WalkingStick	b. 1935	Syracuse, NY	lives in Pennsylvania
WangShui	b. 1986	Dallas	lives in New York
Agnes Waruguru	b. 1994	Nairobi, Kenya	lives in Nairobi
Barrington Watson	1931–2016	Lucea, Jamaica	lived in Kingston, Jamaica
Osmond Watson	1934–2005	Kingston, Jamaica	
Susanne Wenger	1915–2009	Graz, Austria	lived in Osogbo, Nigeria
Emmi Whitehorse	b. 1956	New Mexico	lives in New Mexico
Selwyn Wilson	1927–2002	Taumarere, New Zealand	lived in Kawakawa, Northland, New Zealand
Chang Woosoung	1912–2005	Chungju-si, South Korea	lived in Seoul
Celeste Woss y Gil	1891–1985	Santo Domingo, Dominican Republic	
Xiyadie	b. 1963	Shaanxi, China	lives in Shandong, China
Rember Yahuarcani	b. 1985	Pebas, Peru	lives in Pebas and Lima, Peru
Santiago Yahuarcani	b. 1960	Pebas, Peru	lives in Pebas
Nil Yalter	b. 1938	Cairo	lives in Paris
Joseca Mokahesi Yanomami	b. 1971	Yanomami Indigenous Territory, Brazil	lives in Yanomami Indigenous Territory
André Taniki Yanomami	b. 1949	Yanomami Indigenous Territory, Brazil	lives in Yanomami Indigenous Territory
Yêdamaria	1932–2016	Salvador, Brazil	
Ramses Younan	1913–1966	Minya, Egypt	lived in Cairo
Kim YunShin	b. 1935	Wonsan, Korea	lives in Buenos Aires and Seoul
Fahrelnissa Zeid	1901–1991	Büyükada, Turkey	lived in Amman, Jordan
Anna Zemánková	1908–1986	Olomouc, Moravia	lived in Prague
Bibi Zogbé	1890–1975	Sahel Alma, Lebanon	lived in Mar del Plata, Argentina
