= Obin (surname) =

Obin is a surname. Notable people with the surname include:

- Jean-Marie Obin, Haitian painter, daughter of Philomé Obin
- Jérémy Obin (born 1993), French footballer
- Louis-Henri Obin (1820–1895), French opera singer
- Philomé Obin (1892–1986), Haitian painter
- Sénèque Obin (1893–1977), Haitian painter
