= Emmi Whitehorse =

Native American painter and printmaker (born 1957)

- Born: 1957; Crownpoint, New Mexico
- Education: University of New Mexico
- Known for: Painting, Drawing, Printmaking, Monoprinting
- Movement: Contemporary art, Abstract art

Movement by Emmi Whitehorse, 1989, Honolulu Museum of Art

Emmi Whitehorse (born 1957) is a Native American painter and printmaker. She was born in Crownpoint, New Mexico and is a member of the Navajo Nation. She lives in Santa Fe, New Mexico.

== Life and career ==
Whitehorse grew up on the open land northeast of Gallup, New Mexico in a family where only the Navajo language was spoken.

"Whitehorse was born into a family whose livelihood depended largely on rearing sheep. Through herding sheep and exploring nearby ruins, she developed an interest in light affects our perception of the environment--how clouds darken canyons, sunlight illuminates small flora and fauna, and the horizon line dissolves with dusk. She was also struck by the colors that emerge from weaving and its associated activities."

In 1980, Whitehorse earned her Bachelor of Arts degree in painting from the University of New Mexico in Albuquerque (UNM). She earned her master's degree in art in 1982, also from UNM, majoring in printmaking and minoring in art history.

Whitehorse's paintings draw upon a personal iconography, based on her reflections of her natural surroundings. She brings together Navajo cosmological perspectives with abstraction in her work. Whitehorse's work is deliberately apolitical. She has described her work as having a sense of chaos and randomness, and said that when she paints she is continually moving the paper around "so I have no idea which way is top and which way is bottom when I paint." Whitehorse credits her grandmother, a weaver, as the most influential artistic figure in her life. More generally, she also draws on Navajo methods of making dry paintings and weavings in her work. Her paintings are usually oil on paper, mounted on canvas, such as Movement, in the collection of the Honolulu Museum of Art. This work, from 1989, demonstrates the luxuriant, atmospheric, and meditative abstractions for which she is known. Her work is represented in numerous public collections throughout North America, Europe, Japan, Uzbekistan and Morocco including the Brooklyn Museum of Art, Heard Museum, Eiteljorg Museum of American Indians and Western Art, Muscarelle Museum of Art, and the Whitney Museum of American Art.

In 2024, Whitehorse was featured in the Central Exhibition of the Venice Biennale, "Foreigners Everywhere." In this context, the Biennale's artistic director, Adriano Pedrosa, presented Whitehorse as an indigenous artist (in his words) "frequently treated as a foreigner in his or her own land." She contributed landscape paintings such as Cópia (2023) with strong ecocritical and anti-colonialist themes. Press coverage of the 2024 Venice Biennale, including the New York Times review, especially focused on Whitehorse and her prominent role in the exhibition.

== Selected solo exhibitions ==
- 2006 Boulder Museum of Contemporary Art, Boulder, CO
- 2004-05 Soul Weaving, KC Jewish Museum, Overland Park, KS
- 2001 Joslyn Art Museum, Omaha, NE
- 1997 Tucson Museum of Art, Tucson, AZ
- 1993 Millicent Rogers Museum, Taos, NM
- 1991 Neeznáá, The Wheelwright Museum, Santa Fe, NM
- 1988 Yuma Art Center, Yuma, AZ
- 1982 Sun Valley Center for Arts & Humanities, Sun Valley, ID

== Selected group exhibitions ==
- 2024: Venice Biennale, Central Exhibition, "Foreigners Everywhere"
- 2021: Shared Ideologies at the Muscarelle Museum of Art in Williamsburg, VA.
- 2019: Hearts of Our People: Native Women Artists. Minneapolis Institute of Art, Minneapolis, MN
- 2012: Celebrating Diversities in Art. Springfield Art Museum, Springfield, MO
- 2011: Modern Times: Kunst der Indianischen Moderne und Postmoderne aus der Sammlung Peiper-Reigraf. Galerieverein Leonberg, Leonberg, Germany
- 2011: Pressing Ideas: 50 Years of Women's Lithographs from Tamarind. National Museum of Women in the Arts, Washington, D.C.
- 2011: Trio: Whitehorse, Cunningham, Fields. Chiaroscuro Contemporary Art, Santa Fe, NM
- 2010: Into the Void: Abstract Art. Autry Museum of the American West, Los Angeles, CA
- 2008-09: Maverick Art. Autry Museum of the American West, Los Angeles, CA
- 2008: Common Ground: Art in New Mexico. Albuquerque Museum of Art, NM
- 2007: Unlimited Boundaries: Dichotomy of Place in Contemporary Native American Art, Albuquerque Museum of Art, NM
- 2007: Off The Map: Landscape in the Native Imagination. National Museum of the American Indian, Smithsonian Institution, New York, NY
- 2005: Rolling Thunder: Art from the Plains, Foothills Art Center, Golden, CO
- 2004: Expanded Visions: Four Woman Artists print the American West, Autry Museum, Los Angeles, CA
- 2003-04: Uncommon Legacies: Native American Art from the Peabody Essex Museum, Stanford University, Stanford, CA,
- Cincinnati Art Museum, Cincinnati, OH,
- Virginia Museum of Fine Arts, Richmond, VA,
- Peabody Essex Museum, Salem, MA
- 2002-05: New Classics, Denver Art Museum, CO
- 2002: Common Ground: Contemporary Native American Art from the TMA Permanent Collection and Private Collections, Tucson Museum of Art, Tucson, AZ
- 2002: Western Visions: Pop, Perspective and Politics, Center for the Visual Arts, Metropolitan State College of Denver, CO
- 2001: Multiple Impressions: Native American Artist and the Print, traveling exhibition from the Tamarind Institute, Albuquerque, NM
- 2000: New Art of the West 7, Eiteljorg Museum, Indianapolis, IN New Prints 2001, International Print Center, New York, NY
- 1998: Group Show, Margo Jacobsen Gallery, Portland, OR
- 1997: Contemporary New Mexico Artists: Sketches Schemas, SITE Santa Fe, NM
- 1996-97: Contemporary Art in New Mexico, SITE Santa Fe, NM
- 1996: New Art of the West 5, Eiteljorg Museum, Indianapolis, IN
- 1995: Westtfalisches Museum, Munster, Germany
- 1994: American Academy of Arts and Letters, Purchase Exhibition, New York, NY
- 1993: Indianer Nord-Amerikas: Kunst und Mythos, Internationale Tage, Ingelheim, Germany. Of Paper and Glass, Millicent Rogers Museum, Taos, NM
- 1991: Presswork, The Art of Women Printmakers, National Museum of Women in the Arts, Washington, DC (traveling show)
- 1990: Primavera, Tucson Museum of Art, Tucson, AZ
- Centro Cultural de la Raza, Balboa Park, San Diego, CA
- 1989: Six from Santa Fe, Gibbs Museum of Art, Charleston, SC
- 1988: Mask, The Old Pueblo Museum, Tucson, AZ
- 1987: Fort Wayne Museum of Art, Fort Wayne, IN
- 1985: Eight Artists, The Southwest Museum, Los Angeles, CA
- Women of the American West, Bruce Museum, Greenwich, CT
- 1984: She Holds Her Own, The Green County Council on the Arts, Catskill, NY
- Contemporary Native American Art Exhibition, Oklahoma State University, Stillwater, OK
- 1982: Modern Native American Abstraction, The Philadelphia Art Alliance Gallery, Philadelphia, PA (traveling show)
- 1981: Confluences of Configuration and Change, Nelson Gallery, University of California, Davis, CA
- Museum of the Southwest, Midland, TX
- The A.I.C.H. Gallery, NY, NY
- The Brunnier Gallery, Iowa State University, Dubuque, IA
- Grey Canyon Group, The Heard Museum, Phoenix, AZ
- Works on Paper, University of New Mexico, Albuquerque, NM (traveling show)
- 1980: Grey Canyon Group, University of North Dakota, Grand Forks, ND
- The Southern Plains Museum, Anadarko, OK
- The Sioux Land Heritage Museum, Sioux Falls, SD
- Galleria de Cavalina, Venice, Italy
- Wheelwright Museum, Santa Fe, NM (traveling show)
- 1979: Grey Canyon Group, Gallery Upstairs, Berkeley, CA
- Downtown Center for the Arts, Albuquerque, NM (traveling show)

== Bibliography ==
- Zorn, Elayne L. Encyclopedia of Native American Artists, 2008.
- Hill, Richard, William J. Rushing, and Roger Matuz. St. James Guide to Native North American Artists. Detroit [Mich.: St. James Press, 1998.
