= Mahku - Huni Kuin Artists Movement =

Indigenous artist and research collective from Brazil

MAHKU
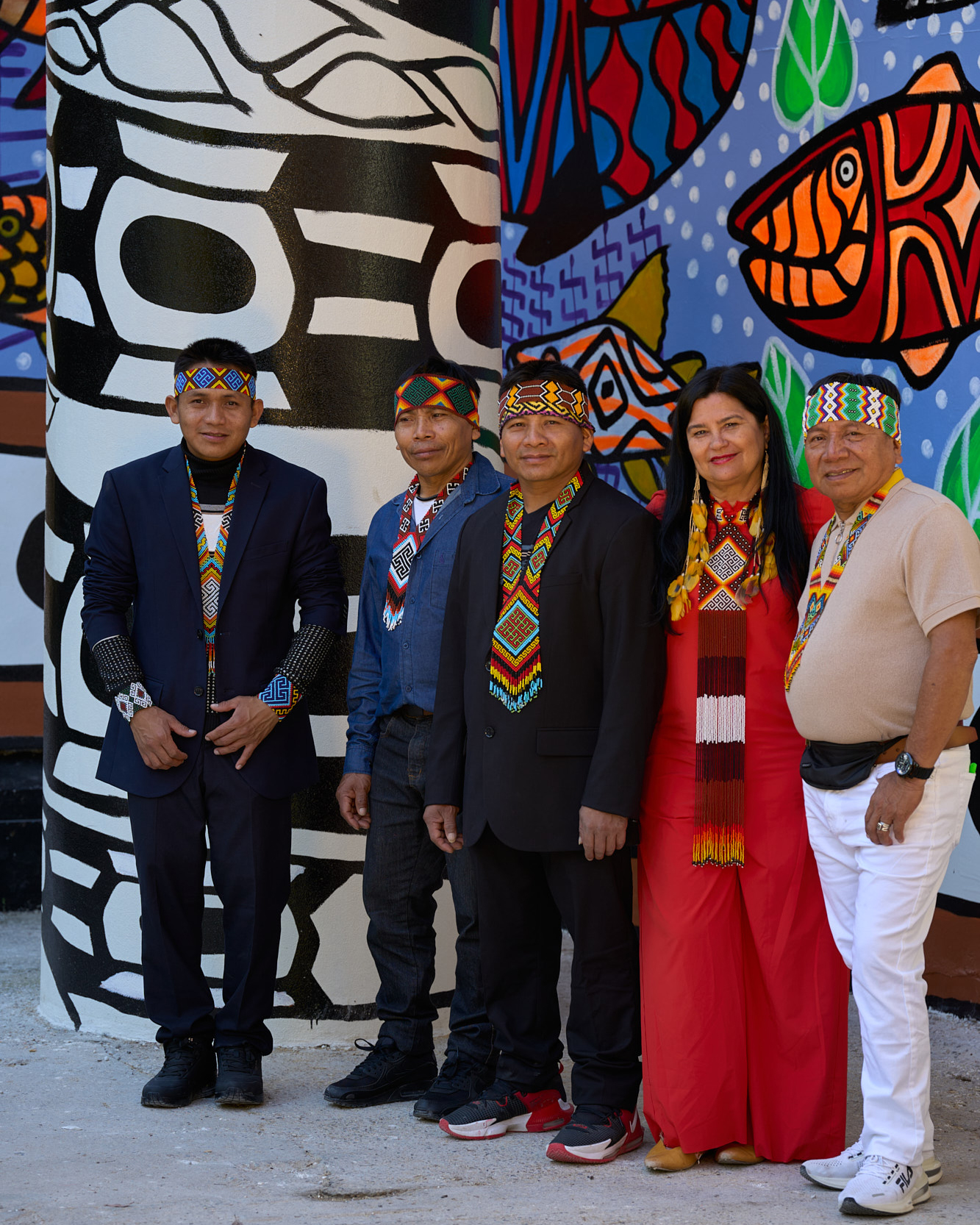
- At the Biennale di Venezia 2024
- Citizenship: (Brazil) Brazilian
- Notable work: Kapewë Pukeni (2024)
- Style: Indigenous art

The Huni Kuin Artists Movement (MAHKU) is a group composed of Huni Kuin artists and researchers, an Indigenous people living in the Brazilian Amazon, between the state of Acre and Peru. The group's origins are linked to Ibã Sales Huni Kuin's research on the Huni Meka, ayahuasca chants in the Hãtxa Kuin language. The artists seek to transform and create bridges with the non-indigenous through murals, drawings, and paintings, hence building alliances and strengthening their own strategies of autonomy. The group is constituted by founder Ibã Huni Kuin, Kássia Borges, Acelino Tuin, Cleiber Bane, Pedro Maná, Yaka Huni Kuin, Rita Huni Kuin, Cleudo Txana Tuin, and Isaka Huni Kuin, represented by the Carmo Johnson Projects gallery

== Origins ==
In the early 2000s, leaders amongst the Huni Kuin people, especially Ibã, began conducting workshops to translate Huni Kuin chants, myths and practices into drawings, involving his son Bane, nephew Acelino and relative Maná. Many of MAHKU's works are visual translations and interpretations of Huni Meka chants, traditional knowledge accompanying Nixi Pae rituals utilizing ayahuasca, a tea composed of amazonian vegetation with hallucinogenic potential, used for centuries by varied South American tribes.

In Huni Kuin iconography, the area of uncertainty between dreams and myths is often depicted through geometric framing that is adapted according to the artwork's structure and imagery, guaranteeing free expression and autonomy within a non-linear story. Within the Miração(vision's) perimeter, there are no hierarchies between the represented beings, as the threshold between abstraction and figuration loses all meaning. What we find is the result of an image-process, stemming from dialogue and learning among those involved, whose ultimate goal is healing, both for the artist and the observer interpreting it, allowing a spiritual experience.

The group seeks to build bridges between Indigenous and non-Indigenous worlds, between the visible and the invisible. Through partaking in exhibitions, the group has found sustainable paths in extending traditional lifestyle, setting in motion alligators, snakes, and vine teas, therefore disseminating its myths, stories, and art.

== Career ==
In 2012, Ibã, along with anthropologist Amilton Pelegrino de Mattos, professor at the Federal University of Acre, decided that the group's work had the means to expand beyond Acre, creating a blog and sharing it with those who might be captivated by Indigenous culture, not limited to other anthropologists. In the same year, the blog reached both curator and anthropologist Bruce Albert, and artistic director Hervé Chandès at Fondation Cartier pour l'Art Contemporain, inviting the founder to participate in Histoires de voir, Show and Tell.

In 2014, MAHKU's work was selected for the exhibition Made by... Made by Brazilians, curated by Marc Pottier, at the former Matarazzo Hospital in São Paulo. Ibã, Bane, and Isaka painted panels on the walls of three rooms and, at the end of the event, sold their first piece, a 5-meter canvas. The proceeds from this sale were invested in the purchase of the first 125 acres of land. Since then, they have sold about 15 works, but in smaller sizes and values, and more lands have been bought.

In 2017, the collective launched at the 35th Panorama of Brazilian Art, curated by Luiz Camillo Osorio, the Ibã Huni Kuin Wall Project(Isaías Sales), who is a txana, master of chants in the tradition of the Huni Kuin people. This led to the creation of The Spirit of the Forest Project, curated by Ibã and his son, exploring the Huni Kuin imaginary through unorthodox storytelling given western parameters.

In 2018, the exhibition Through the Poetics of MAHKU was held with artists Ibã Huni Kuin and Bane Huni Kuin. Curated by Roberta Paredes and Amilton Pelegrino, the works exhibited at the Arts Gallery of the Federal University of Amazonas were part of the Spirit of the Forest project collection.

In 2020, they launched the exhibition Vaivém at the Bank of Brazil's Cultural Center, in Belo Horizonte. Curated by Raphael Fonseca, the produced canvas was inspired by the concept the exhibition's central theme; that peoples emerge from intricate social webs, that cycles of life and death occur in such webs, and that their existence allow for the survival of traditions, as Amerindian culture is narrated through webs of storytelling, acting as a societal cornerstone.

In 2021, Carmo Johnson Projects Gallery in São Paulo began representing MAHKU, presenting work in the exhibition Everything is Dangerous, Divine, and Wonderful, curated by Daniel Dinato. The demonstration sought to engage in dialogue between the collective's representation of ancestral strength in myths and chants with Bruno Novelli's hybrid imaginary of beasts and tropical landscapes.

In 2022, they launched the exhibition Chants of Images, curated by Ibã Huni Kuin and Daniel Donato, being co-produced between Casa de Cultura do Parque and Carmo Johnson Projects. The paintings and installation were complemented by the experience of Huni Meka chants, demonstrated live during the event. Later that year, the group presented the exhibition MAKHU: Sells Paintings, Buys Land at the SBC Contemporary Art Gallery in Montreal. Curated by Ibã Huni Kuin and Daniel Dinato, the central theme relied on the use visual art as a weapon in the struggle for the political, ecological, and cultural autonomy of the Huni Kuin people.

In 2023, they launched the exhibition Mirações (Visions) at São Paulo Museum of Art, which brought together about 120 paintings and drawings on paper and canvas, three of them produced for the show, commissioned by the museum, as well as sculptures, audio recordings of chants, a documentary video, and a large-scale painting directly elaborated on the sides of the museum's red staircase. In the same year, the group presented Choreographies of Impossible at the 35th São Paulo Art Biennial. It consisted of a series of eighteen newly commissioned paintings, each 220 centimeters wide by 260 centimeters high, arranged side by side in a semicircular format that covered the closing of the purple floor's ramp in continuing format.

=== Venice Biennale ===
In 2024, the collective was invited to participate in the 60th International Art Exhibition of the Venice Biennale: Stranieri Ovunque - Foreigners Everywhere, by Brazilian curator Adriano Pedrosa.

The group gained prominence by presenting a 750-square-meter painting on the facade of the Biennale's central pavilion in the Giardini, titled Kapewë Pukeni (alligator-bridge), engulfing the viewer in the Huni Kuin's myth of origin. The myth tells the tale about the intercontinental separation between peoples and the consolidation of Huni Kuin identity. Kapewë Pukeni thus becomes a central image in reinforcing ties between foreigners worldwide and in the role of art as a means of resistance.
