= WangShui =

Artist

WangShui (born 1986) is an American contemporary artist. They work across a range of media including film, installation, painting, and sculpture. They are based in New York City.

== Notable exhibitions ==
In 2018, WangShui participated in In Practice: Another Echo at SculptureCenter in Queens. That same year they presented a film project at Triple Canopy titled, From Its Mouth Came a River of High-end Residential Appliances that eventually went on to screen at New York Film Festival and International Film Festival Rotterdam.

In 2019, WangShui presented their first solo exhibition at the Julia Stoschek Collection in Berlin.

In 2021, WangShui participated in No Humans Involved at the Hammer Museum in Los Angeles and also presented their first series of aluminum paintings at Frieze New York.

In 2022, WangShui participated in the 2022 Whitney Biennial titled "Quiet as It's Kept" where they presented videos and paintings co-authored with AI. Their work was also included in the Biennale De Lyon that same year.

In 2023, WangShui opened their first solo museum exhibitions in China at the Rockbund Art Museum and in Europe at Haus Der Kunst.

In 2024, WangShui's work was included in the 60th La Biennale di Venezia, "Stranieri Ovunque - Foreigners Everywhere" curated by Adriano Pedrosa.
