= Obin =

Obin may refer to:

- Obin (designer), real name Josephine Komara (born 1955), Indonesian textile designer
- Obin (surname), French surname (includes a list of people with the name)
