= Gbadegesin =

Gbadegesin is a surname. Notable people with the surname include:

- Tariye Gbadegesin, Nigerian-American businesswoman
- Adeniyi Sulaimon Gbadegesin (born 1958), Nigerian academic
- Sàngódáre Gbádégesin Àjàlá (1948–2021), Nigerian artist
- Ajibade Gbadegesin Ogunoye III (born 1966), Nigerian ruler
