= Nour Jaouda =

Libyan visual artist

- Born: 1997 (age 28–29); Cairo, Cairo Governorate, Egypt
- Education: Ruskin School of Art; Royal College of Art
- Known for: Textile art and sculpture
- Notable work: Dust that never settles (2024); The Light in Between (2024)
- Style: Contemporary
- Website: https://nourjaouda.com/

Nour Jaouda (born 1997) is a Libyan textile artist, whose work was selected to be part of Foreigners Everywhere the main art exhibition of 60th edition of the Venice Biennale. Three textile works inspired by her Libyan grandmother's fig trees, the poetry of Mahmoud Darwish and natural dying practices were exhibited. In 2024, the work Dust that never settles by Jaouda was acquired by The Hepworth Wakefield, funded by the Contemporary Art Society. At the same time her work The Light in Between was acquired by the Arts Council Collection.

Working between London and Cairo, Jaouda's practice is inspired by Islamic prayer mats, geopolitics, architecture and memory. She has an undergraduate degree from Ruskin School of Art and an MA from the Royal College of Art. At the former she was the inaugural winner of its Emery Prize. Her first solo exhibition was held at the contemporary art gallery, Union Pacific, in 2023. Her first institutional solo show is due to open at Spike Island in September 2025. She was one of the eighteen finalists for the 2024 Baloise Art Prize. Her work hs been compared to Sheila Hicks, Faith Ringgold, and Charlotte Colbert. She was named one of London's most exciting young artists by the Evening Standard.
