= La Chola Poblete =

Argentinian artist (born 1989)

La Chola Poblete (born 1989 Mendoza ) is an Argentinian multidisciplinary artist and activist. She is known for sculpture, painting, performance art, drawing, photography, and video art. Her art primarily focuses on femininity, queerness and indigenous roots. She resides in Buenos Aires.

== Early life and education ==
La Chola Poblete was born in 1989 in the city of Guaymallén, in Mendoza, Argentina. She is of Bolivian heritage, and is trans. She was raised in a matriarchal family by a single mom and multiple aunts. Before she took on the identity of La Chola Poblete she spent her formative years as a non-binary indigenous teenager.

She received a bachelors degree and teaching degree in visual arts at the National University of Cuyo in Mendoza.

La Chola Poblete moved in 2017 to Buenos Aires, where she performed as a member of the Comparsa Drag art collective.

== Works and awards ==
=== Deutsche Bank Award (2023) ===
La Chola Poblete won the Deutsche Bank Artist of the Year award. This exhibition Guaymallén, named after her home city, is a tribute to the artist’s indigenous roots and queer identity. Through this exhibition, La Chola Poblete addresses the historical roles of women and trans people, in which she explains how femininity is often persecuted and ostracized by ideologies that are patriarchal and religious.

=== Stranieri Ovunque (2024) ===
The 60th Venice Biennale in 2024 she showed her work Stranieri Ovunque, as part of the exhibition series, Foreigners Everywhere. This is the first time the work of La Chola Poblete was presented her work there. She states “I am the first trans and brown artist from Argentina to reach the Biennale". La Chola Poblete’s watercolors showcase the fluidity that comes from how she identifies and sees her own identity. Within these works La Chola Poblete highlights The Virgin as a multifaceted icon as the centerpiece of her works. The Virgin embodies the connection between Western culture and indigenous communities that La Chola Poblete wants to portray.

=== Ejercicios del Llanto (2022) ===
This solo exhibition titled Ejercicios del llanto [Exercises in Weeping] was presented by Museo De Arte Moderno de Buenos Aires (Museum of Modern Art, Buenos Aires). La Chola Poblete wanted this exhibition to be a tribute to the intimacy of having a diary. She created all the works from this exhibition between 2014 and 2015 when she was having a dilemma regarding her own gender. Within the art works presented she expresses her roots and allusions of sexuality. The form of the diary can be seen as conception of the artist's convictions.
