= Selden Rodman =

American poet

- Born: Cary Selden Rodman; February 19, 1909; New York City
- Died: November 2, 2002 (aged 93); Ridgewood, New Jersey
- Education: Loomis Academy, Yale University
- Spouse(s): Eunice Clark (1), Hilda Clausen (2), Maia Wojciechowska (3), Carole Cleaver (4)
- Children: Oriana, Carla, Van Nostrand

Cary Selden Rodman (February 19, 1909 – November 2, 2002) was a prolific American writer of poetry, plays and prose, political commentary, art criticism, Latin American and Caribbean history, biography and travel writing—publishing a book almost every year of his adult life, he also co-edited Common Sense magazine.

== Biography ==
=== Background ===
Born on February 19, 1909, to architect Cary Selden Rodman and Nannie Van Nostrand (Marvin). He had one sibling, Nancy Gardiner Macdonald, who married Dwight Macdonald in 1934. He attended The Loomis Institute and Yale University. With William Harlan Hale, he was founder and editor of the campus magazine The Harkness Hoot (1930–31). Following university, he edited, with Alfred Mitchell Bingham, the political monthly Common Sense (1932–43). He served as Master Sgt. O.S.S. in the U.S. Army (1943–45).

=== Poet and anthologist ===
Rodman was first published as a poet in 1932. Mortal Triumph and Other Poems was followed by narrative poems and the verse play The Revolutionists in 1942. His last book of poetry, Death of a Hero, published in 1964, imagines the scene of the plane crash and death of Sir Frederick Banting, discoverer of insulin, and was illustrated by the artist, Seymour Leichman.

Editor of seminal anthologies, A New Anthology of Modern Poetry, was 'the first anthology of its kind to include Negro folk-songs, light verse and satire, choruses from the experimental theater and a sound-track from a pioneer movie'. 100 American Poems included lyric, epic and ballad works from colonial times through 1948.

=== Common Sense ===
Selden Rodman and Alfred Bingham co-edited the socialist magazine for around a decade between 1932 and 1943. Serving as a monthly periodical with the mission statement "A monthly magazine of positive social action devoted to the elimination of war and poverty through democratic planning for abundance," Common Sense saw the likes of contributors such as Charles A. Beard, Thomas Hart Benton, Upton Sinclair, and others. They published articles with a wide range from historical reviews of arguments, opinionated editorials, general news articles, poetry, book and periodical reviews, advertisements for socialist pamphlets, and reader responses to previous editions. Selden and Alfred communicated virtually daily on the issues that were pertinent to the months edition, whom to have write a piece, how radical they wanted to make the magazine, what other periodicals were producing, and how to address those issues if needed.

== Personal and death ==
Rodman married his first wife, Eunice Clark, in 1933, and his second wife, Hilda Clausen, in 1938. In 1950 he married Maia Wojciechowska and their daughter Oriana, was born in 1951. He married Carole Cleaver in 1962 and with her had two children, Carla and Van Nostrand.

He died on November 2, 2002, in Ridgewood, New Jersey.

== Legacy ==
=== Popular art and Haiti ===
Regarding self-taught, naïve, and primitive artists he admired, Rodman said, '...by their intuitive grasp of the principles of composition, color, and accommodation to the flatness of the picture-plane, (they) achieve the same quality of timelessness as the Masters. There is the same sense of arrested mobility; the same transformation of the humble into the noble, the here-and-now into forever.'

The 1946 monograph, Horace Pippin, A Negro Painter in America, was the first book ever published about the black, self-taught, American artist, and the biography, Horace Pippin, The Artist as a Black American, was the first biography of the artist.

Renaissance in Haiti, published in 1948, was the first book about Haitian art and the artists who were to become the first generation of the art movement in Haiti, including the vodum priest, Hector Hyppolite and popular realist, Philome Obin. Working alongside DeWitt Peters, founder of the Centre d' Art, Rodman initiated and directed the mural paintings in the Episcopal Cathedral Ste. Trinite in Port-au-Prince. The cathedral and murals were destroyed in the earthquake of 2010.

Haiti, The Black Republic was published in 1954 and Rodman continued writing about Haiti throughout his life. He maintained a home in Jacmel, Haiti in the 1980s and 90's where he spent the winters with his family and ran a gallery called 'Renaissance II'.

While writing a series of travel and history books in the 1960s and 1970s, Rodman visited Mexico, Central and South America and the Caribbean, adding works of popular art to his collection. In 1983 Ramapo College in Mahwah, NJ, accepted the gift of The Selden Rodman Collection of Popular Art whose range included 'self-taught' and 'outsider' artists from North America as well.

=== Conversations and journals ===
Several of Rodman's books were collections of conversations he had with literary and art figures of his time, including, among many others, Robert Frost, Ernest Hemingway and Norman Mailer in Tongues of Fallen Angels, and Joseph Glasco, Jackson Pollock, Willem de Kooning, Mark Rothko, David Smith, Philip Johnson, Frank Lloyd Wright, Alexander Calder, Edward Hopper, Leonard Baskin and others in Conversations with Artists.

His journals, dating from 1938 to 2000, contain handwritten accounts of his personal life, travels, and conversations with writers and artists which were later used for many published works. The Selden Rodman Papers are housed in the Yale University Library Manuscripts and Archives.

=== Humanist ===
The first paragraph of The Insiders, published in 1960, reads, 'We live in an apocalyptic age, but we are not the first to do so. Apocalyptic periods before us have produced great works of the spirit—works which signaled an emergence from the darkness. Other times of crisis yielded supinely and left the record of their despair in the labyrinthine decoration or tinkling symbol.'

Throughout his life and writings, Rodman fiercely argued for artists to search '...for images of truth that will be meaningful to his contemporaries.' And concluded, 'The value of the finished product will be determined finally by the judgement of those to whose hearts it addresses itself.'

== Works ==
- Mortal Triumph and Other Poems – 1932
- A New Anthology of Modern Poetry – 1938
- The Revolutionists, A Verse Play – 1942
- Horace Pippin, A Negro Painter in America – 1947
- Renaissance in Haiti – 1948
- Haiti: The Black Republic – 1954
- The Eye of Man – 1955
- Conversations with Artists – 1957
- Mexican Journal: The Conquerors Conquered - 1958
- The Insiders – 1960
- The Heart of Beethoven – 1962
- Death of the Hero – 1964
- The Mexico Traveler – 1969
- South America of the Poets – 1970
- Tongues of Fallen Angels – 1972
- Horace Pippin, The Artist as a Black American, with Carole Cleaver – 1972
- The Miracle of Haitian Art – 1974
- Genius in the Backlands – 1977
- Artists in Tune with Their World – 1982
- Where Art is Joy, Haitian Art: The First 40 Years – 1988
- Geniuses & Other Eccentrics – 1997

== External sources ==
- Strassel, Annemarie (2003). "Selden Rodman Papers". Yale University.
- Common Sense October 1939
- University of Wyoming American Heritage Center Collection 4259 "Selden Rodman Papers" Box 1 Folders 26–7
