= Lauren Halsey =

African-American artist (born 1987)

- Born: 1987 (age 38–39); Los Angeles, California, U.S.
- Education: California Institute of the Arts (BFA); Yale University (MFA)
- Occupation: Artist
- Style: Contemporary art
- Website: www.laurenhalsey.com

Lauren Halsey (b. 1987 Los Angeles, California) is a contemporary American artist. Halsey uses architecture and installation art to demonstrate the realities of urban neighborhoods like South Central, Los Angeles.

== Early life and education ==
Halsey was born in 1987 in Los Angeles, California. She initially wanted to be a professional basketball player.

Halsey graduated in 2005 from the Los Angeles Center for Enriched Studies. For five years she attended El Camino Community College in Torrance, California. She later studied at the California Institute of the Arts (CalArts) – where her teachers included Charles Gaines – from 2008 to 2012, earning a BFA, and then Yale University from 2012 to 2014, earning an MFA.

== Work ==
Halsey counts among her greatest influences the artists Betye Saar, Overton Loyd, Mike Kelley, Dominique Moody and Mark Bradford. She describes her work as an attempt to "summon a world suffused with an ethos of funk." She mentions that a common theme of her art is to represent her community of South Central LA and representations of her family.

From 2012 to 2014, Halsey worked with colleagues on a project titled Harlem Postcards, which was presented at The Studio Museum in Harlem. It was during this time. that Halsey completed her thesis exhibition at the California Institute of the Arts and began the program at Yale University. In 2015 Halsey was included in the United, exhibition at Coney Island Art Walls. The same year she was included in the exhibition Everything, Everyday at the Studio Museum along with fellow Artists-in-Residence Sadie Barnette (also a CalArts alum) and Eric Mack. In 2016, she made a float for the Kingdom Day Parade in Los Angeles.

In 2018, Halsey had a solo exhibition at Louis Vuitton Foundation, Paris. Also in 2018, she participated in a solo exhibition at the Museum of Contemporary Art (MOCA). Her work was at the Hammer Museum. New to the L.A. art scene, Halsey was awarded the Mohn Award in 2018. She won the Frieze Artist Award in 2019.

Halsey was included in the 2019 traveling exhibition Young, Gifted, and Black: The Lumpkin-Boccuzzi Family Collection of Contemporary Art.

In July 2020, Halsey collaborated with Korina Matyas, a childhood friend and environmentalist to start Summaeverythang, an initiative to bring organic produce to underserved neighborhoods in L.A. Summaeverythang donated an average of 600 boxes of organic produce every week throughout the 2020 season.

In 2021, the Museum of Fine Arts, Boston commissioned Halsey to create a work for its Banner Project. “These banners are, in the words of the artist, “fantastical cartographies”—maps that trace heritage from the African continent to the contemporary Black and African-American diasporas in the United States.”

the eastside of south central los angeles hieroglyph prototype architecture (I) (2023) at the Metropolitan Museum of Art

Halsey was commissioned by the Metropolitan Museum of Art in 2022 as the tenth artist to design an outdoor work for the museum's Iris and B. Gerald Cantor roof garden. The planned exhibition was postponed to 2023 due to residual logistics delays from the COVID-19 pandemic. Halsey designed the eastside of south central los angeles hieroglyph prototype architecture (I) (2022–2023), an open-air cubic pavilion inspired by Egyptian architecture, surrounded by four sphinx statues and several free-standing columns. The white walls of the pavilion and columns were extensively etched with phrases, names, drawings, logos, and historical references from and about black culture, with many specifically referencing Halsey's community in South Central, Los Angeles. The sphinx sculptures and other busts of people featured throughout the pavilion were based on Halsey's friends and family, including her mother Glenda. The installation was on display from April to October 2023; following the exhibition, Halsey announced plans to permanently relocate the work to South Central. Writing in The New York Times, critic Holland Cotter described the piece as "a kind of space station/sanctuary," calling it "one of the best" of the museum's roof garden commissions.

=== keepers of the krown, 2024 ===
keepers of the krown (2024) at the 60th Venice Biennale

In 2024 Halsey created an outdoor installation for the 60th Venice Biennale's main exhibition Foreigners Everywhere. Similar to her previous architectural works, Halsey's installation keepers of the krown (2024) featured several tall white columns decorated with faces and extensive etched drawings and text referencing people and places in Halsey's community. The columns were installed with three similarly decorated white benches outside the main Arsenale building.

=== sister dreamer, 2026 ===
Halsey's largest project, sister dreamer: lauren halsey’s architectural ode to tha surge n splurge of south central los angeles is a temporary sculpture park installed in 2026 at Western Avenue and 76th Street in South Central Los Angeles. Organized by the Los Angeles Nomadic Division (LAND), the year-long installation combined contemporary urban imagery with references to ancient Egypt and Africa. The park featured eight Hathoric columns, eight sphinxes, fountains, benches, and native plantings. Columns were topped with representations of community activists including Margaret Prescod, Susan Burton, and Rosie Lee Hooks.

The park occupies the former site of Gwen’s Ice Cream, a neighborhood landmark destroyed by fire in 2014. Open daily from sunrise to sunset, it hosts poetry readings, yoga workshops, and film screenings. Financial support came in part from the Andrew W. Mellon Foundation, with contributions from artists including Charles Gaines, Rashid Johnson, Mickalene Thomas, and Julie Mehretu, as well as Brad Pitt, LeBron James, and Will Ferrell.

== Collections ==
Lauren Halsey's work is featured in several museum collections across the United States. Halsey's work "lil e-man" (2024), from the series emajendat, is featured in the collection of the Pérez Art Museum Miami, Florida, it was on display in the Get in the Game: Sports, Art, Culture exhibition, which traveled from the San Francisco Museum of Modern Art (SFMOMA), California, between 2025 and 2026.

== Other activities ==
=== Nike ===
In 2019, Halsey collaborated with Nike on a customer Air Force Sneaker in her "Summaeverything" aesthetic with the design. Halsey's collection for Nike consisted of sneakers, socks, and t-shirts. The shoes are a remixed version of the brand's Air Force 1 High style.

=== Community initiatives ===
Part of Halsey's practice has entailed contributing back to the neighborhood. In 2020, Halsey facilitated the "Summaeverythang Community Center", a community initiative which, during the COVID-19 pandemic, provided organic fruits, vegetables and other resources to locals in need. Halsey funded the initiative through personal savings and donations on the Summaeverythang website.

== Awards ==
California Institute of Arts awarded Halsey The Beutner Family Award of Excellence in the Arts in 2011. Halsey was awarded the Skowhegan School of Painting and Sculpture scholarship for emerging artist in 2014. In 2014–15, Halsey was part of the Studio Museum in Harlem's Artist-in-Residence program. She was recognized for transforming the Mezzanine Gallery with a site-specific installation for her exhibition titled Everything, Everyday. Halsey is the recipient of the Rema Hort Mann Foundation Emerging Artist grant, 2015. She received the William H. Johnson Price in 2017. Also in 2017, she was awarded the Edge Award from the Los Angeles Design Festival. In 2018, Halsey received $100,000 for the Mohn Award to honor her artistic excellence. In 2019, Halsey was named the winner of the Frieze Art, for which she received $25,000 from the Luma Foundation to create a new work for the following edition of Frieze New York art fair. Also in 2019, Halsey was the recipient of the 2019 Painter and Sculptors Grant from the Joan Mitchell Foundation, New York. In 2021, she received the Gwendolyn Knight | Jacob Lawrence Prize from the Seattle Art Museum.

== Art market ==
Halsey has been represented by Gagosian Gallery (since 2023) and David Kordansky Gallery (since 2018).
