= Isaac Chong Wai =

Isaac Chong Wai (Chinese 莊偉) is a Hong Kong-Berlin artist. He uses video, installation, drawing, photography, and performance as his main mediums. In 2024, he is a participating artist at the Venice Biennale curated by Adriano Pedrosa.

== Exhibitions ==
=== 2025 ===
- "Isaac Chong Wai: carefully", Blindspot Gallery, Hong Kong

=== 2023 ===
- 22nd Biennial Sesc_Videobrasil, Associação Cultural Videobrasil and Sesc, São Paulo
- “The Nationalgalerie: The Collection of the 21st Century,” Hamburger Bahnhof–Nationalgalerie der Gegenwart Museum, Berlin
- "Breath by Breath," Liste Art Fair Basel, Basel

=== 2022 ===
- “Identity Not Proven,” New Acquisitions for the Federal Art Collection, Bundeskunsthalle Bonn, Bonn

=== 2020 ===
- “Looking For Another Family,” National Museum of Modern and Contemporary Art (MMCA), Seoul
- “Ordinary Heroes: Made in Hong Kong,” IFFR International Film Festival Rotterdam, Rotterdam

==== 2019 ====
- “Living Sound—Expanding the extramusical," Museum of Contemporary Art (MOCA), Taipei

==== 2018 ====
- “M+ Live Art Audience As Performer,” M+ Museum, Hong Kong
- “KOTODAMA,” Para Site, Hong Kong

== As a subject ==
Chong Wai has also appeared as the subject of work by other artists. Chinese figurative painter Liu Xiaodong (b. 1963), considered one of the foremost realist painters of his generation, depicted Chong Wai in an oil painting titled Isaac with His Walking Stick (2018, oil on canvas). Liu Xiaodong is known for painting friends and fellow artists in their own everyday environments, spending extended time with each subject to produce large-scale oil portraits of striking intimacy and specificity. The painting shows Chong Wai reclining on a bed, a walking stick resting nearby, imagery that connects to the recurring engagement with bodily vulnerability and care that runs through Chong Wai's own artistic practice.
