= Common Sense (American magazine) =

American political magazine

- Categories: Politics
- Founder: Selden Rodman and Alfred M. Bingham
- Founded: 1932
- Final issue: 1946
- Country: United States
- Based in: New York City

Common Sense was a monthly political magazine named after the pamphlet by Thomas Paine and published in the United States between 1932 and 1946. It was headquartered in New York City.

== History ==
Common Sense was founded in 1932 by two Yale University graduates, Selden Rodman, and Alfred M. Bingham, son of United States Senator Hiram Bingham III. Its contributors were mostly progressives from a wide range of the left-right spectrum, from agrarian populists, "insurgent" Republicans and Farmer-Labor Party activists to independent progressives, Democrat mavericks and democratic socialists; in general they opposed the Leninist-Stalinist authoritarian American Communist Party and abhorred its wrecker tactics. Their "socialism" tended to the typically non-Marxist indigenous American tradition exemplified by Henry George, Edward Bellamy, Laurence Gronlund, Eugene Debs, Frederic C. Howe, Thorstein Veblen, Robert La Follette, Sr. Politically, the magazine tended to support progressive independent political action in favor of the interests of the general welfare of the American commonwealth at large as distinguished from metropolitan corporate financial elites. In 1934 Bingham & Rodman published a selection of essays representing the magazine's wide-ranging response to the depths of the first trough of the Great Depression in America, Challenge To The New Deal (New York, Falcon Press, 1935), an important witness to the era's progressive political thought outside the metropolitan partisan establishment.

The magazine attracted a broad range of contributors, typically independents, diversely progressive, including Thomas Ryum Amlie, Roger N. Baldwin, Charles A. Beard, Carleton Beals, V. F. Calverton, John Chamberlain, Stuart Chase, Bronson Cutting. Miriam Allen DeFord, Lawrence Dennis, John Dewey, John Dos Passos, Paul Douglas, Theodore Dreiser, Henry Pratt Fairchild, John T. Flynn, J. B. S. Hardman, Morris Hillquit, Sidney Hook, Robert La Follette, Jr., Philip La Follette, Fiorello La Guardia, Jay Lovestone, Mary McCarthy, Claude McKay, H. L. Mencken, Dwight Macdonald, Vito Marcantonio, Lewis Mumford, A. J. Muste, George W. Norris. Gerald Nye, Floyd Olson, Milo Reno, James Rorty, Bertrand Russell, Howard Scott, Upton Sinclair, Jerry Voorhis, Mary Heaton Vorse, Charles W. Yost, Stephen Spender, Robert F. Wagner, Burton Wheeler, and Edmund Wilson.

In his book The Politics of Upheaval, Arthur M. Schlesinger, Jr. stated that during the early New Deal years of the Great Depression, Common Sense became "the most lively and interesting forum of radical discussion in the country." In 1946 the magazine was absorbed by The American Mercury.

== Quotations ==
Major General Smedley Butler of the United States Marine Corps, in one of his most widely quoted statements, declared in a 1935 issue of the magazine:

"I spent 33 years and four months in active military service and during that period I spent most of my time as a high class muscle man for Big Business, for Wall Street and the bankers. In short, I was a racketeer, a gangster for capitalism. I helped make Mexico and especially Tampico safe for American oil interests in 1914. I helped make Haiti and Cuba a decent place for the National City Bank boys to collect revenues in. I helped in the raping of half a dozen Central American republics for the benefit of Wall Street. I helped purify Nicaragua for the International Banking House of Brown Brothers in 1902-1912. I brought light to the Dominican Republic for the American sugar interests in 1916. I helped make Honduras right for the American fruit companies in 1903. In China in 1927 I helped see to it that Standard Oil went on its way unmolested. Looking back on it, I might have given Al Capone a few hints. The best he could do was to operate his racket in three districts. I operated on three continents."

The "Facts and Fancies" column in the May 1935 issue of Common Sense (p. 25) included this item from Senator Robert La Follette, Jr., based on statistics from a 1926 Federal Trade Commission study:

"If the population of the United States were one hundred, and the total wealth were one hundred dollars, the following would be the proportions of ownership: One man would have fifty-nine dollars, one man would have nine dollars, twenty-two men would have one dollar and twenty-two cents, and seventy-six men would have less than seven cents each."
