= Maria Taniguchi =

Artist based in Philippines

Maria Taniguchi (born 1981, Dumaguete City, Philippines) is a visual artist based in Manila, Philippines. Her work focuses on concepts of composing, constructing and framing, while referring to the craftsmanship and history of the Philippines. She was the winner of the Hugo Boss Asia Art Award in 2015.

== Early life and education ==
After graduating from the Philippine High School for the Arts in Mt. Makiling, Laguna, Taniguchi received a BFA in Sculpture in 2007 from the University of the Philippines College of Fine Arts, Diliman. She then completed an MFA in Art Practice at Goldsmiths in London in 2009 where she was influenced by artists such as Paul Pfeiffer.

== Work and exhibitions ==
Taniguchi is best known for her monumental brick paintings, which she began producing in 2007. The ongoing series of work Untitled (2008- ) takes the form of large-format canvases, untitled and unnumbered, covered in a meticulous arrangement of hand-painted bricks. The paintings comprise a record of passing time and a means of regulating her own production. In addition, she works across a diverse range of media including video, installation, sculpture, pottery, printmaking, drawing and writing.

Writing in Leap Magazine, scholar Chantal Wong describes Taniguchi as "an archeologist piecing together artifacts, unpacking knowledge and experience connecting material culture, technology and natural evolution."

As a young artist, Taniguchi was featured in the program of the independent artist-run space Green Papaya. She has gone on to be included in important group exhibitions like Don't You Know Who I Am? Art After Identity Politics curated by Anders Kreuger at M HKA, Antwerp in 2014, the 8th Asia Pacific Triennial of Contemporary Art in Brisbane in 2015, and Global: New Sensorium curated by Yuko Hasegawa for ZKM Centre for Art and Media in 2016. In 2020, Taniguchi was commissioned by National Gallery Singapore to complete a site-specific project in the first season of the OUTBOUND project.

Her brick paintings from the on-going series Untitled (2008- ) have been acquired by institutions such as M+ Museum in Hong Kong, Tate Modern, Centre Pompidou, the Art Gallery of Western Australia and GoMA in Brisbane.

In 2024, her work was shown at the Venice Biennial 60th International Art Exhibition, Stranieri Ovunque - Foreigners Everywhere, curated by Adriano Pedrosa.

== Awards ==
Taniguchi has received several awards, including the Ateneo Art Award (for her solo exhibition Echo Studies in 2011 at the Jorge Vargas Museum, and again in 2012 for her video Untitled (Celestial Motors) shown at Silverlens, Manila. Taniguchi won the 2015 Hugo Boss Asia Art Award for Emerging Asian Artists at the Rockbund Art Museum in Shanghai. Larys Frogier, chair of the jury, said “[Taniguchi's] very singular, humble, but extremely focused practice of painting and video enriched the realm of media and raised a unique sensitivity of making the picture with infinite possibilities of meaning.”
