= Kang Seung Lee =

South Korean artist (born 1978)

Kang Seung Lee (Korean: 이강승; born 1978) is a South Korean contemporary artist who lives and works in Los Angeles, California.

== Education ==
He received an MFA from California Institute of the Arts.

== Work ==
Lee's practice examines themes of identity, community, and collective memory, frequently addressing the legacy of transnational queer histories as they intersect with art history.

Lee’s work has been included in a number of international exhibitions such as Singapore Biennale (2025-2026), the 60th Venice Biennale (2024); Made in LA at Hammer Museum (2023); New Museum Triennial (2021); and 13th Gwangju Biennale (2021) among others.

== Collections ==
Lee's work is in the permanent collections of Amore Pacific Museum of Art, Seoul; Busan Museum of Art; Cantor Arts Center at Stanford University; Getty Research Institute, Los Angeles; Hammer Museum, Los Angeles; Los Angeles County Museum of Art; RISD Museum, Providence; Seoul Museum of Art; Solomon R. Guggenheim Museum; São Paulo Museum of Art; Singapore Art Museum; National Museum of Modern and Contemporary Art, Korea; Kadist Foundation; Leeum Museum of Art, Seoul; The Frances Young Tang Teaching Museum and Art Gallery at Skidmore College, Saratoga Springs; Whitney Museum of American Art, New York; among others.
