= Xiyadie =

Chinese artist (born 1963)

- Born: 27 August 1963 (age 63); Shaanxi, China
- Website: www.xiyadie.com

Xiyadie (born August 27, 1963) (Zhee-ya-dee; in English: "Siberian Butterfly") is a Chinese artist. He is known for using traditional Chinese paper cutting to incorporate themes of gay identity, personal struggle, family relationships and societal critique.

== Early life and background ==
Xiyadie was born on August 27, 1963, in a small village in Shaanxi province in northwestern China. His family were farmers. Xiyadie grew up in a conservative environment based on traditional values. Whilst he is often described as a "self-taught" artist, Xiyadie's mother taught him the folk art of Chinese paper cutting.

From an early age, Xiyadie was aware of his attraction to men. He fell in love with a former male classmate and had a brief romantic encounter with him. However, due to societal pressure, he married a woman. Together, they had two children, a daughter (born 1991) and a son (born 1989) and who had cerebral palsy. Homosexuality was decriminalised in China in 1997, but was considered a mental illness until 2001, and attitudes have remained ambivalent after this. Xiyadie's work Sewn (1999) "describes his difficulty in accepting his sexuality while trapped in a heterosexual marriage". His love for his former classmate, as well as a second man with whom he had an affair, caused him great distress, as well as guilt for his wife. Xiyadie says that he "really wanted to be with the man I loved, I was afraid to. I thought I had a sickness… I felt very very painful, but also happy. So I did my life in paper cuttings." Xiyade remained married to his wife and he came out to her, but his village and children are not aware of his sexuality.

Following his family, Xiyadie initially became a farmer. In 2005, Xiyadie moved to Beijing as a migrant worker (as a cleaner, handyman and cook), where he found more acceptance in the gay art community.

== Work ==
Xiyadie is the artist's alias, meaning "Siberian Butterfly", "a beautiful creature that survives in the harshest conditions – to reflect his personal and artistic evolution." He uses the alias to mask his identity.

Xiyadie uses Chinese paper cutting, a popular craft traditionally practiced by women (often referred to as a "matriarchs art") and used to decorate windows and doorways to bring prosperity into the home. Xiyadie saw as a means to connect with his ancestry while exploring his identity and discussing queer themes and experiences. The animals, houses and other symbols in his work mostly come from folk art symbols that bring good luck. Xiyadie often uses xuanzhi paper, which is traditionally used in Chinese calligraphy and ink-wash painting. Once cut, the paper is hand-painted with food colouring (more commonly used in baking bao buns to identify their fillings).

Xiyadie's early works were mostly set in interior settings. Upon arriving in Beijing in 2005, he started to create works set in cruising sites he found there.

== Career ==
=== Early career ===
Xiyadie, having created paper cuttings since childhood, began his work as a professional artist in the 1980s. He had incorporated queer sex scenes in his work prior to this, as early as the late 1970s. Xiyadie's work was criticised by China's contemporary art gatekeepers for its obscenity and perceived irrelevance. As a result, he has rarely shown his work domestically.

The first time Xiyadie exhibited his work in mainland China, police raided the gallery, confiscating all other work apart from Xiyadie's because they thought it was good.

In 2010, Xiyadie had his first solo exhibition at the Beijing LGBT Center.

Alongside his practice, Xiyadie worked in the Crafts department of the Xi’an Film Studio.

=== 2017, 2019, 2023: Spectrosynthesis ===
In 2017, Xiyadie participated in Spectrosynthesis: Asian LGBTQ Issues and Art Now at MOCA Taipei. Tatler Asia (as well as elsewhere) said that the exhibition was "the first exhibition dedicated to LGBTQ issues to go on show at an art museum in Asia". The exhibition took place following Taiwan's approval of same-sex marriage. Patrick Sun, founder of Sunpride Foundation who co-sponsored the exhibition, said that there were few gay Asian artists, and they particularly wanted to find out about the older generation of gay artists, as they were less likely to want to be "out" in fear of stigmatisation. Whilst Taiwan (where the exhibition was held) was considered the most accepting place in Asia for homosexuals at the time, MOCA anticipated negative reactions to the exhibition and set up a protest area for critics.

Spectrosynthesis was held a second time in 2019, as SPECTROSYNTHESIS II – Exposure of Tolerance: LGBTQ in Southeast Asia, again supported by the Sunpride Foundation. The exhibition featured 58 artists (including Xiyade) reflecting on LGBTQ issues in Southeast Asia.

=== Biennales ===
In 2018, Xiyadie participated at the Gwangju Biennale. In 2019, he participated in the Ljubljana Bienniale of Graphic Arts.

In 2024, Xiyadie participated in the 60th Venice Biennale, in the Arsenale.

=== Other activities ===
Xiyade is represented by Blindspot Gallery, Hong Kong. He has exhibited twice at their own gallery including in 2022 for Soy Dreams of Milk, a group exhibition of six East Asian artists exploring "experiences of migration, movement, and diasporic worlding".

== Exhibitions ==
=== Solo ===
Year	Title	Institution	Location	Ref
2010	Xiyadie	Beijing LGBT Center	Beijing	
2012	Metamorphosis of a Butterfly: A Kaleidoscope Vision of Life by a Gay Chinese Artist	Flazh!Alley Art Studio	San Pedro, US	
2018	Cut Sleeve, Split Peach	NOME	Berlin	
2023	Queer Cut Utopias	Drawing Center	New York City	
2024	Xiyadie: Butterfly Dream	Blindspot Gallery	Hong Kong	

=== Group ===
Year	Title	Festival	Institution	Location	Notes	Ref
2009	Difference-Gender				LGBTQ Chinese artists	
			Richard Saltoun Gallery			
2012	Secret Love		Museum of Far Eastern Antiquities	Stockholm		
2013	Secret Love		Museum of World Culture	Gothenburg		
2015	Secret Love		Topenmuseum	Amsterdam		
2015		Antwerp Queer Arts Festival	Galerie Verbeeck - Van Dyck	Antwerp		
2017	In Search of Miss Ruthless		Para Site	Hong Kong		
2017	Spectrosynthesis: Asian LGBTQ Issues and Art Now		MOCA	Taipei		
2018	Imagined Borders	The 12th Gwangju Biennale		Gwangju		
2019	Postcentral		NOME Gallery	Berlin		
2019	An Opera for Animals		Rockbund Art Museum	Shanghai		
2019	SPECTROSYNTHESIS II – Exposure of Tolerance: LGBTQ in Southeast Asia		Bangkok Art and Culture Centre (BACC0	Bangkok		
2019	Crack Up – Crack Down	The 33rd Ljubljana Biennial of Graphic Arts	Tivoli Mansion	Ljubljana		
2020	Crack Up – Crack Down		Ujazdowski Castle Centre for Contemporary Art	Warsaw		
2020	Nome, A Lexicon		NOME Gallery	Berlin		
2022	Transacations with Eternity		Kraupa-Tuskany Zeidler	Berlin		
2022	Ceremony (Burial of an Undead World)		HKW	Berlin		
2022	Soy Dreams of Milk		Blindspot Gallery	Hong Kong		
2022	神話製造者——光．合作用 III Myth Makers — Spectrosynthesis III		Tai Kwun Contemporary	Hong Kong		
2023	Eros		P21 Gallery	Seoul		
2023	Walking China: Stories yet to be told		ICA NYU	Shanghai		
2023	Dancing Forward, Looking Backward		Kunsthal Gent	Ghent	Exhibition by Curatorial Studies Class 2022-23	
2023	Contemporary Queer Chinese Art: A Buried Voice					
2024	Foreigners Everywhere	60th Venice Biennale	Arsenale	Venice		
2024	Jorinde Voigt & Xiyadie		P21 Gallery	Seoul		

== Collections ==
Xiyadie's work is held in collections including:

- Tate
- Columbus Museum of Art
- KADIST
- Museum of Fine Arts, Boston
- Museu de Arte de São Paulo
- Spencer Museum of Art, University of Kansas
- Sunpride Foundation (Hong Kong)

== Personal life ==
Xiyadie's first boyfriend was Minghui, a train attendant.

Xiyadie lives and works in Shaanxi province, China.
