= Amadeo Luciano Lorenzato =

Brazilian painter (1900–1995)

Lorenzato
- Born: 1900; Belo Horizonte, Brazil
- Died: 1995 (aged 94–95); Belo Horizonte, Brazil
- Style: Primitivism
- Movement: Modernism

Amadeo Luciano Lorenzato (1900 – 1995), better known as Lorenzato was a Brazilian modernist artist. His painting portrays landscape and everyday life in tropical savanna during Minas Gerais urbanization. Lorenzato's paintings also have a very characteristic pattern made by the use of vivid colors mixed with an adapted comb that left shades and texture at the canvases.

== Early life and education ==
Born in 1900 in Belo Horizonte to Italian immigrants, Lorenzato began working as a painter's assistant at a very early age. However, in the late 1920s, due to the outbreak of Spanish flu that hit Brazil, Lorenzato and his family returned to Italy, where he became a wall painter in the reconstruction of the town of Arsiero, destroyed during the First World War.

A self-taught artist, he educated himself in the major renaissance historical movements, and after a short enrollment at the Reale Accademia delle Arti in Vicenza in 1925, he engaged at a year-long cycling trip across Europe with a Dutch painter that he had met, Cornelius Keesman. At this life-changing trip, they had a chance to expand their horizons as encountering works by artists such as Matisse and Picasso.

In 1948, after World War II, he returned to Brazil and settled in Rio de Janeiro, where he worked at the Hotel Quitandinha. The savings ensured the return to Brazil of his wife, Emma Casprini, and the couple's son. In 1950, he returned to Belo Horizonte, where he began working in construction.

== Career ==
It was only after sustaining an injury to his leg in 1956 that Lorenzato committed himself to full time painting, and settled back into Belo Horizonte where he developed most of his work.

Lorenzato's celebrated paintings, which had been dubbed "Modernism Operario-Campones (Labor-Rural Modernism)", initially received little attention. His painting reflected everyday life, and his creative process involved long walks around his home and in the countryside, making drawings and sketches that he would later translate into paintings from memory.

“I leave home, pick up a piece of paper and draw on it, then I note down the colours more or less and then, when I have the scale models, I paint. I have to see the landscape and the things thereon. If I do not see it, then I am unable to paint” - Lorenzato

Lorenzato's compositions used a rich palette of self-made pigments to describe his surroundings by reduced geometric forms and richly textured surfaces that were filled with veers into abstraction through the use of handmand tools, usually brushes, combs, and forks.

In 2014, Lorenzato's work was featured in two solo exhibitions at Galeria Estação and Bergamin & Gomide in São Paulo, organized by artists Alexandre da Cunha and Rivane Neuenschwander.
