= Jean-Marie Obin =

Jean-Marie Obin is a Haitian artist. She is from a family of painters and is the daughter of the painter Philomé Obin.

Philomé was instrumental in developing Obin's artistic style. Obin's style often depicts the daily life of Haitians, with her work featuring the Vodou religion, Haitian history, and the landscape of Haiti. Her art includes abstracts of Haitian life and Haiti's landscape. These portray rural and urban scenes, along with domestic activities and ceremonial events of Haitians.

== Principal expositions or works ==
- Le Snem en Action Chez Boss Djo (dimensions: 20" by 24") The Le Snem en Action Chez Boss Djo is gouache on Masonite. The image depicts Haitian workers participating in daily activities.
- Le Retour Des Jardiniers (dimensions: 7 7/8" by 16") The Le Retour Des Jardiniers is an oil painting. The image depicts a young man, a young boy, and a donkey carrying stock.

== See also ==
- Waterloo Center for the Arts
