= Philomé Obin =

Haitian artist (1892–1986)

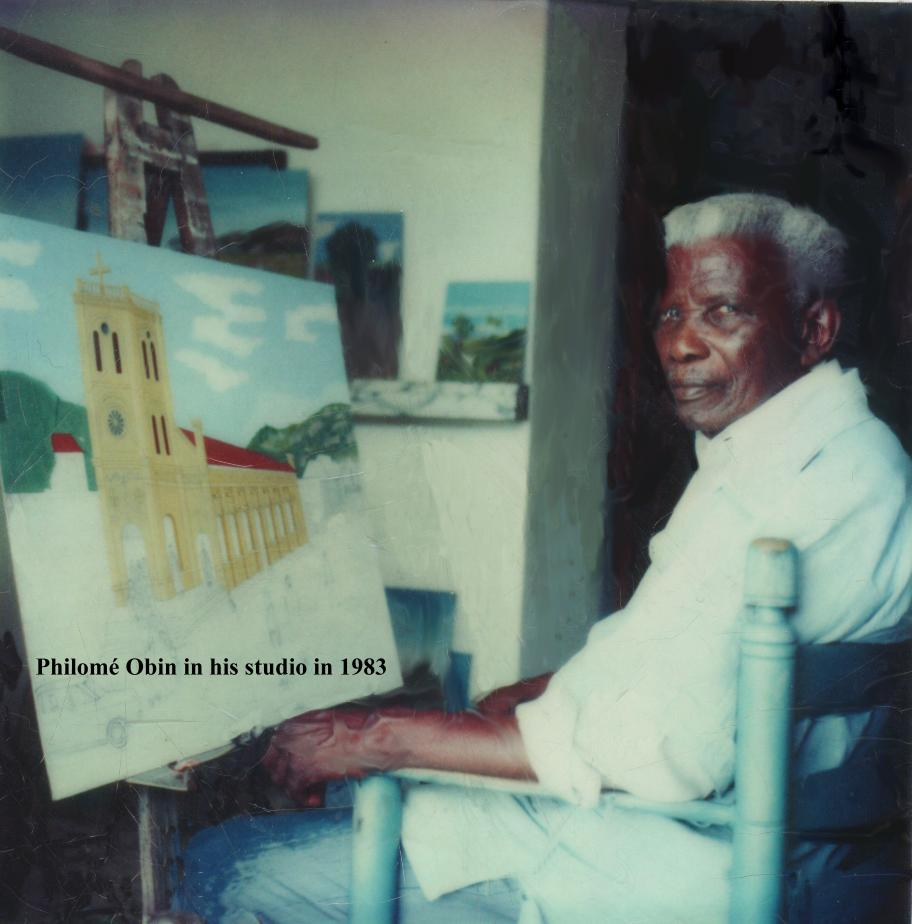
- Philomé Obin in his studio in 1983
- Born: July 20, 1892; Bas Limbé, Haiti
- Died: August 6, 1986 (aged 94)
- Other name: Philome Obin
- Children: Jean-Marie Obin
- Relatives: Sénèque Obin (brother)

Philomé Obin (July 20, 1892 – August 6, 1986) was a Haitian painter. He produced his first painting in 1908 at the age of 16, and was an active artist for 75 years. Obin is considered one of the greatest Haitian artists of the 20th century.

== Biography ==
=== Early life and education ===
Philomé Obin was born on July 20, 1892, in Bas Limbé, Haiti; he was the third child of Obénard Obin and his wife (whose name is not known). His father was a tailor. He received rudimentary instruction in drawing as a boy and produced his first known painting when he was 16 in 1908.

Obin was self-taught, and painted in his spare time as a barber and coffee buyer.

After his death, his children discovered evidence in his documents that he was a Captain in the Haitian army before the American Occupation, which began in 1915.

=== Early career ===
Most of the paintings of Obin's first half-century—often on cardboard, sometimes on Masonite—are lost. His style of representations of Haitian street scenes or visions from Haitian history was not of interest to middle-class Haitians, who preferred works that aped French paintings. Obin also painted murals and other decorative pieces for commercial establishments, fraternal organizations, and Protestant chapels in the beginning.

=== Centre d'Art and success ===
In 1944, a Centre d'Art was opened in Port-au-Prince, Haiti's capital, by Dewitt Peters, an American Quaker and conscientious objector who had been sent to Haiti by the U.S. Office of Education as an alternative to World War II military service. Peters, also an artist, was hoping to promote Haitian art, inspired by the works he had seen decorating voodoo temples, or ounfò (French: humfor).

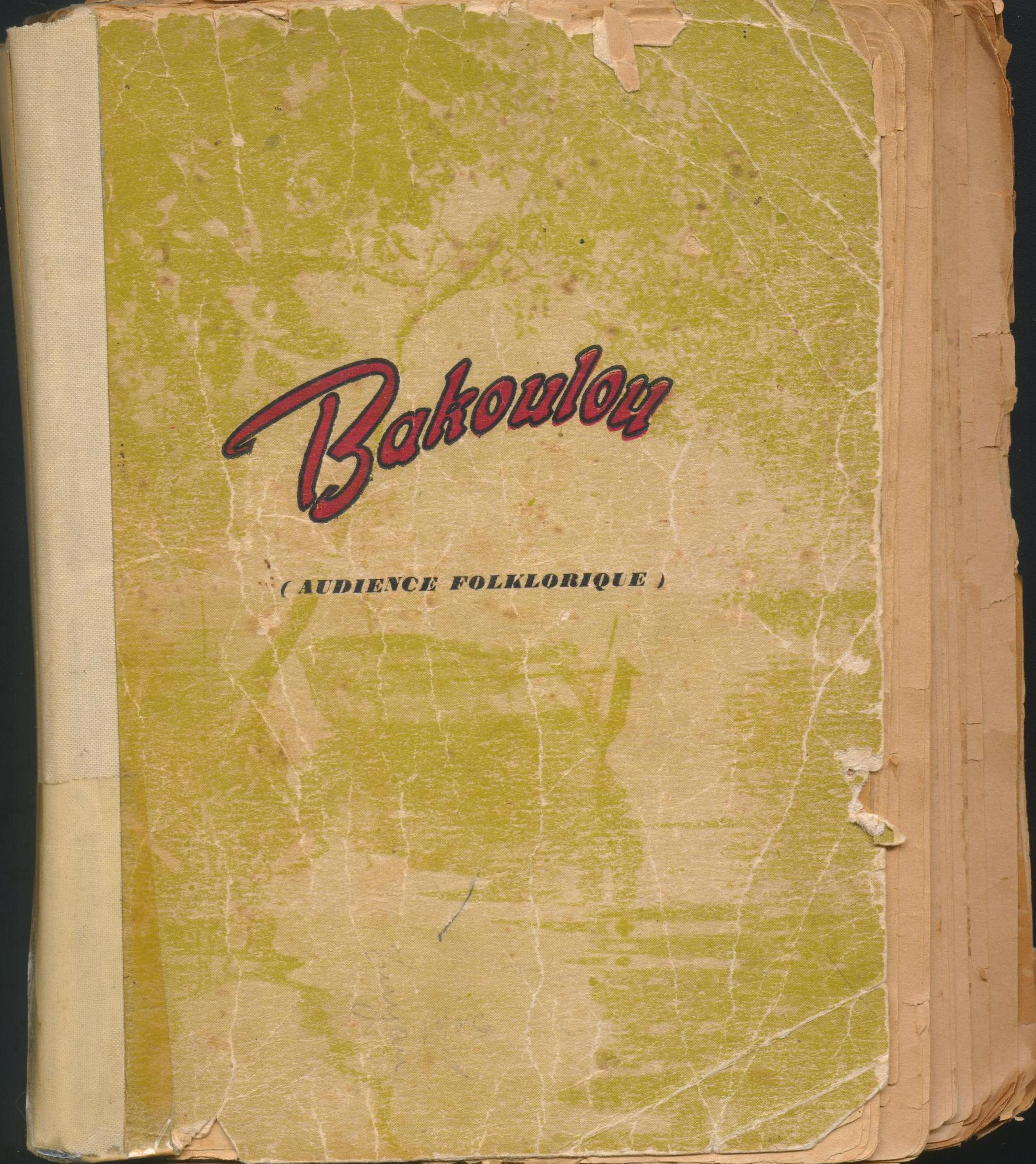
Front cover of the political satire book, "Bakoulou" [The Con Man], given to Philomé Obin and signed by his friend and fellow painter, Dewitt Peters

Dewitt Peter's signature on the inside cover of the "Bakoulou" [The Con Man] book, given to Philomé Obin

Obin sent Peters a small painting honouring U.S. President Franklin D. Roosevelt for ending the 1915–1934 American Occupation of Haiti. Peters sent Obin $5, the most he had ever received for a painting. Obin went on to paint at least three other paintings of Roosevelt, one showing him with Winston Churchill and Joseph Stalin, another of an angelic Roosevelt "interceding in heaven for the unity of the Americas". Selden Rodman, an associate of Peters, visited Obin at his residence in Cap-Haïtien. Obin proceeded to send many paintings to the Centre d'Art, and his work soon became sought after by art collectors and souvenir-hunting tourists. Obin also began teaching from an annexe of the Centre d'Art. The sale prices of his works rose steadily, and by the 1970s he was painting only on commission, receiving $1,000 to $3,000 for 20x24 inch paintings. His work at this time was being sold for up to $75,000.

In 1948, Obin, along with artists Rigaud Benoît, Wilson Bigaud, and Castera Bazile, were invited to provide frescoes for the interior of Sainte Trinité, the Episcopal Cathedral in Port-au-Prince. Obin contributed frescoes "The Crucifixion", which is the centerpiece of three murals that rise above the high altar, and "The Last Supper". Obin, however, much disliked Port-au-Prince, and rarely visited the Haitian capital after this work was finished.

=== Later career and death ===
In the early 1980s, Obin visited the capitals of Europe, with the United States as his last stop. Passing through New York, he visited some old acquaintances, and was honored at City College of New York, with a reception speech by Rosalind Jeffries of the Museum of Modern Art. He died in 1986.

Two decades after his death, works by Philomé Obin are housed at galleries in Port-au-Prince, Santo Domingo, and Sotheby's in New York.

=== Personal life ===
Obin was married twice. His first wife, Félicia Félix Obin, died young, leaving a young daughter who never knew her. His second marriage ended in divorce, having produced two children, Antoine and Gérard Obin. He had children by several other women.

== Artwork ==
=== Style ===
Obin's work can appear "flat" or simple, due to the use of simple colors and a flat 2-D shape to all the figures drawn. Coeval Magazine wrote that his "illusion of unsophisticated figurative drawings give way to a precision and detail almost unrecognizable to the naked eye".

Obin influenced many artists in the north of Haiti, who share his characteristic subtle coloring, including many artists he trained himself. Among painters of the "Cap-Haitian school", are Obin's brother Sénèque (1896–1972), and several of his children including Antoine Obin, Télémaque Obin, grandchildren such as Claude Obin, Michaëlle Obin, Henry-Claude Obin, Harisson Obin, Donald Obin, and nephews and nieces are also accomplished painters.

=== Vision de L'Artiste Philomé Obin ===
Among the works of Obin's first four decades that have survived is Vision de l'Artiste Philomé Obin pendant la nuit du 15 au 16 Janvier 1948, which he never sold and kept in his living room until his death. It depicts a beautiful mulatta seated on a boulder in a mostly barren landscape. The painting has been interpreted as representing "Maîtresse Zulie", a voodoo goddess, but Obin said in 1983 that it was a scene from a vivid dream that he had. Like most of his paintings, it bears both his boxed signature and its title, in neat letters centered toward the bottom of the work.

=== Trois Générations ===
Sometimes described as a "sophisticated naif", Obin work has an imperfect sense of perspective, but uses strong allegory. For example, one of his paintings, Trois générations shows three individuals with different types of vestments, who each represent their own period. The last person in the painting is casually attired, representing the American influence in Haiti. The inscription at the center bottom of the painting reads: Avant l’occupation, durant l’occupation, après l’occupation ("Before, During, and After the American Occupation"). Obin repeats this inscription on many of his works showing the various periods of American influence on Haiti and its population.

=== The Crucifixion of Charlemagne Peralte for Freedom ===
In 1919, Obin had lived through the crucifixion of Charlemagne Péralte, a Haitian patriot who opposed the American Occupation. Betrayed by a friend named Conzé, Péralte died in an ambush set by the U.S. Marines. His body was brought to Cap-Haïtien and strapped to a door, where it was displayed for several days to discourage further resistance. Though Obin had not witnessed the crucifixion, he considered Péralte as a hero, and painted several renditions of Péralte's death and funeral as statements of nationalist pride. He painted at least two versions of the "crucifixion", and his granddaughter, Michaëlle, has painted an allegorical scene showing Obin mourning in front of Péralte's corpse.
