= Sàngódáre Gbádégesin Àjàlá =

Nigerian textile artist

Sàngódáre Gbádégesin Àjàlá (1948–2021) was a Nigerian artist who specialized on hand-painted textiles. His work was shown at the central exhibition of the 60th Venice Biennale in 2024.

Àjàlá was an ethnic Yoruba. He did not receive any formal education and was self-taught. For a long time, he lived in the house of Susanne Wenger and considered her his adopted mother. Àjàlá's main profession was a priest of the god of Shango. As such, Àjàlá had extensive knowledge of traditional Yoruba dyes, and he used it in his batiks, sometimes employing up to 35 colors.

In 2014, a 25 feet (7.6 m) long batik Oro Sise:The Initiation by Àjàlá was bought and exhibited by the Saïd Business School at University of Oxford.
