= Sénèque Obin =

Haitian artist

- Born: 1893; Limbé, Haiti
- Died: 1977 (aged 83–84)
- Other name: Seneque Obin
- Occupation: painter
- Relatives: Philomé Obin (brother)

Sénèque Obin (1893–1977) was born in Limbé, Haiti. He was a Haitian-based artist that produced both still life paintings as well as historical scenes. He is considered one of many masters of the Haitian Renaissance. Obin's brother Philomé was also among these innovators during the Haitian artistic Renaissance starting in the 1940s.

== Background ==
Obin did not receive a formal art training and additionally started art later in life, at the age of 53. He had brothers who had careers as artists, which helped to influence Obin's style, as well as his general artistic knowledge. Sometimes political, Obin displayed historical scenes in Haiti, and most notably his painting titled "Friendship". He explored discourses surrounding international relations between Haiti and large world powers such as the United States.

== Organizations ==
Obin joined the Centre d'Art in 1948". Centre d'Art established a public initiative for Haitian art. Obin and his family were crucial to the success of the Cap-Hatien School of Art. The organization "...promoted intuitive artists and introduced their paintings and sculptures to the marketplace."

Sénèque and his brother were members of the Masonic brotherhood which reflected in their works. The brothers incorporated many masonic symbols into their pictorial space as a result of their loyalty to the brotherhood.
