= Adriano Pedrosa =

Brazilian curator

- Occupation: Curator

Adriano Pedrosa (born 1965) is a Brazilian curator. He is the artistic director of the São Paulo Museum of Art (MASP) and curated the 2024 Venice Biennale.

== Career ==
From 2011 to 2014, Pedrosa was responsible for the artistic programs at SP-Arte, an art fair in São Paulo, under the leadership of its founder Fernanda Feitosa.

Pedrosa was co-organizer of the 2006 edition of the Bienal de São Paulo, as well as biennial exhibitions in Tijuana (2005); San Juan, Puerto Rico (2009); and Istanbul (2011, with Jens Hoffmann). In 2013, he curated Hiwar, Conversations in Amman, a residency and conversations programme at the Khalid Shoman Foundation in Jordan, encompassing artists from countries including Angola, Brazil, Egypt, South Africa, Palestine and the Philippines.

Among Pedrosa's most well-known curated shows at MASP is Histórias, a series of shows at MASP each examining in depth a different theme, often a community or identity. These shows have included Histórias da Sexualidade (2017), focused on histories of sexuality; Histórias Afro-Atlânticas (2018), focused on the African diaspora and legacy of the Transatlantic slave trade; and Histórias Brasileiras (2022), focused on histories of Brazil.

Before joining MASP, Pedrosa served as curator responsible for exhibitions and the collection at the Pampulha Art Museum in Belo Horizonte from 2000 to 2003. During this period, he initiated Bolsa Pampulha, a competitive residency and exhibition program for artists that continues to be organized by the Museu de Arte da Pampulha (MAP) today.

The 2024 Venice Biennale curated by Pedrosa was titled Foreigners Everywhere, drawing its name from a series of works made by the Paris-born and Palermo-based collective Claire Fontaine. During the Biennale, Pedrosa met with Pope Francis on his visit to the Holy See pavilion on April 28, 2024, the first time a pontiff has attended the international exhibition.

In September 2025, the Museu de Arte de São Paulo began exhibiting Historiás da Ecologia, curated by Pedrosa. Historiás da Ecologia features the work of 117 artists and is on display until February 2026.

== Recognition ==
In 2022 Pedrosa was awarded the Audrey Irmas Award for Curatorial Excellence in 2023. Pedrosa was listed at number 14 on ArtReview's "Power 100 List."
