= EPFL (disambiguation) =

EPFL is the official name of École polytechnique fédérale de Lausanne, a public research university in Switzerland.

EPFL may also refer to:

- Rolex Learning Center, also known as the EPFL Learning Center, a campus and library in Switzerland
- Presses polytechniques et universitaires romandes, a Swiss publishing house, the English imprint is known as EPFL Press
- Eastern Pennsylvania Football League, an American football league that existed in 1938
- European Leagues, an Association football organization previously known as the European Professional Football Leagues (EPFL)
