= Naoshima Port Terminal =

Port terminal in Naoshima, Japan

- 直島港ターミナル
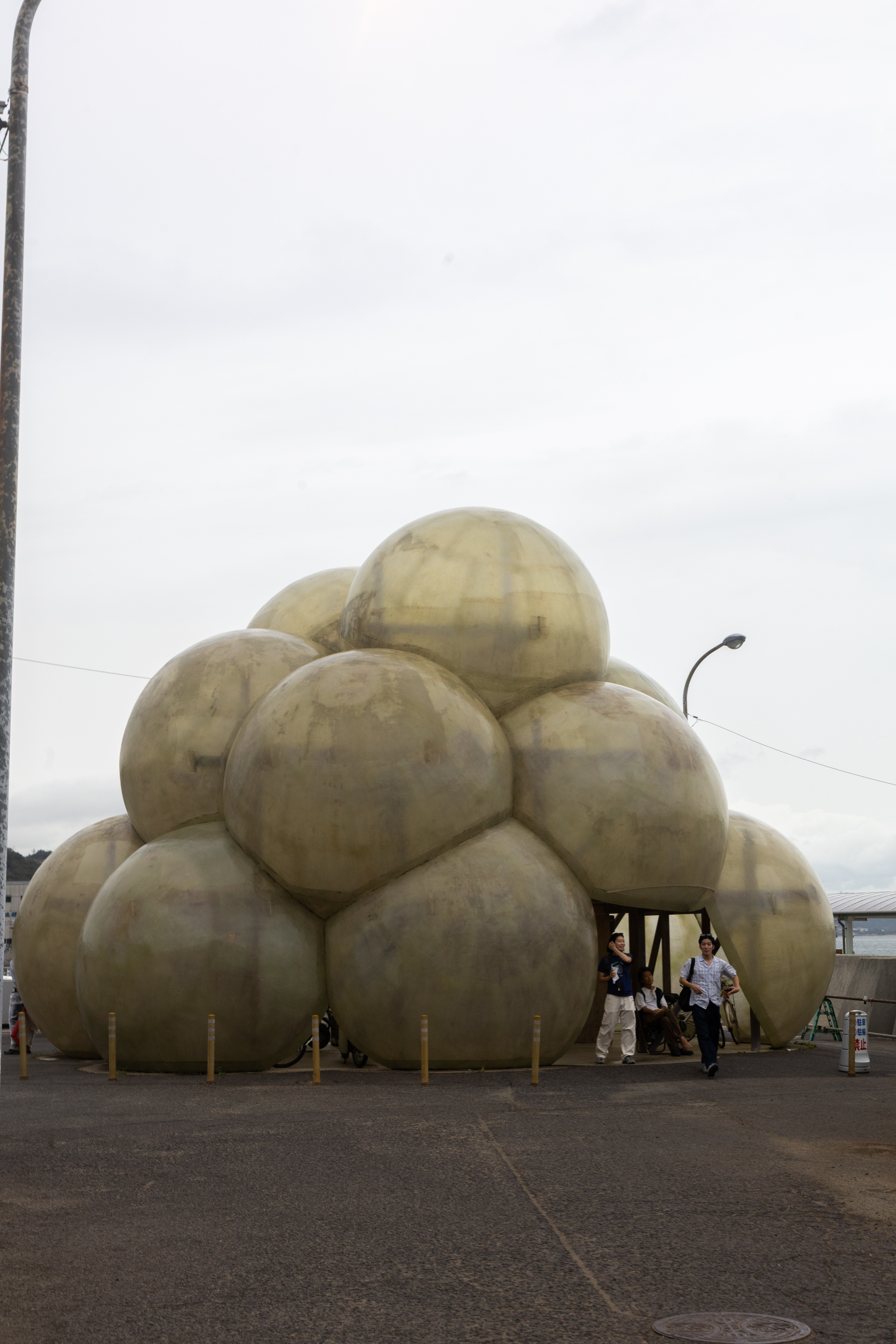
- The terminal in 2025
- Interactive map of the Naoshima Port Terminal area

General information
- Location: 宮ノ浦843 〒761-3110, Naoshima, Kagawa, Japan
- Coordinates: 34.4616004871615°N 133.9981432428948°E
- Opened: 2016

Design and construction
- Architect: SANAA

The Naoshima Port Terminal (直島港ターミナル) is a terminal designed by Tokyo-based architecture firm SANAA on the coast of the Honmura Area of Naoshima, an island of Japan. The building is created from wooden beams holding up thirteen stacked white bubbles made out of fiber-reinforced polymer. Each bubble is four meters in diameter, and the terminal stands eight meters high.

== History ==
SANAA, consisting of Japanese architects Kazuyo Sejima and Ryue Nishizawa, previously designed a ferry terminal building for Naoshima which was unveiled in 2006. The pair have also worked on numerous other architectural projects on the island, including the Art House Project.

A decade later, in 2016, SANAA completed another terminal building, in Honmura, for the purpose of providing tourists with a waiting area, as well as restrooms and bicycle parking, as a replacement for an older, existing terminal in the area. SANAA intended it to be distinctive landmark, stating: "We wanted to create something like a landmark for islanders as well as for visitors who visit the island for the first time, so they can easily find the boarding point for the ship." At night, lights illuminate the building from within, shining through the translucence of the bubbles.
