= Alyson Shotz =

American sculptor

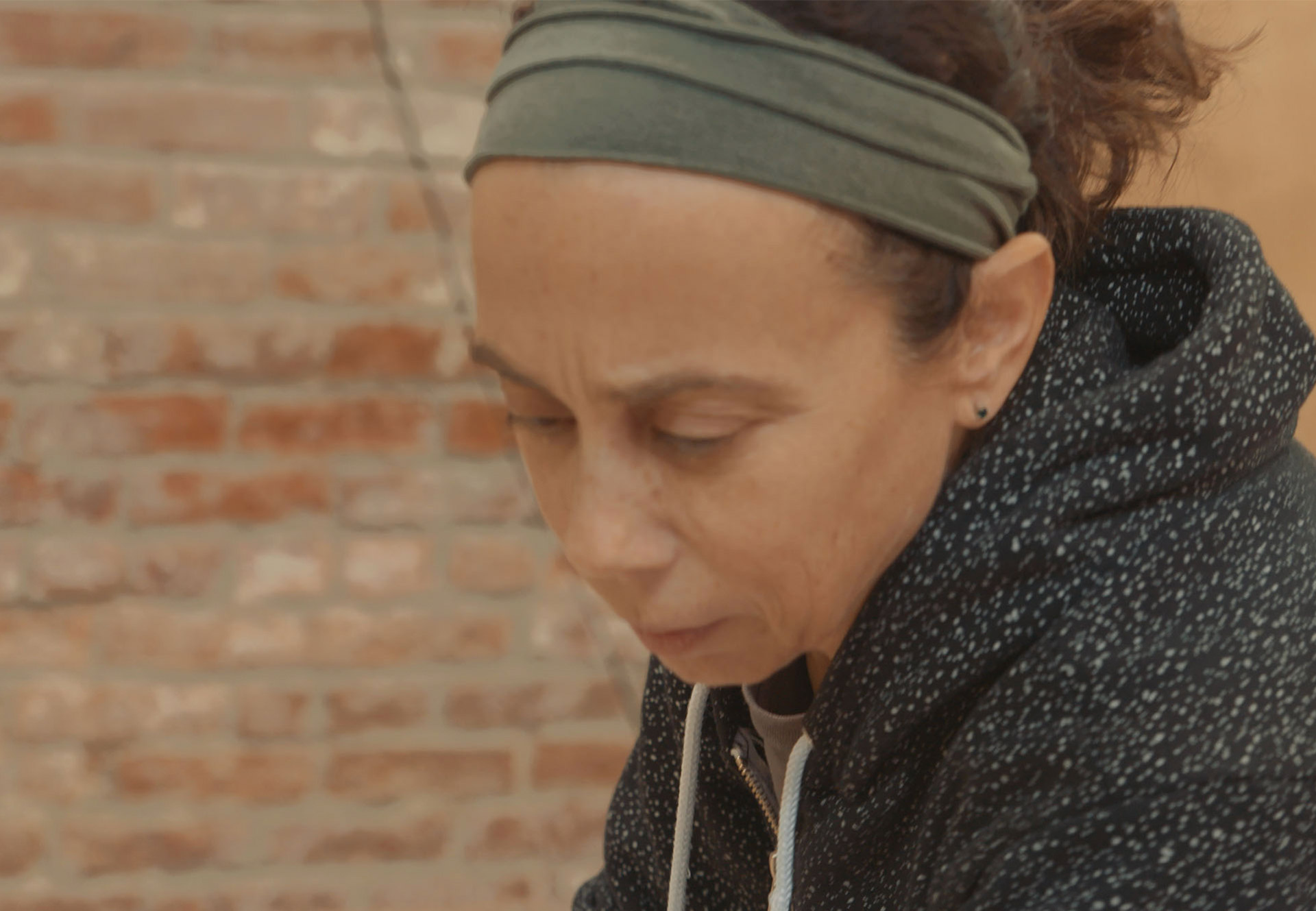
- Born: 1964 (age 61–62); Glendale, Arizona, United States
- Education: University of Washington, Rhode Island School of Design
- Known for: Sculpture, installation art, photography, video
- Awards: Stanford University Research Fellow, Pollock-Krasner Foundation, New York Foundation for the Arts
- Website: Alyson Shotz

Alyson Shotz (born 1964) is an American sculptor based in Brooklyn, New York. She is known for experiential, large-scale abstract sculptures and installations inspired by nature and scientific concepts, which manipulate light, shadow, space and gravity in order to investigate and complicate perception. Writers suggest her work challenges tenets of monumental, minimalist sculpture—traditionally welded, solid, heavy and static—through its accumulation of common materials in constructions that are often flexible, translucent, reflective, seemingly weightless, and responsive to changing conditions and basic forces. Sculpture critic Lilly Wei wrote, "In Shotz’s realizations, the definition of sculpture becomes increasingly expansive—each project, often in series, testing another proposition, another possibility, another permutation, while ignoring conventional boundaries."

Shotz’s artwork has been loosely grouped into three types: expansive, intricate large sculptures and installations that are handmade; minimal, self-contained sculptures that sometimes involve fabrication and elements of chance; and abstract photographs and digital prints based on photographs. Her work belongs to the collections of the Museum of Modern Art, Whitney Museum, Museum of Fine Arts, Houston, Guggenheim Museum Bilbao and Storm King Art Center, among others. She has exhibited at the Solomon R. Guggenheim Museum, Hirshhorn Museum, San Francisco Museum of Modern Art (SFMOMA), Guggenheim Bilbao, Wexner Center for the Arts and Indianapolis Museum of Art.

== Education and early and career ==
Shotz was born in Glendale, Arizona in 1964, the daughter of an Air Force pilot and a teacher. In childhood, she lived throughout the West and Midwest due to her father's career. She initially studied geology, but turned to art; science has remained a strong influence on her work. After enrolling at Rhode Island School of Design, she graduated with a BFA in 1987 and earned an MFA from the University of Washington in 1991. In the early 1990s, she moved to New York City.

Shotz began as a painter, producing colorful images of organic forms, while sometimes integrating photography, collage and video into her practice. A foundational work was Reflective Mimicry (1996), which included photographs and a video of a woman walking in the woods, clad in a full-body suit armored in small mirrors; its play of reflected foliage against actual foliage had the effect of de-materializing the figure. She would continue to explore the blurring of figure and ground, most similarly, in large-scale outdoor installations such as Mirror Fence (2003) and Scattering Screen (2016).

== Work and reception ==
Shotz's sculptures and installations manipulate ordinary synthetic materials—optical lenses, mirrors, glass, piano strings, wire, beads, nails—in concert with physical forces in order to investigate the shaping of perception, experiential boundaries, and ephemeral phenomena. She combines craftsmanship and process-intensive methods of accumulation and structure-building, often based in underlying concepts from physics, optics and mathematics. Her work produces perceptual conundrums—visual flux, spatial distortion, kaleidoscopic effects, and illusions of movement that result from shifts in light and vantage point. They evoke both natural sensations and scientific models, while blurring the ability to distinguish human-made from organic materials.

Alyson Shotz, Object for Reflection, punched aluminum and stainless steel rings, 122.5" x 145" x 57", 2017. Guggenheim Museum Bilbao collection.

Critics suggest that her work recalls minimalist constructions (e.g., Richard Serra), but stretches the boundaries of modernist sculpture, subverting ostensibly masculine tenets such as solidity, weight and fixity with qualities of fluidity, weightlessness, permeability and translucency; along these lines, one of Shotz's stated aims is to create volume without mass through her use of line, void, and carefully selected materials. The blend of minimal and organic forms in her art has been compared to that of Eva Hesse, however, she differs in her interest in the viewer as a participant; that emphasis has been related to the conceptual work of Lygia Clark, though Shotz's entails a more optical than physical participation.

=== Works and exhibitions, 1999–2009 ===
In the late 1990s, Shotz began receiving critical attention for work The New Yorker deemed "a cyberorganic spin on landscape," in exhibitions at the Aldrich Museum of Contemporary Art, MoMA PS1 and MASS MoCA. The New Art Examiner described her solo exhibition at Susan Inglett (1999) as displaying a "fascination with nature that's part childlike wonder, part humorous romp, and part clinical investigation." It included a digital photo of collaged budding flowers suggesting genetic engineering, a video, and Pink Swarm, one of two shimmering, suspended topiary- or cloud-like sculptures made of plastic, wire and clear surgical tubing. Covered with hundreds of tiny petals that dripped strings of goo, the sculptures evoked natural processes gone to excess.

For the Whitney Museum show "Pastoral Pop" (2000), Shotz installed Mobile Flora, a grove of 9-foot-tall, slender stalks made of Q-tips coated in green rubber with casters replacing roots, that reviews characterized as "weird, plant-machine hybrids," "alien bamboo," and "genetically mutated lily pads and beanstalks." In 2003, she created "Mirror Fence" at the Socrates Sculpture Park, a shimmering, three-by-130-foot-long picket fence faced in mirrors, whose slats disappeared and reappeared amid the surrounding landscape as viewers approached.

In subsequent exhibitions, Shotz presented abstract sculptures characterized as updated postminimalism "with a dash of pop science." These works consisted of accumulations of common materials that hung like drawings in space, evoking natural phenomena, invisible dimensions, and theoretical concepts such as string theory and dark matter. The Shape of Space (2004) is representative of this period. It was an undulating, translucent curtain-like form whose thousands of hand-cut and stapled plastic lenses bent and refracted light, distorting and fragmenting space to create confounding kaleidoscopic optical effects. Its fluctuating appearance was likened to a shimmering waterfall, a wall of ice, frosted translucent glass bricks, and—in its Guggenheim Museum presentation (2007), by Roberta Smith—to a "giant wind chime … dividing and multiplying its surroundings [to] provide tiny, glimmering, beveled views of the museum's rings, Central Park, an apartment building, traffic."

In shows at Locks Gallery, SFMOMA (both 2008), Derek Eller and Warehouse Gallery (both 2009), Shotz exhibited related suspended and wall-based sculptures that resembled ghostly, floating chandeliers or iced-over molecular forms (Crystalline Structure, 2007); weightless, skeletal apparitions made of long, bowing strands of beaded piano wire (The Structure of Light, 2008; Equilibrium, 2009); and billowing webs created by looping thread around pins nailed to walls in complex, mathematically based networks of triangles ("Thread Drawings", 2008). During this period, she also produced collage-like digital prints sourced from photographs of her own work (e.g., the series "A Momentary Configuration of Matter"). Reviews described them as hybrid, hive-like organic structures resembling DNA strands from an artificial life form, Rorschach tests, butterflies, lace patterns and skulls.

Alyson Shotz, Wave Equation, stainless steel wire, silvered glass beads and aluminum, 120" x 144" x 117", 2010, installation at the Nasher Sculpture Center. Indianapolis Museum of Art collection.

=== Installations and exhibitions, 2010– ===
In later work, Shotz continued to explore perceptual concerns while pursuing a wider range of materials, forms and processes. "Standing Wave" (2010, Wexner Center for the Arts) consisted of thousands of thin, iridescent clear acrylic strips placed side by side and projecting from a 25-foot-long wall in curved arches and undulating waves; the shifting refractions and reflections suggested op-art constructions. Wave Equation (2010, Nasher Sculpture Center) and Invariant Interval (2013, University of Texas) were monumental, yet delicate constructions employing piano and steel wire filaments in skeletal ellipses or web-like forms; reviews described them as "gossamer" works moving between presence and absence, interior and exterior, and static mass and illusory motion. The installations Plane Weave (2016, Pennsylvania Academy of Fine Art) and Object for Reflection (2017/2020, Guggenheim Bilbao) were vertical, tapestry-like works made of thousands of octagonal pieces of perforated aluminum joined by steel rings, whose flexible, open construction dramatically slumped and folded while appearing both solid and transparent. Their shimmering responses to changing sunlight evoked patterns ranging from natural (the sun on rippling water) to human-made (fabric, chain mail) to digital (screen pixels).

In exhibitions at Carolina Nitsch (2014), the Wellin Museum (2015) and Derek Eller (2017, 2020), Shotz presented bodies of work relying on chance. "Topographic Iterations" were abstract photo-drawings with a mystifying trompe l'oeil effect resembling cracked-earth interplanetary surfaces. She created them created by crumpling Japanese Masa paper, photographing and printing it, then crumpling the print. The "Recumbent Folds" series (2012–4) consisted of white, soft-sculpture-like porcelain forms created by dropping slabs or cylinders of clay from various heights and leaving them to harden. For "Crushed Cubes" (2018), she crushed steel, copper or bronze cubes to form new, unpredictably organic objects that also reimagined conventional minimalist objects. The Imaginary Sculptures series (2014) eschewed materials altogether by simply visualizing possible sculptures with haiku-like imperatives inscribed on enameled wall plaques.

Alyson Shotz, Three Fold, welded aluminum frame, acrylic with dichroic lamination, 56' x 15' x 6', 2013. Permanent Installation, Stanford University Li Ka Shing Center for Learning and Knowledge.

In 2020, she exhibited the "Intricate Metamorphosis" works—intimate, corporeal ceiling-hung sculptures with iridescent, chain-mail-like surfaces made of small electroplated steel disks—and "Chronometer" series, which comprised rhythmic, wall-mounted abstractions like paintings composed of thousands of gleaming copper washers and nails, interrupted by snaking bands of recycled rubber bicycle inner tubes. New Yorker critic Johanna Fateman likened the former to "empty cocoons of some unknown species or, more fantastically, tails abandoned by mermaids," while suggesting the latter works embodied COVID-related themes of marking time and confronting mortality. In her 2023 exhibitions "Alloys of Moonlight" and "The Silent Constellations," Shotz explored space, energy, light and phenomenological experience through minimal, metallic mesh forms resembling Möbius strips and delicate rectangular and fan-like reliefs of hand-folded aluminum, respectively.

== Public commissions ==
Shotz has been commissioned to create large-scale, site-specific works for the Stanford University Li Ka Shing Center for Learning and Knowledge, NYU Langone Health, MTA Arts & Design (New York), High Museum of Art, Cleveland Clinic and AT&T Stadium (Dallas). In 2022, she installed the permanent, twisting painted-steel sculpture Entanglement above the atrium of the Skidmore College Center for Integrated Sciences. Her glass mosaic work for the domed ceiling of the Fred D. Thompson Federal Courthouse in Nashville, The Robes of Justitia, was commissioned by the U.S. General Services Administration (GSA) and won the organization's 2022 Honor Award in Art. In 2023, Shotz's outdoor, site-responsive sculpture, Temporal Shift, was acquired by the deCordova Sculpture Park and Museum; originally commissioned by the Grace Farms Foundation, the work's elliptical, stainless-steel form interacts with natural light and references the Earth’s orbital pathway around the Sun.

== Collections and recognition ==
Shotz's work belongs to the public collections of the Academy Art Museum, Baltimore Museum of Art, Brooklyn Museum of Art, deCordova Sculpture Park and Museum, Solomon R. Guggenheim Museum, Guggenheim Bilbao, Hirshhorn Museum and Sculpture Garden, Indianapolis Museum of Art, Los Angeles County Museum of Art, Madison Museum of Contemporary Art, Museum of Fine Arts, Houston, Museum of Modern Art, National Gallery of Art, Pennsylvania Academy of the Fine Arts, The Phillips Collection, Rose Art Museum, San Francisco Museum of Modern Art, San Jose Museum of Art, Storm King Art Center and Whitney Museum, among others.

She has been awarded fellowships from the Saint-Gaudens Memorial (2007), New York Foundation for the Arts (2004), MacDowell (2021) and Stanford University (2014), and received awards from Art Matters (1996), Yale University (2005), the U.S. GSA (Honor Award in Art, 2022), and the Pollock-Krasner (1999), Marie Walsh Sharpe (2004) and Peter S. Reed (2021) foundations, among others.
