= Koga Park Café =

Building in Ibaraki, Japan

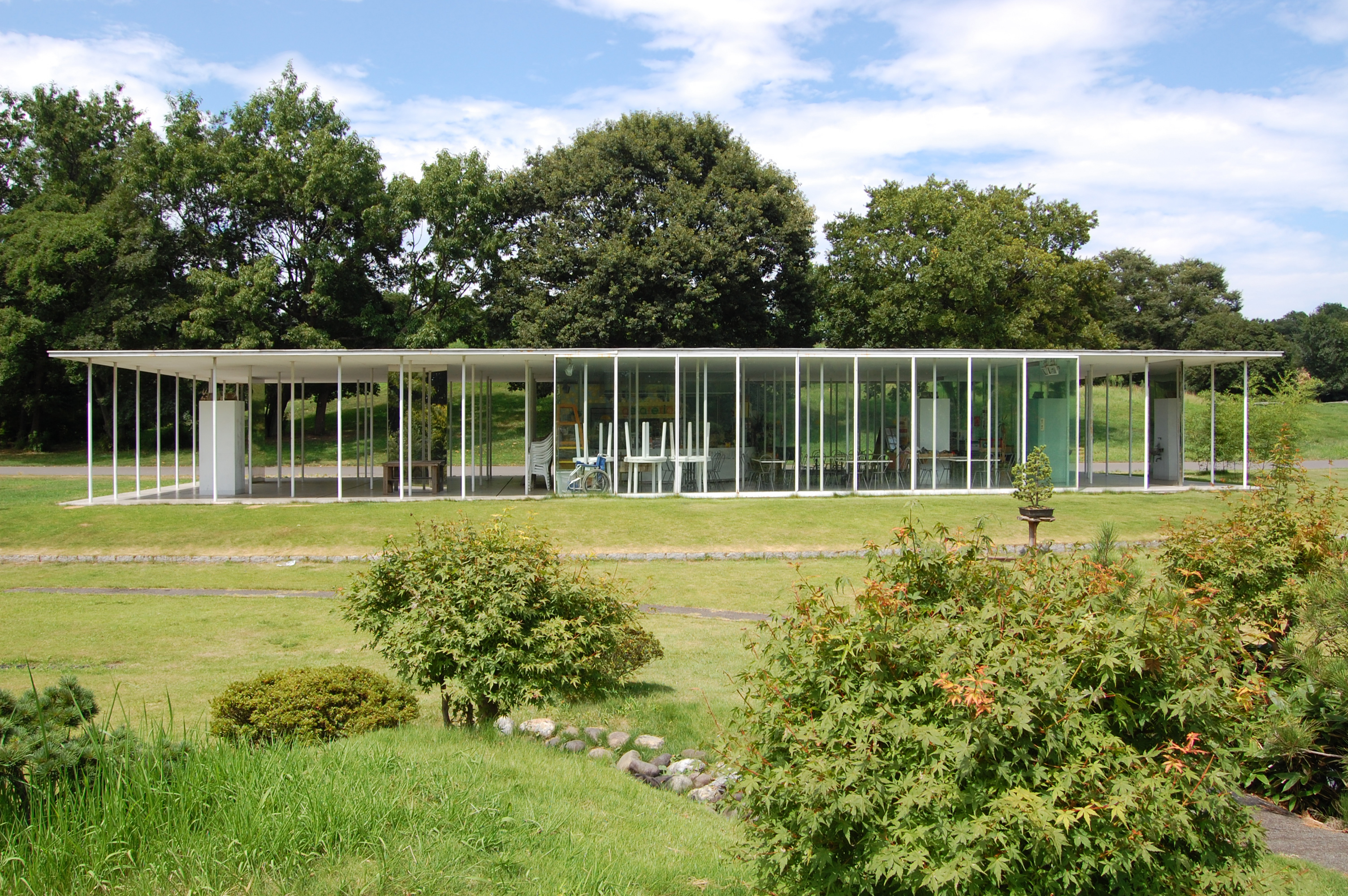
- Koga Park Café, Ibaraki, Japan
- Interactive map of the Koga Park Café area

General information
- Status: Completed
- Location: 399-1 Konosu, Koga, Ibaraki 306-0041, Japan
- Construction started: 1997
- Completed: 1998

Technical details
- Material: Stainless steel, Glass

Design and construction
- Architects: Kazuyo Sejima; Ryue Nishizawa
- Architecture firm: SANAA

Koga Park Café is a restaurant located in the Park of Koga in Ibaraki, sixty kilometers north of Tokyo, Japan. It was constructed between 1996 and 1998 by engineer Mutsuro Sasaki (b.1946), and designed by the Japanese architectural firm, SANAA, run by Kazuyo Sejima (b.1956) and Ryuei Nishizawa (b.1966).

During the construction of the café, one of the design constraints put forth by the municipal corporation was to ensure that half of the plot should be an exterior/semi-covered space, while the other half comprises both interior and exterior spaces. As a result, the café and the two terraces are separated by glazing and sliding doors that open to the park landscape, allowing the interior to merge with the exterior while still being connected to the terraces.

The building assumes a cuboidal form, resting against a gentle hill slope on the north and overlooking a lake on the south. The four facades are enclosed in transparent glass, offering a panoramic view of the park that stretches across 25 hectares in surface area. The building is characterized by reduced physical presence of the elements to preserve the natural environment as much as possible. To accomplish this, the structure has a rectangular footprint topped with a single roof of a 25 millimeter steel plate. This roof is supported by 100 tubular steel posts that are three metres tall and approximately 60 millimeters in diameter. They successfully take on vertical stress, and are placed randomly within the building but when around the periphery, they form a peristyle. The horizontal stress is managed by four 60 millimeter thick steel-plate shear panels that are installed at each end. The mirror-finish stainless steel together with reflectant furnishings create a "symbiotic effect with the landscape." This effect lends a neutral and immaterial appearance to the pavilion, emphasizing spatial ambiguity and transforming the building into "another element of the natural context, rather than a solid object placed on the landscape."

The café was completed during the early years of SANAA, acting as a prototype for the firm's "unified, horizontal, non-hierarchical" approach to architecture.
