= Ogasawara Museum =

Building in Nagano, Japan

Coordinates: 35°26′47″N 137°47′42″E

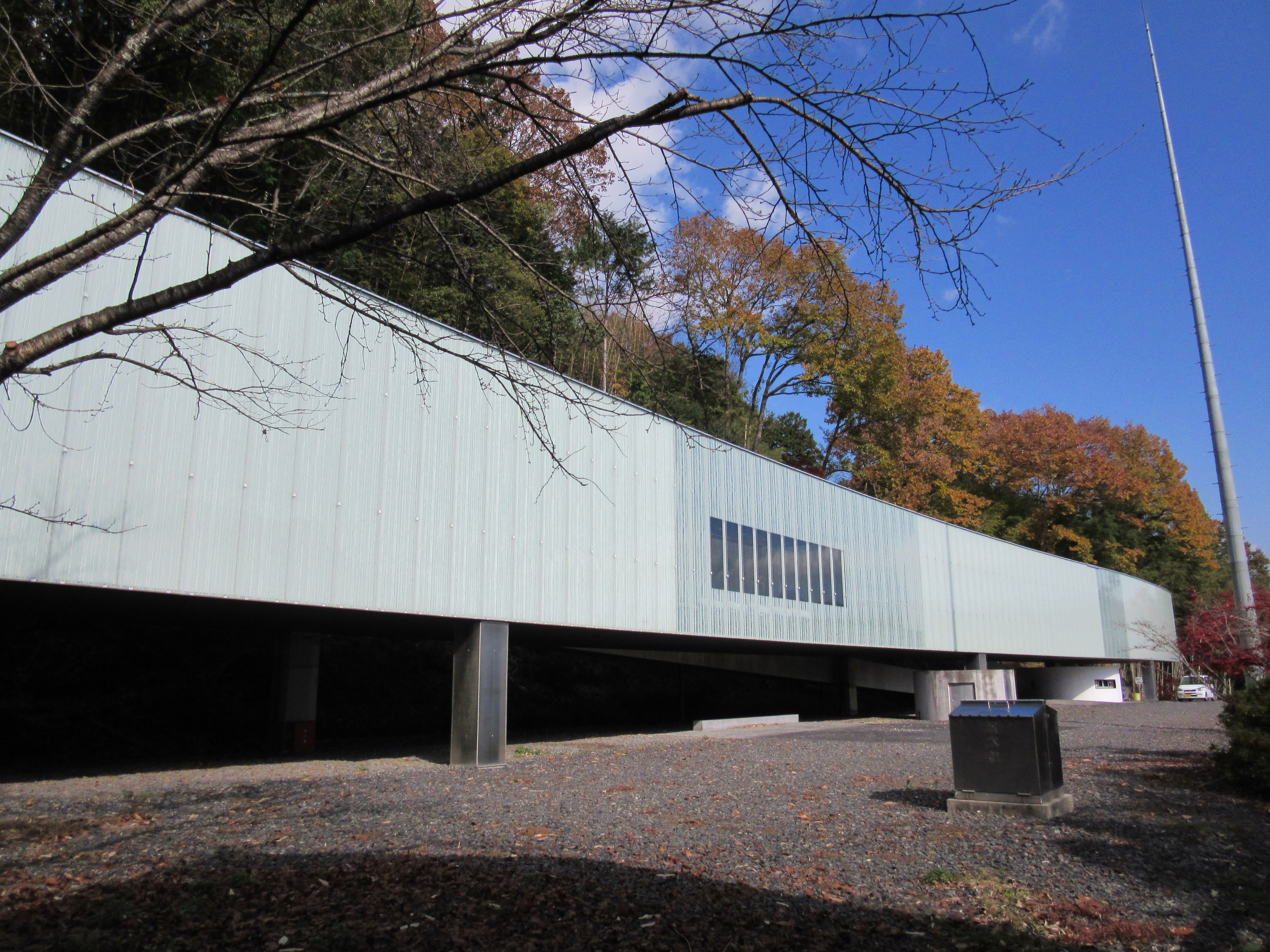
- Ogasawara Museum, Japan
- Interactive map of the Ogasawara Museum area

General information
- Status: Completed
- Location: Izuki, Iida, Nagano 399-2434, Japan
- Construction started: 1995
- Completed: 1999

Design and construction
- Architects: Kazuyo Sejima; Ryue Nishizawa
- Architecture firm: SANAA

The Ogasawara Museum (or the O-Museum) is a located in the Shiroyama mountain range of Nagano Prefecture in the center of the Honshu island, Japan. The building was designed by the architecture firm, SANAA, run by Kazuyo Sejima and Ryue Nishizawa, and constructed between 1995 and 1999. It was one of the architect-duo's first projects together.

The building is situated between the mountain and an old, publicly-accessible shoin or a writing room. The structure assumes a narrow and elongated form because, according to the municipal corporation, it should adhere to the minimum established distance from the shoin.

The one storey museum gently curves in alignment with the contours of the topography. The raised floor system, made possible by six square-section pilotis, helps preserve the environment and protect the exhibition space from humidity. The main lobby, positioned between the temporary exhibitions and the permanent college, can be reached through a ramp that emerges from the open public plaza right below the building. The wraparound, silkscreen-printed curtain wall, with the exception of a cut-out in the lobby area that offers a frontal view of the shoin, protects the exhibited objects from daylight.

The building interior features “large areas of shadows and shōji-like lighting effects” wherein the light enters the floor through the painted lines on glass windows to create an “ambiguous light surface.” This architectural style that uses “pale light surfaces upon large shadows” has become more commonplace in modern Japan. The two exhibition halls, along the linear itinerary, merge into a breakout space towards the end; here, the translucent facade offers a panoramic view of the landscape and a historical villa neighbouring the remains of a Muromachi period castle at the foot of the mountain. The surroundings link the museum to the “physical context to which they belong.”

The exhibits showcase the unique flora and fauna of the Ogasawara islands (also known as the Bonin islands; 小笠原諸島), and provide visitors with more information about the geological formation of this remote archipelago, as well as the traditional lifestyle and customs of the islanders.

== Awards and recognition ==
Sejima and Nishizawa were honoured with the 2010 Pritzker Architecture Prize for their "consistent and significant contributions to humanity and the built environment through the art of architecture." The jury citation specifically referred to four of the architecture-duo's works: New Museum (New York City, US), Toledo Museum of Art (Ohio, US), 21st Century Muscum of Contemporary Art (Kanazawa, Japan), and Ogasawara Museum (Nagado, Japan).
