= PPUR =

PPUR may refer to:

- Presses polytechniques et universitaires romandes, university press of French-speaking Switzerland
- Puerto Princesa Underground River, see Puerto Princesa Subterranean River National Park
- People's Patriotic Union of Russia (NPSR)
