= Taichung Main Public Library =

Public library in Xitun, Taichung, Taiwan

- 臺中市立圖書館
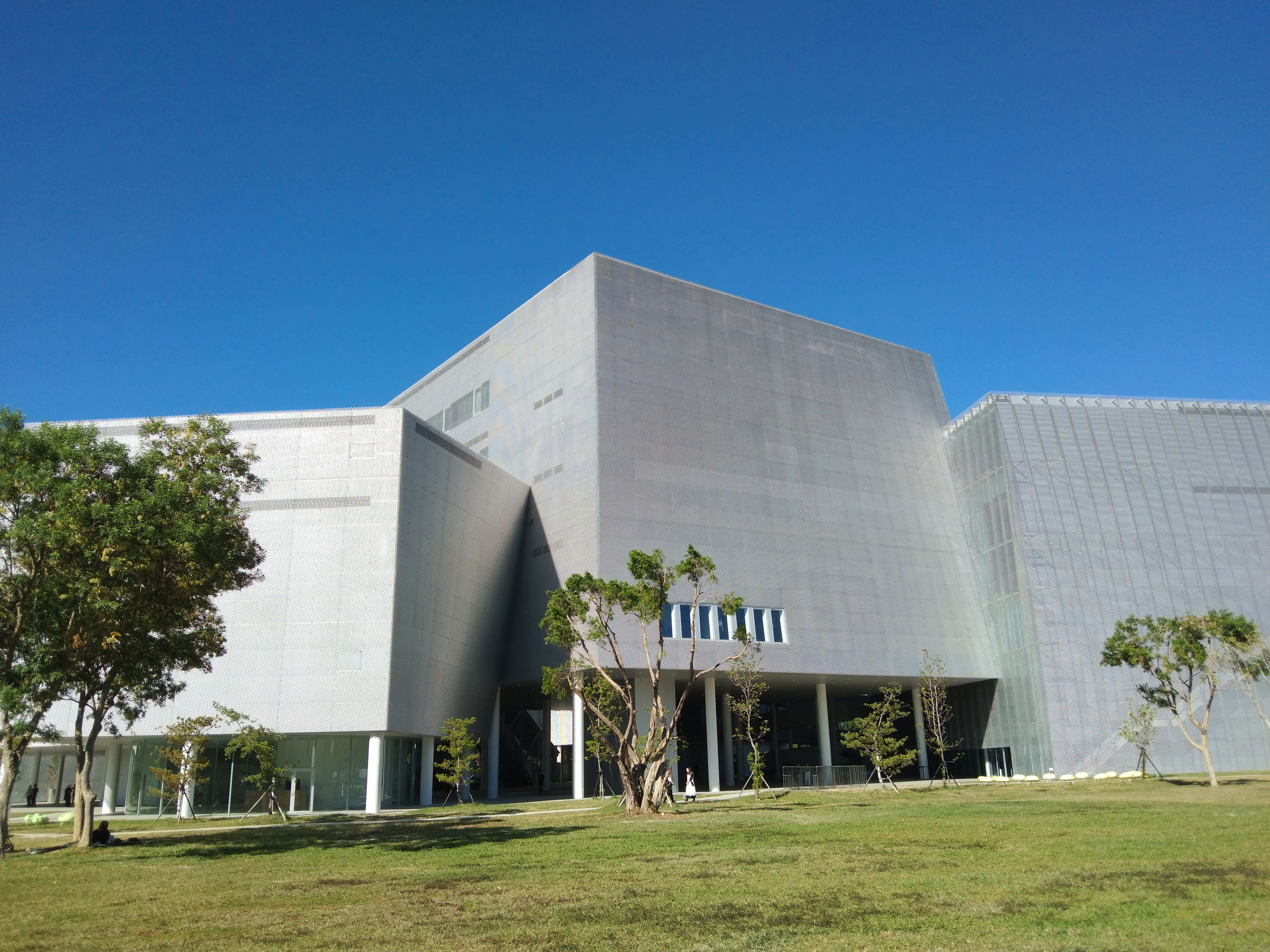
- Taichung Main Public Library (Taichung Green Museumbrary)
- 24.193039°N 120.654567°E
- Location: Taichung, Taiwan
- Established: 2025 (current main library)
- Branches: 43

Other information
- Director: Hui-Chun Tseng
- Website: www.library.taichung.gov.tw

The Taichung Main Public Library (Chinese: 臺中市立圖書館; pinyin: Táizhōng Shìlì Túshūguǎn) is the central library of Taichung, Taiwan. It is the main library of the Taichung Public Library System, located in the Taichung Shuinan Economic and Trade Park, Xitun District. The new building began trial operation on October 28, 2025.

== Architecture ==
=== Former building (Szu-Chang-Li Branch) ===
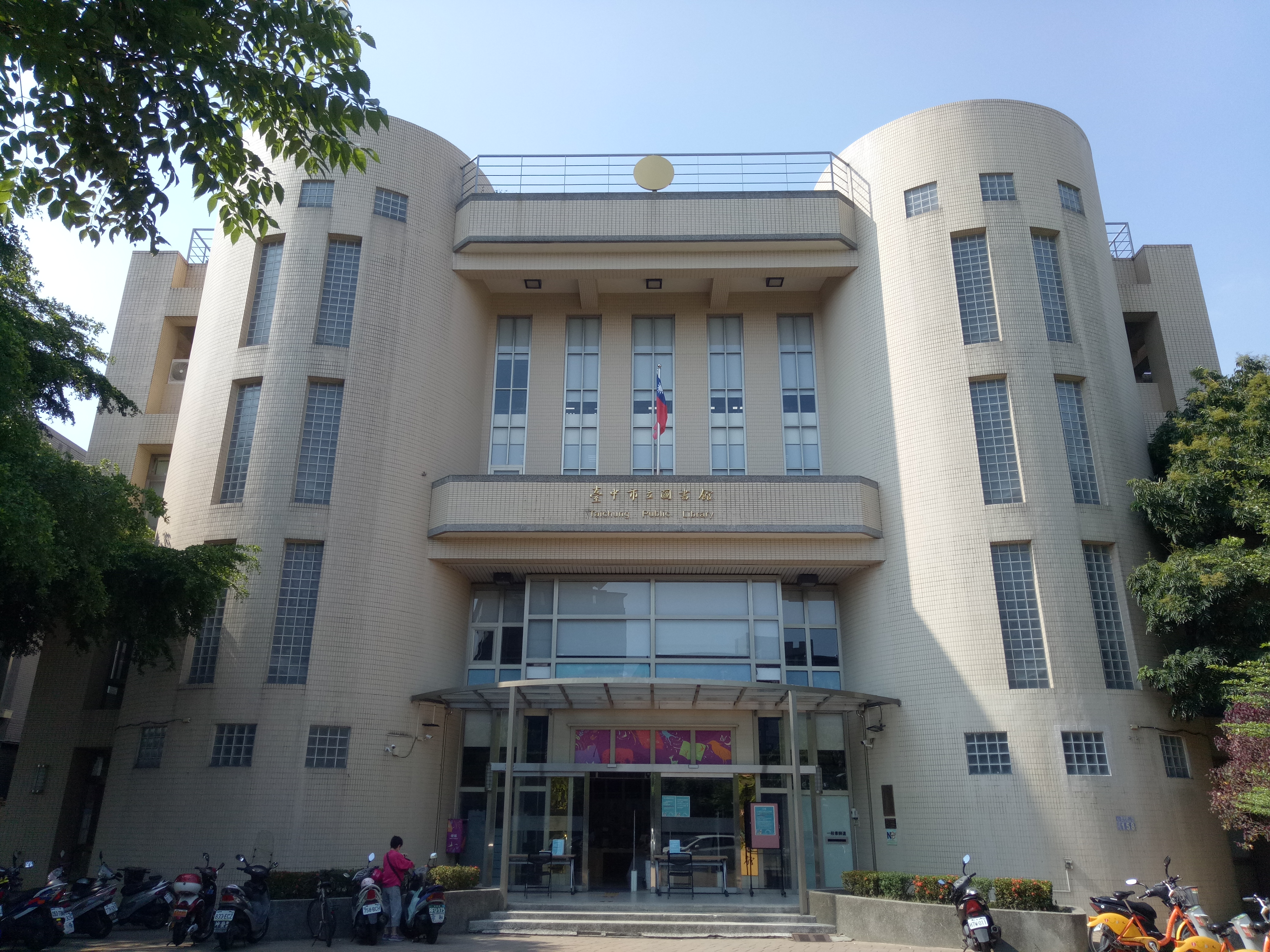
Szu-Chang-Li Branch, served as main library from 2016 to 2025.

The former main library building was opened in 2003 as Taichung Public Library Szu-Chang-Li Branch (Chinese: 臺中市立圖書館北屯四張犁分館), it comprises 4 above-ground floors and one below. It was promoted to Taichung Main Public Library in March 2016.

=== New building ===
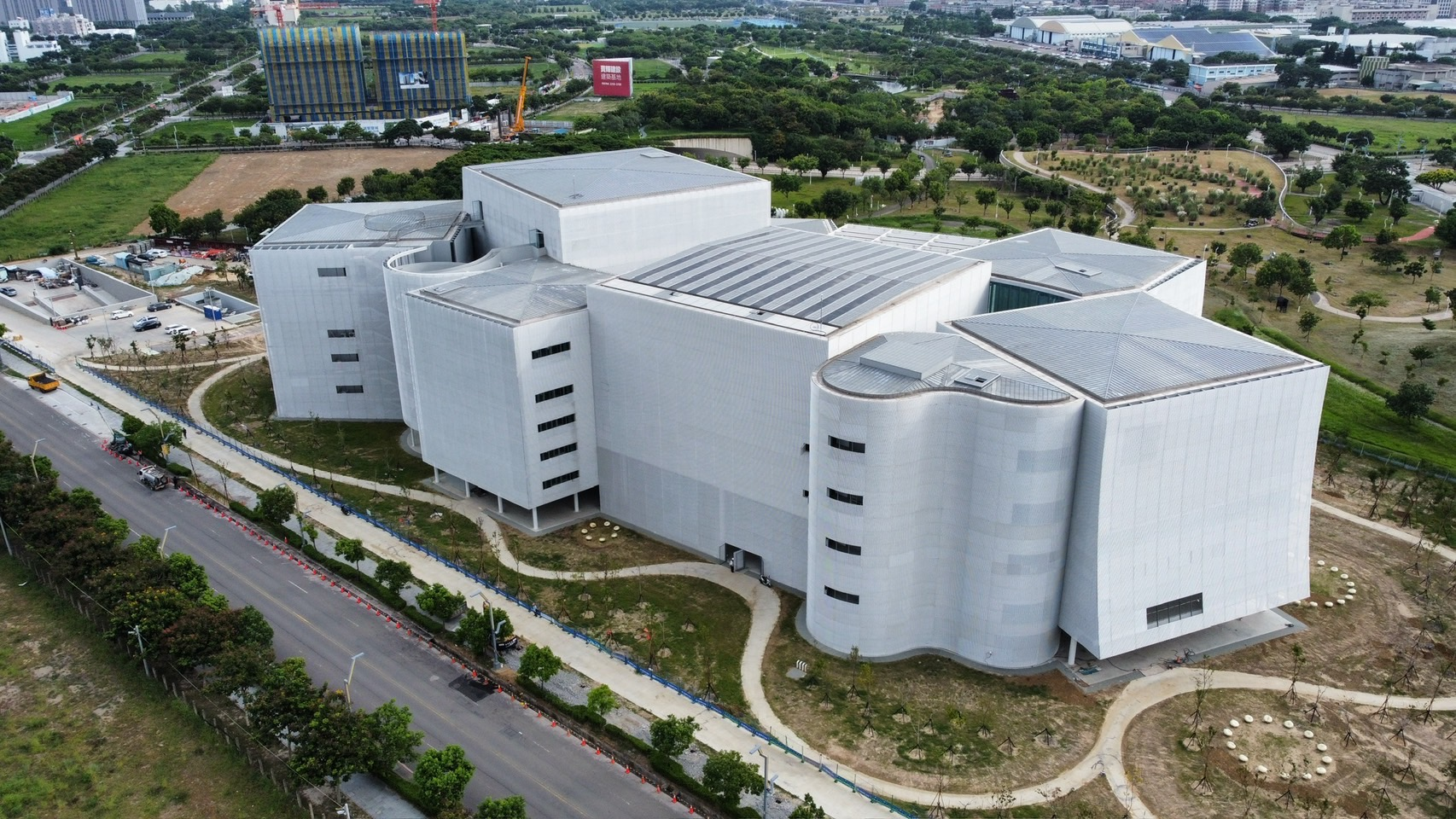
Taichung Green Museumbrary under construction (August 2024)

The new building is called Taichung Green Museumbrary (Chinese: 臺中綠美圖). As its name suggests, it is a complex serving the purposes of both an art museum and library. It was designed by Japanese architects Kazuyo Sejima and Ryue Nishizawa of firm SANAA. The construction is a seismic isolation building with steel-frame structure, containing 2 floors underground and 7 floors above ground.

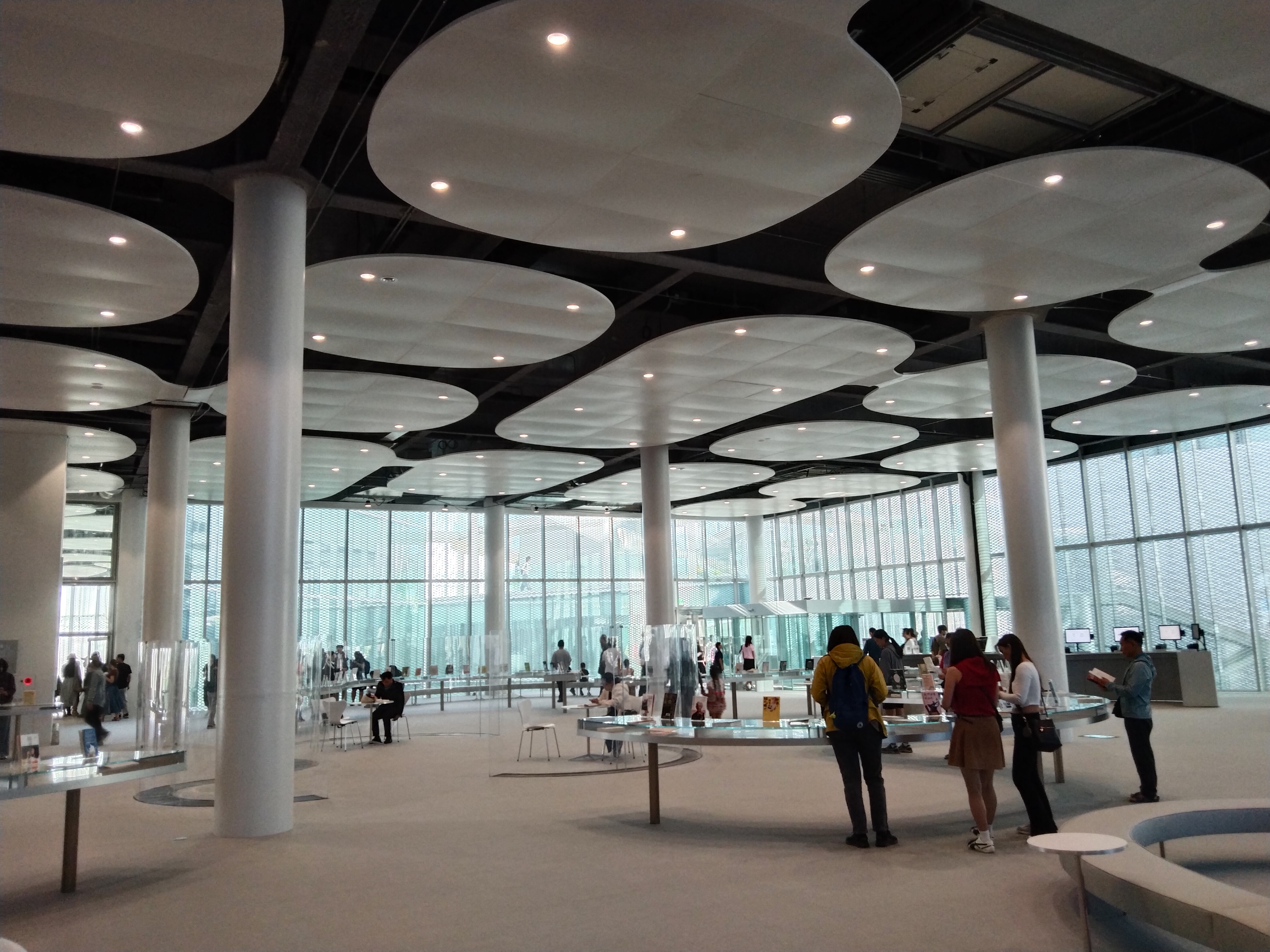
Library Lobby

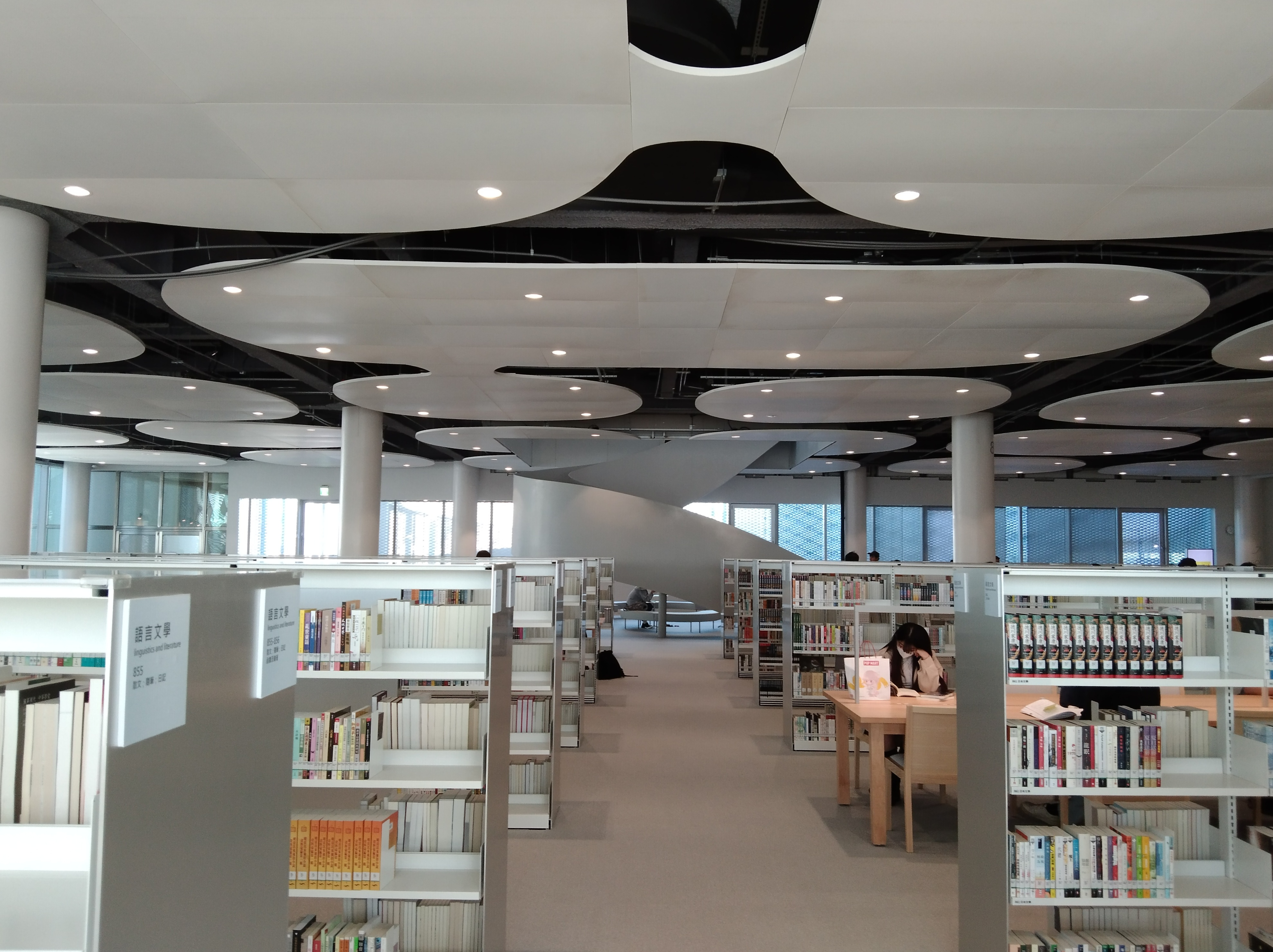
Books Collections Area

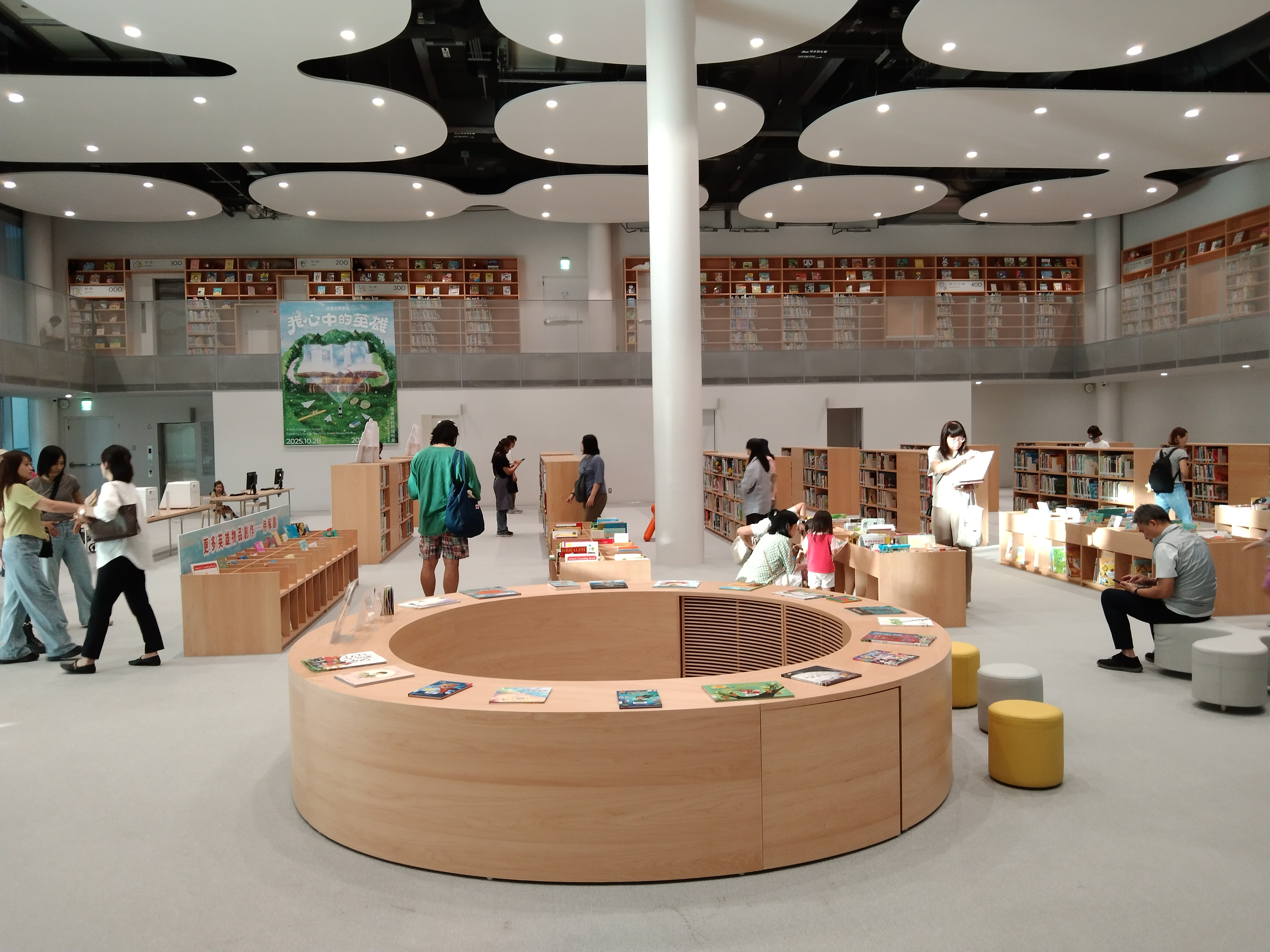
Children's Books Area
