= Grace Farms =

Public space in New Canaan, Connecticut

Coordinates: 41.196926°N 73.512058°W

Grace Farms is an 80-acre cultural and humanitarian center in New Canaan, Connecticut. The building is designed to follow a linear, curving form that references the movement of a river. Its layout integrates with the surrounding landscape and maintains a relatively low visual profile.

== Grace Farms Foundation ==
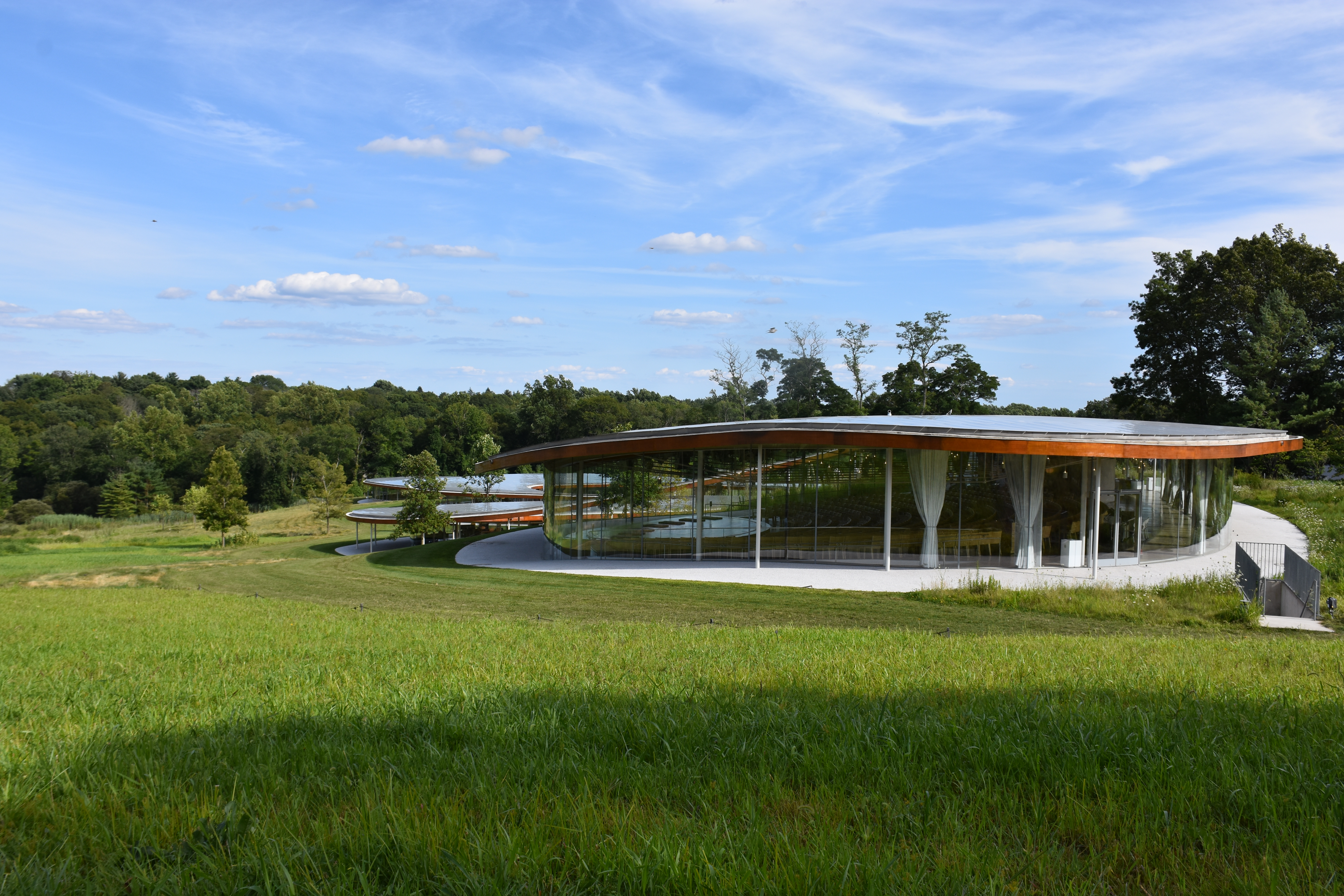
The River building at Grace Farms sits amongst meadows and woodlands in New Canaan, CT

Grace Farms is owned and operated by Grace Farms Foundation, a not-for-profit organization whose interdisciplinary humanitarian mission is to pursue peace through nature, arts, justice, community, faith, and Design for Freedom, a new movement to remove forced labor from the built environment. The Foundation carries out its work through Grace Farms, a SANAA-designed site for convening people across sectors. Its stake in the ground is to end modern slavery and gender-based violence, and create more grace and peace in local and global communities. Sharon Prince is the CEO and Founder of Grace Farms Foundation. Prince also launched the Design for Freedom movement with the publication of a nearly 100-page report that provides analysis and data on forced labor in building materials supply chains.

Grace Farms Foundation set out to create a building set into the existing habitat that would enable visitors to experience nature, resulting in The River building, designed by the Pritzker Prize-winning, Japanese architecture firm SANAA.

== Architecture ==
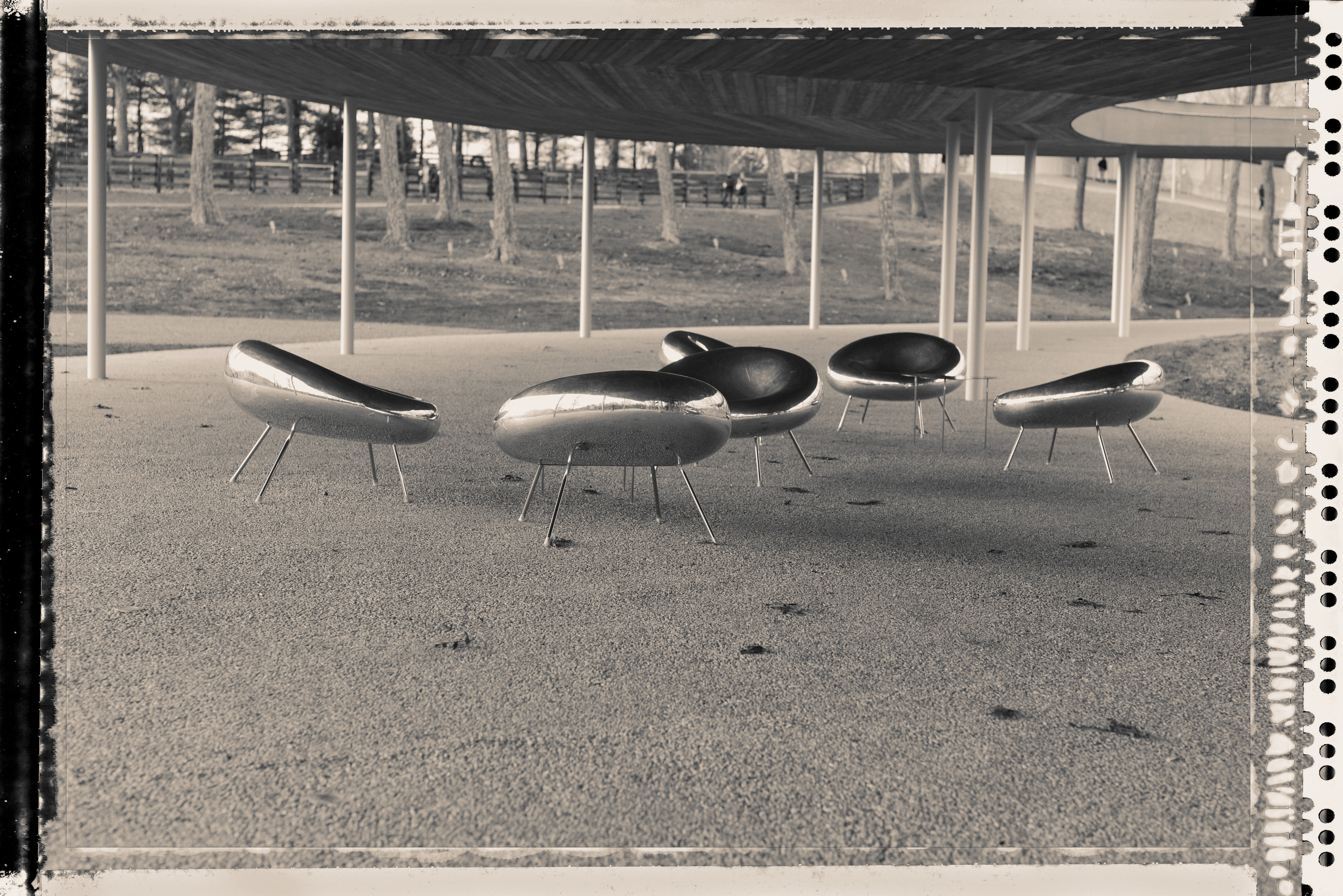
Chairs at Grace Farms, New Canaan, CT

Opened in 2015, the River building was designed by the Japanese architectural firm SANAA, led by Kazuyo Sejima and Ryue Nishizawa. The porous design of Grace Farms and the River building was meant to inspire and break down barriers between people and nature. The building has a long, gentle slope with an overall grade change of 43 ft - 9 in. The undulating pathways under a curvilinear roof follow the flow and elevation of the land, where a series of bends creates pond-like spaces. Natural light flows through more than 200 floor-to-ceiling glass panels in the River building, generating 360-degree views of the landscape. Structurally, a system of wood, concrete, steel, and glass forms a continuous roof that appears to float above the site as it moves through the landscape. Under the building's continuous roof are five transparent glass-enclosed volumes that can host a variety of activities and events.

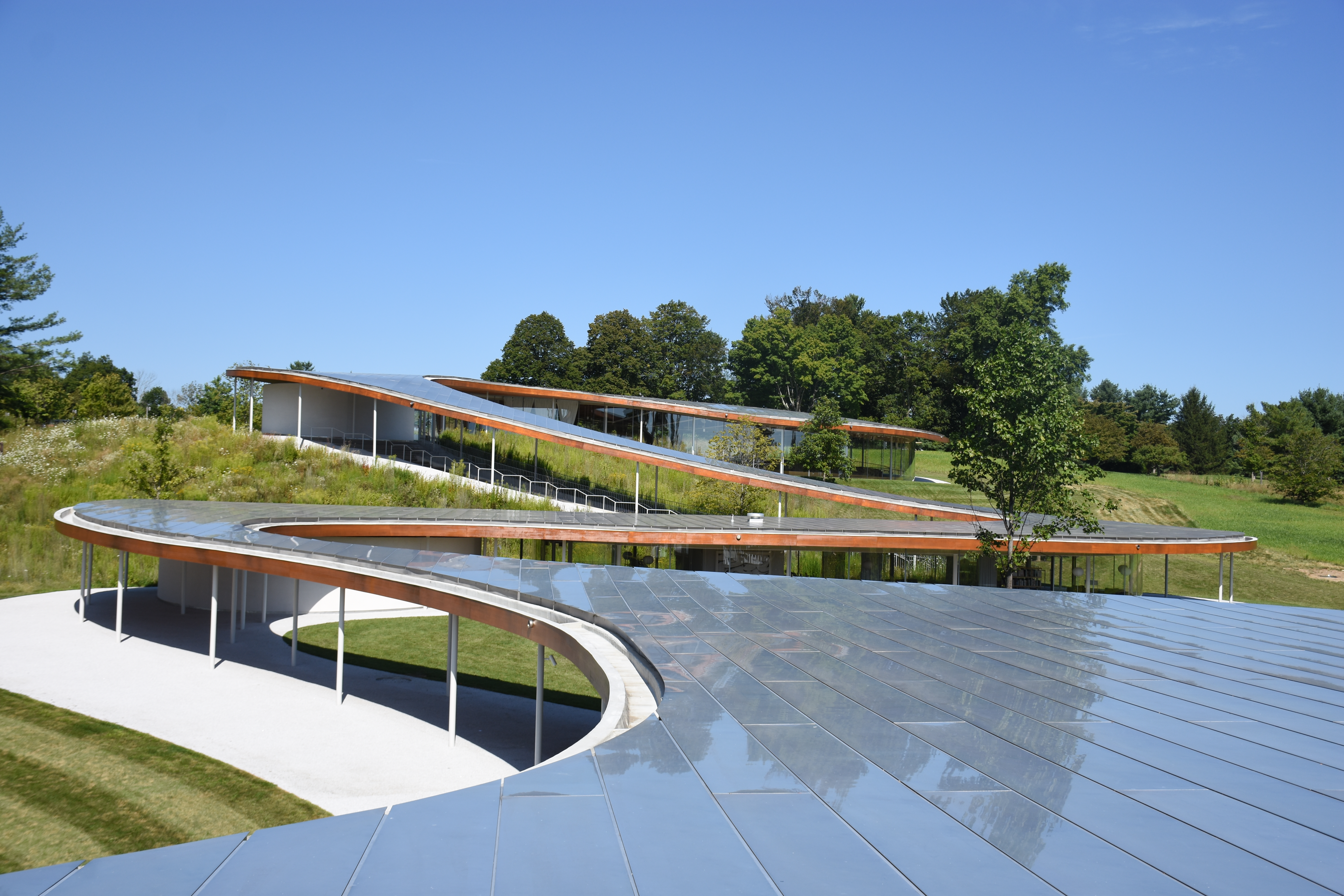
The roof of The River building is made of reflective anodized aluminum panels that reflect the sun

=== Facilities ===
The areas of the River building are: the Sanctuary, a 700-seat amphitheater; the library, a staffed library with resources related to Grace Farms Foundation's initiatives; the Commons, a community gathering space with 18-foot-long tables; the Pavilion; a welcome reception and conversation space with tea service; and the Court, a partially below-grade recreational and performance space.

Grace Farms consists of the 48-acre former Windsome Farm, an equestrian facility, and an adjacent 27-acre parcel, which were bought between 2008 and 2009 by the Grace Farms Foundation. An additional five acres were later purchased. The property still features the equestrian farm's paddocks, as well as two barns that are now used as a welcome center and offices.

Grace Farms is free and accessible to the public six days a week. It includes two exhibits, open arts studios, and a wide range of daily programming led by its visitor engagement team. Permanent contemporary art installations by Thomas Demand, Olafur Eliasson, Teresita Fernández, Beatriz Milhazes, and Susan Philipsz are located around Grace Farms.

=== Structure ===
==== Rainscreen Roof (Manufactured by Zahner) ====
The rainscreen roof is formed through standard-sized sheets of exterior anodized aluminum on a dual curvature panel system. This form is achieved by using a lightweight assembly of custom aluminum extrusions to create a channel between the aluminum outer layers. In this system, a floating aluminum plate acts as a visual transition between the panels.

==== Glue-Laminated Beams & Trusses (Manufactured by Structurlam) ====
Over 200 steel columns and sloping glu-laminated timber beams and trusses make up the hybrid structure that supports the curving roof. Cedar is used at the fascia, while the underside is finished with 3-inch-wide Douglas fir boards. Planks joints are aligned to match the turns and angle of the roof.

==== Concrete, Foundations & Slabs (Manufactured by Villa Construction) ====
Under the flowing roof, concrete slabs and foundations are integrated with the thin structural members to create open spaces for activity inside.

==== Steel Superstructure (Manufactured by QSR Steel) ====
The hybrid system pairs timber beams with steel columns and a steel superstructure that spans approximately 1,400 feet. The steel structure is arranged around glazed spaces and extends above a stepped outdoor path that runs along the landscape and mirrors the shape of the roof.

==== Glass Curtain Wall (Manufactured by Roschmann Steel & Glass) ====
Double paned window walls were used to maintain visual connection with the surrounding landscape. The low iron class combines silicon joints, curved panes, and stainless steel sash. The seven to eight feet wide trapezoidal panes create a continuous building facade system.

=== Landscape and Sustainability ===
Around 77 out of the 80 acres are open meadows, wetlands, forests, and ponds. Landscape design by OLIN expands existing habitats for native plants and animals with the addition of a community garden, athletic field, and trails and playgrounds designed by SANAA. Trees that were removed during the construction phase are processed on-site and used to construct furniture for Grace Farms, including 18-foot-long community tables. 55 geothermal wells, each 500 feet deep, were installed for heating and cooling purposes. 70% of mowed land will be restored to natural meadows under the landscape planning of Larry Weaner Landscape Associates.

== Awards ==
- Mies Crown Hall Americas Prize (MCHAP) 2014-2015, Grace Farms
- AIA National 2017 Architecture Honor Award, Grace Farms
- Fast Company, 2016 Innovation by Design Awards, Social Good Finalist, Grace Farms
- The Architect's Newspaper Best of Design Awards, 2016 Building of the Year (East), Grace Farms
- AIA Connecticut 2016 Design Honor Award, Grace Farms
- Illuminating Engineering Society, 2016 Lumen Awards, Award of Merit, BuroHappold for Grace Farms
- 2016 Architizer A+Awards, Architecture +Engineering, Grace Farms
- Greater New York Construction User Council, 2016 Chairman's Reception, Public Space, Grace Farms
- Engineering News-Record (ENR) New England, Best Project Winner for Culture/Worship category, August 2016, Grace Farms
- The Ceilings & Interior Systems Construction Association (CISCA), 2015
- Construction Excellence Award in Acoustical Solutions East Region - Gold, Grace Farms
- TownVibe, 2016 Green Award, Grace Farms
- LEED Silver Certification for Operations and Maintenance, 2019

== See also ==
- Philip Johnson Glass House
