= Rolex Learning Center =

Campus building in Switzerland

Coordinates: 46°31′06″N 6°34′05″E

EPFL Learning Center
- Alternative names: Rolex Learning Center; Bibliothèque de l'EPFL

General information
- Type: Library, workspaces, multi-purpose hall "Forum Rolex", café, food court, restaurant, offices, bookshop and parking
- Location: Lausanne campus, Écublens, Lausanne
- Opened: 22 February 2010
- Inaugurated: 27 May 2010
- Cost: 110 million CHF
- Owner: École polytechnique fédérale de Lausanne

Technical details
- Floor count: 1 + basement
- Floor area: 37,000 m^{2}
- Grounds: 20,000 m^{2} (166.5 m × 121.5 m)

Design and construction
- Architects: Kazuyo Sejima and Ryue Nishizawa (SANAA)
- Known for: Innovative architecture: large one-room space, floor undulations and curved patios

Website
- rolexlearningcenter.epfl.ch

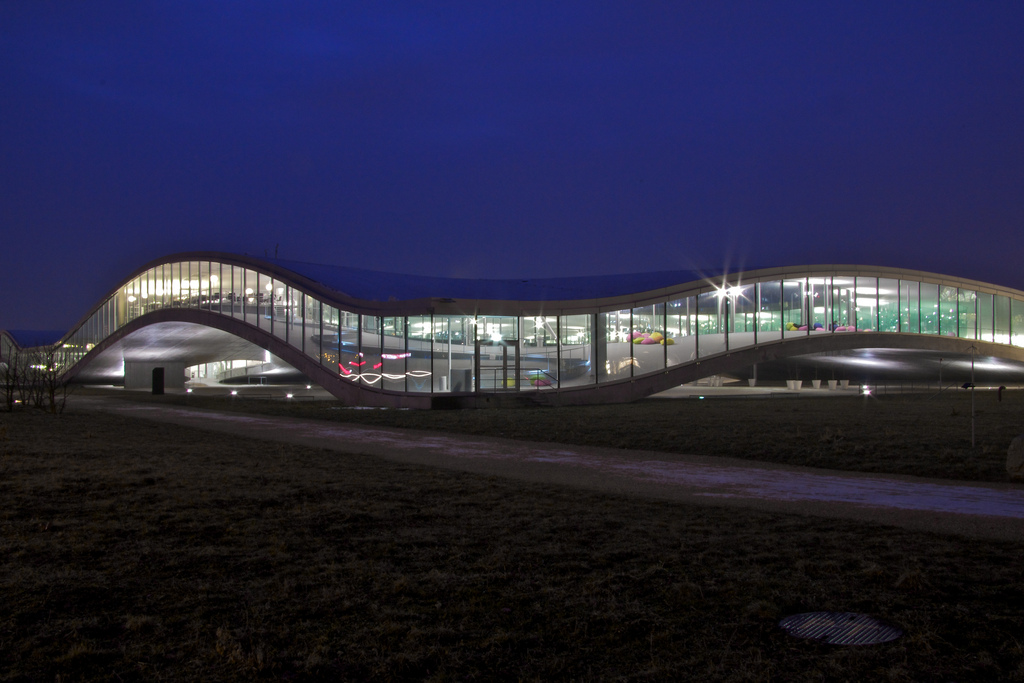
EPFL Learning Center, in 2012

The Rolex Learning Center is a public library and the main research library of EPFL, the Swiss Federal Institute of Technology in Lausanne. Designed by the winners of 2010 Pritzker Prize, Japanese-duo SANAA, it was inaugurated on 22 February 2010.

== History ==
Kazuyo Sejima and Ryue Nishizawa, partners of the Tokyo-based design firm SANAA, were selected as the lead architects in EPFL's international competition in December 2004. The team was selected among famous architects, including Pritzker Prize Laureates such as Zaha Hadid, Rem Koolhaas, Diller Scofidio + Renfro, Jean Nouvel, Herzog & de Meuron, Ábalos & Herreros and Xaveer De Geyter.

The construction took place between 2007 and 2009. It cost 110 million Swiss francs and was funded by the Swiss government as well as by private sponsors, Rolex, Logitech, Bouygues Construction, Crédit Suisse, Nestlé, Novartis and SICPA.

The building opened on 22 February 2010 and was inaugurated on 27 May 2010.

=== Library ===
The main library, containing 500,000 printed works, is one of the largest scientific collections in Europe; four large study areas can accommodate 860 students with office space for over 100 EPFL and other employees; a multimedia library will give access to 10,000 online journals and 17,000 e-books, with advanced lending machines and systems for bibliographic search; a study center for use by postgraduate researchers will provide access to the universityʼs major archive and research collection, and there are teaching areas including ten "bubbles" for seminars, group work and other meetings and a Language and Multimedia Center and associated administration offices.

== Main functions ==
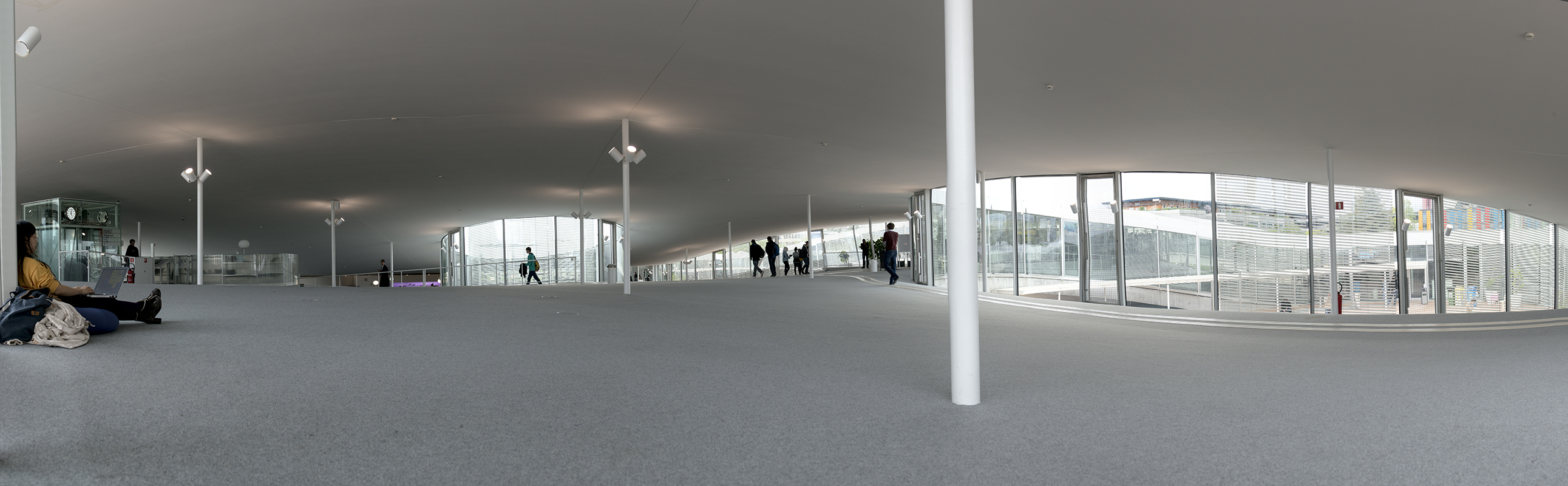
Interior of the building

- Multimedia library – 500,000+ volumes
- Student workspaces – 860 seats
- Multipurpose hall "Forum Rolex" – 600 seats
- Café and bar – 53 seats + exterior
- Food court – 128 seats + exterior
- Restaurant – 80 seats
- Career Center
- Library staff office
- EPFL Precious Book Collection
- Student Association Office (AGEPoly)
- Alumni department (EPFL Alumni)
- Research Laboratory for Computer-Human Interaction in Learning and Instruction
- Center for Digital Education - CEDE
- Presses polytechniques et universitaires romandes (EPFL Press)
- Bookshop "La Fontaine"
- Parking (500 places)

== Events ==
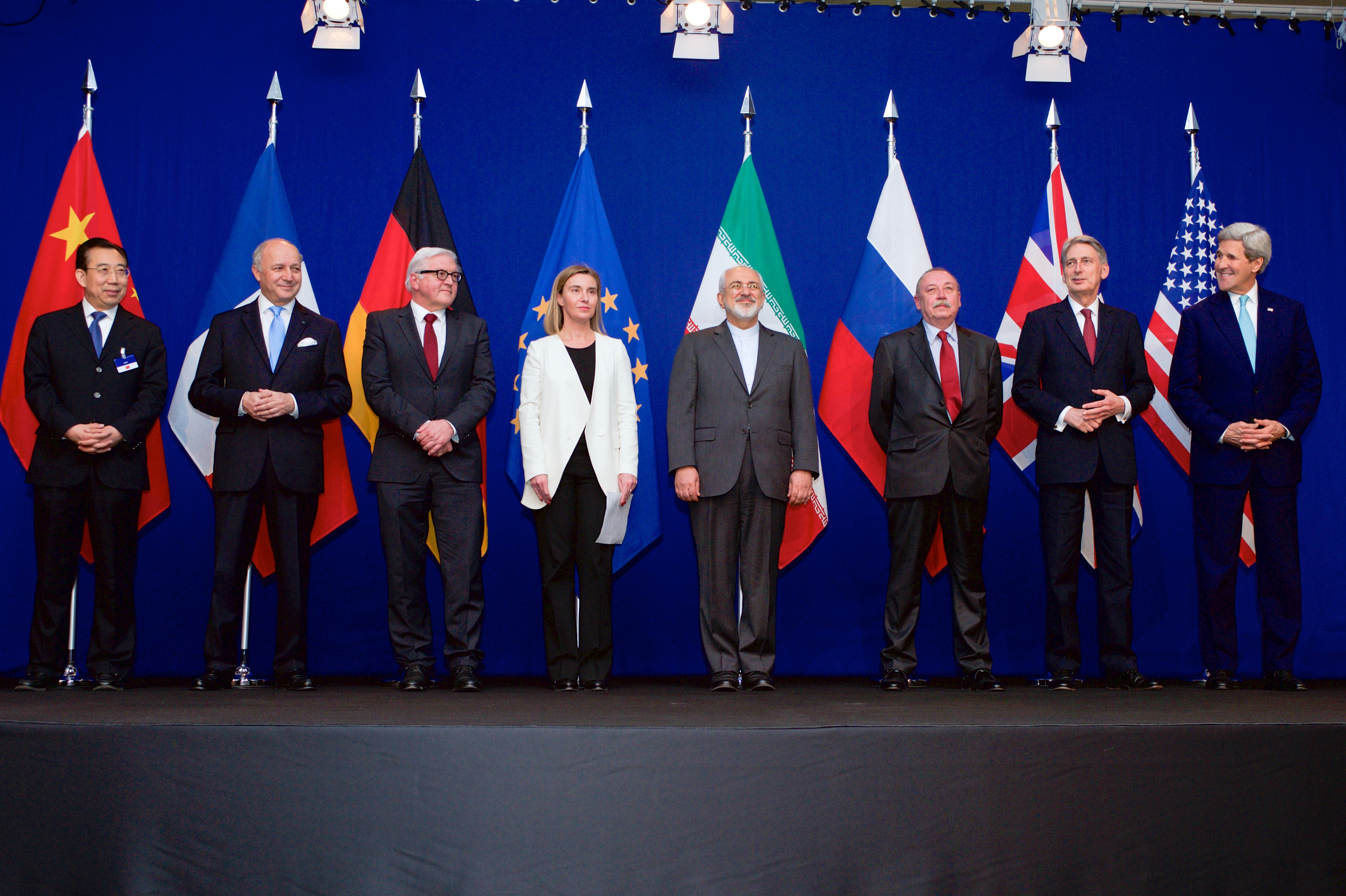
The ministers of foreign affairs of France, Germany, the European Union, Iran, the United Kingdom and the United States as well as Chinese and Russian diplomats announcing the framework of a Comprehensive agreement on the Iranian nuclear programme, in the "Forum Rolex" auditorium of the EPFL Learning Center (2 April 2015)

On 2 April 2015, the press conference of Federica Mogherini (High Representative of the European Union for Foreign Affairs) and Mohammad Javad Zarif (Minister of Foreign Affairs of Iran) following the negotiations of the ministers of foreign affairs of the United States, the United Kingdom, Russia, Germany, France, China, the European Union and Iran for a Comprehensive agreement on the Iranian nuclear programme (in the previous days at the Beau-Rivage Palace) was held in the Learning Center.

== In popular culture ==
Part of the 2014 film Love Is the Perfect Crime was filmed at the EPFL Learning Center.

== See also ==
- Cantonal and University Library of Lausanne
- Lausanne campus
