= Presses polytechniques et universitaires romandes =

- Parent company: École Polytechnique Fédérale de Lausanne
- Status: university press
- Founded: 1980; 45 years ago
- Country of origin: Switzerland
- Headquarters location: Rolex Learning Center
- Key people: Jacques Neirynck
- Nonfiction topics: Scientific, engineering, technology, research
- Fiction genres: Academic, scientific
- Imprints: EPFL Press; Épistémé; Quanto; Éditions 41; Savoir suisse
- Official website: www.epflpress.org

The EPFL Press, formerly Presses polytechniques et universitaires romandes (PPUR), is a Swiss independent scientific publishing house and a university press affiliated with the École Polytechnique Fédérale de Lausanne (EPFL) in Lausanne, Switzerland. EPFL Press was founded in 1980 and is based on the EPFL campus, in the Rolex Learning Center.

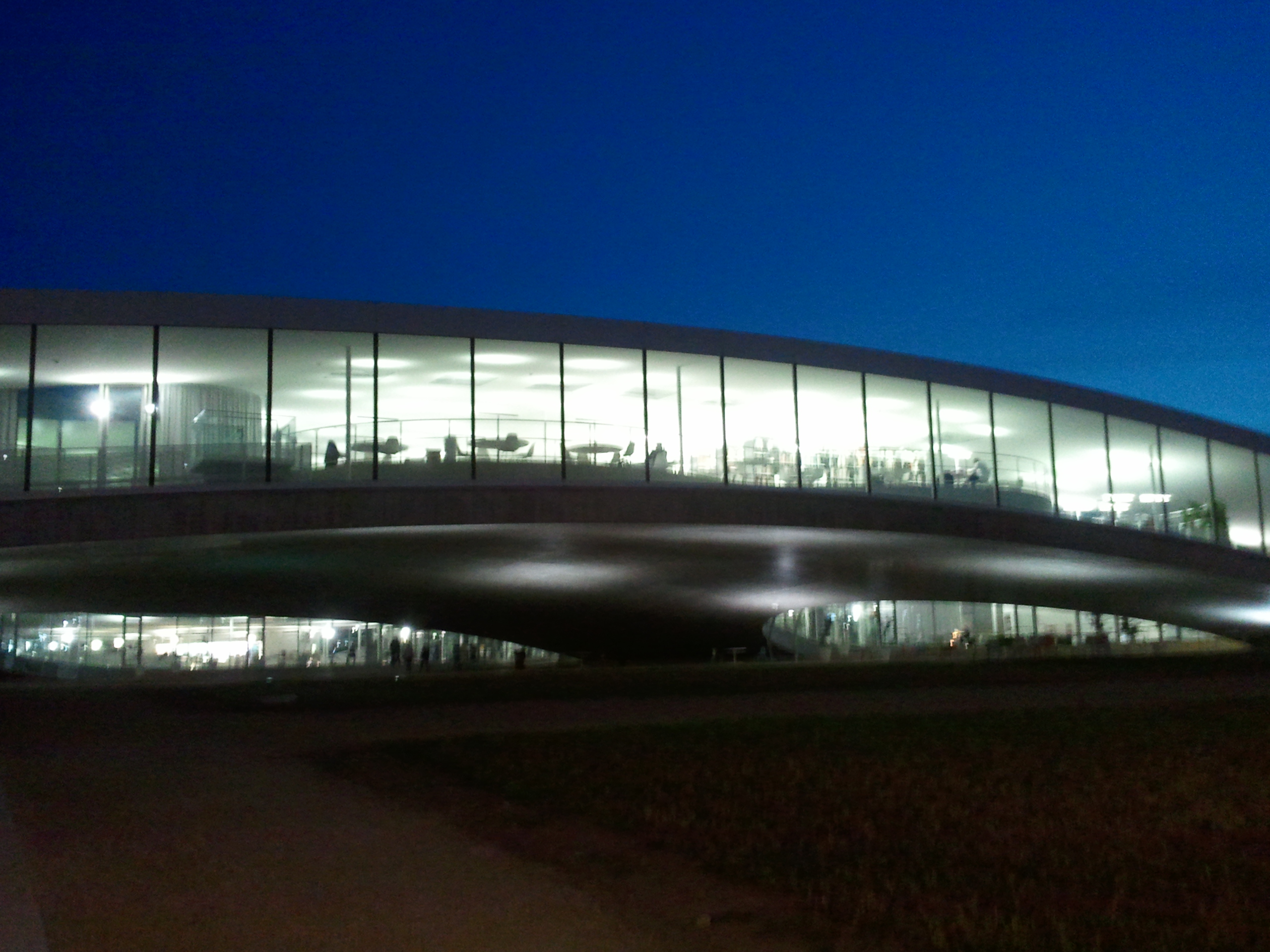
Rolex Learning Center in Lausanne

== Publications ==
The EPFL Press publishes Le savoir suisse. This series was created in 2002 in collaboration with Bertil Galland. Between 2002 and 2012, it edited 88 books and sold 150,000 copies (in French). Twenty-eight of these books were translated, mainly into German.

== See also ==
- List of English-language book publishing companies
- List of publishing companies
- List of university presses
