= SANAA =

Tokyo based Japanese architecture studio

SANAA (Sejima and Nishizawa and Associates) is an architectural firm based in Tokyo, Japan. It was founded in 1995 by architects Kazuyo Sejima and Ryue Nishizawa, who were awarded the Pritzker Prize in 2010. Notable works include the Toledo Museum of Art's Glass Pavilion in Toledo, Ohio; Grace Farms in New Canaan, Connecticut; the New Museum of Contemporary Art in New York; the Rolex Learning Center at the EPFL in Lausanne; the Serpentine Pavilion in London; the Christian Dior Building in Omotesandō, Tokyo; the 21st Century Museum of Contemporary Art in Kanazawa; the Louvre-Lens Museum in France; and the Bocconi New Campus in Milan.

== History ==
Kazuyo Sejima and Ryue Nishizawa founded SANAA in 1995. They later won the Golden Lion in 2004 for the most significant work in the Ninth International Architecture Exhibition of the Venice Biennale. In 2010, they were awarded the Pritzker Prize, which made Sejima the second woman to win this prize. In 2025, they were awarded the Royal Institute of British Architects' Royal Gold Medal for architecture, recognising "their long-term commitment to projects that prioritise inclusivity and accessibility".

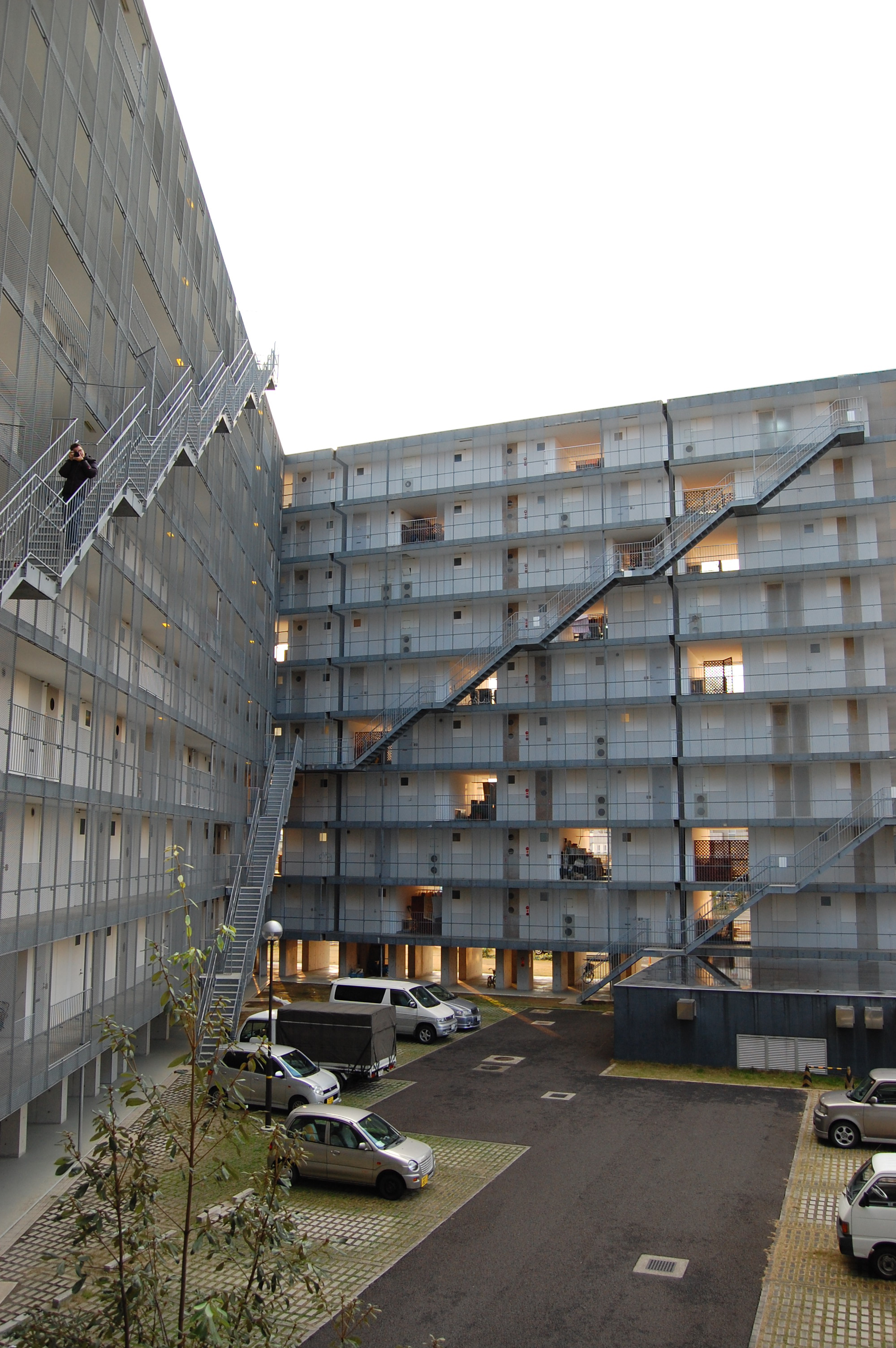
Kitagata Housing project by SANAA

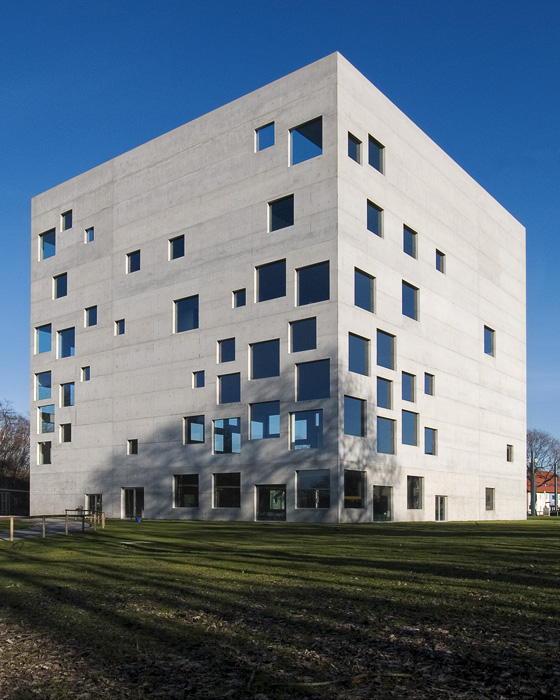
Zollverein School of Management and Design (Essen/Germany) by SANAA

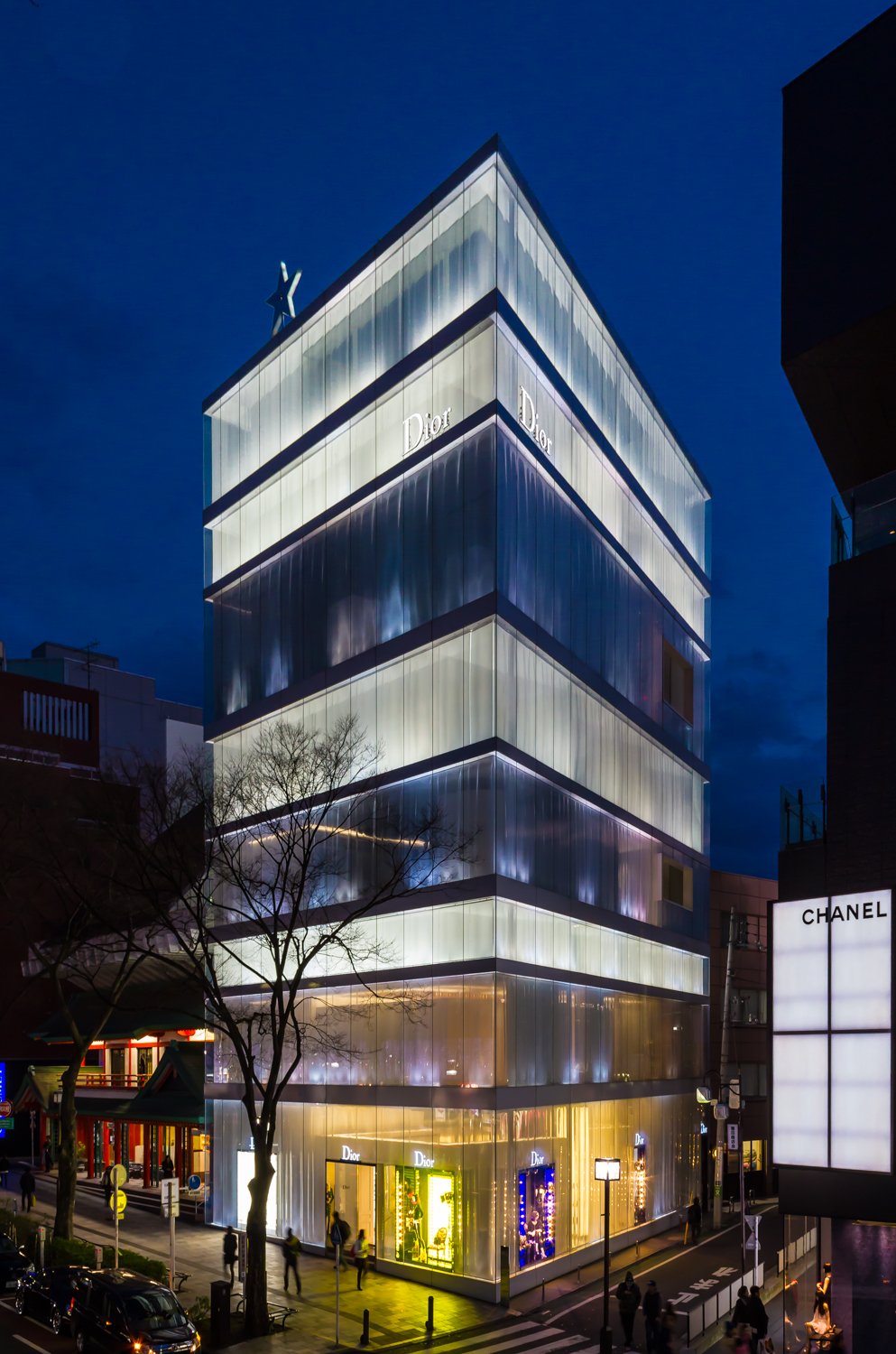
Christian Dior building, Omotesandō

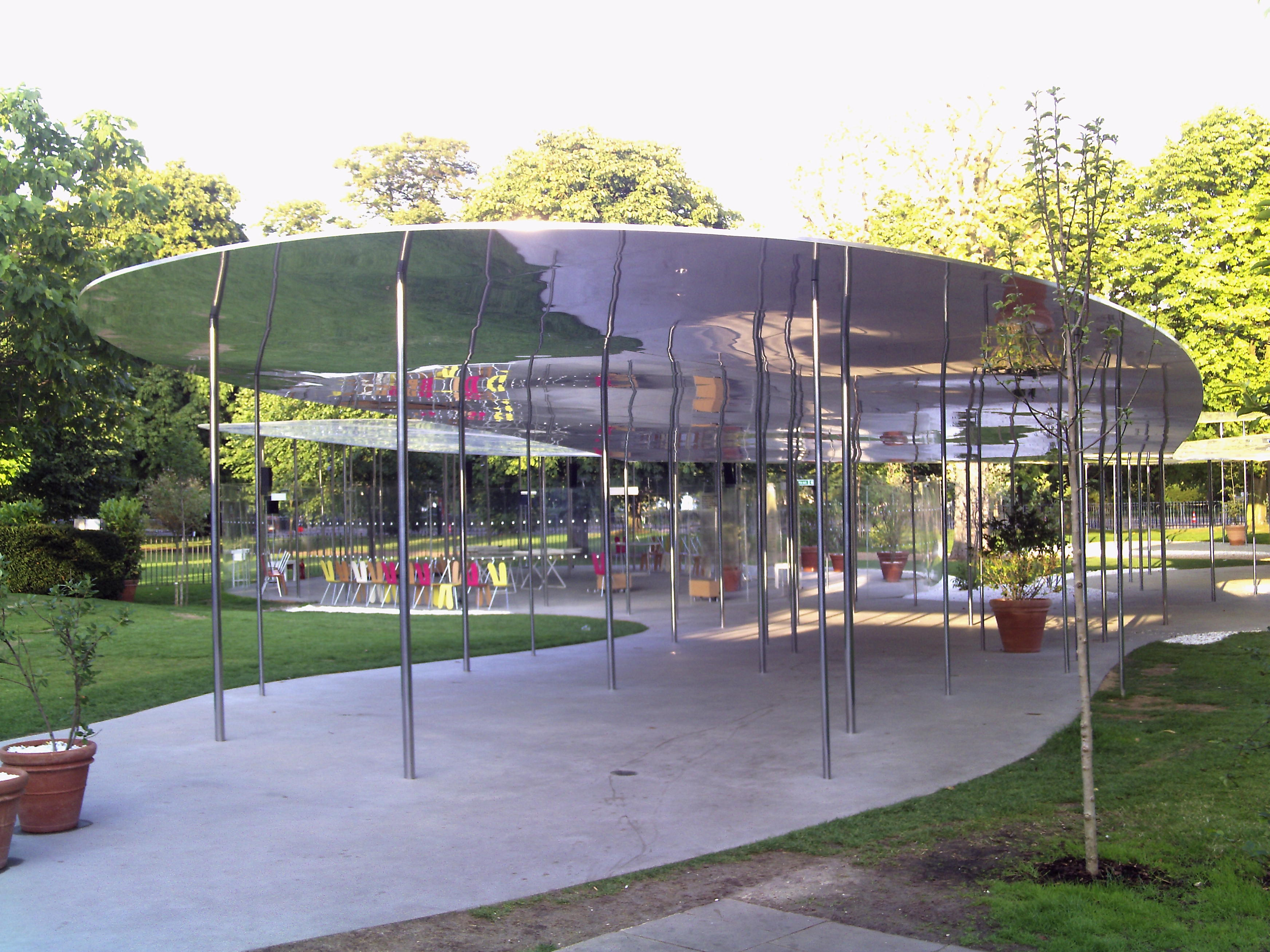
Serpentine Gallery Pavilion, 2009

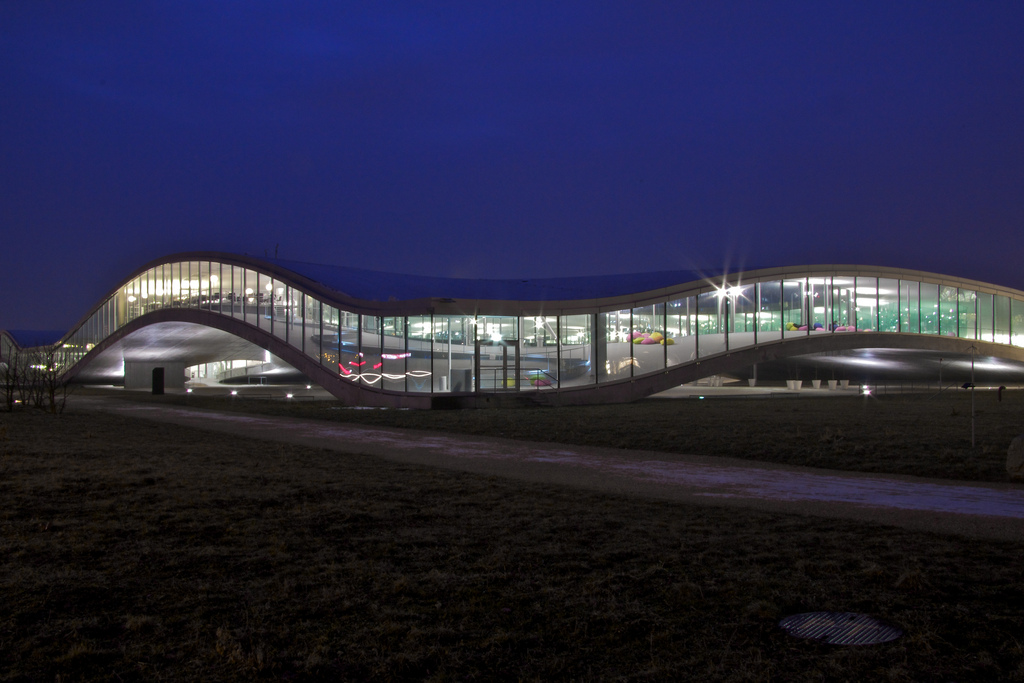
The EPFL Learning Centre, Lausanne (Switzerland).

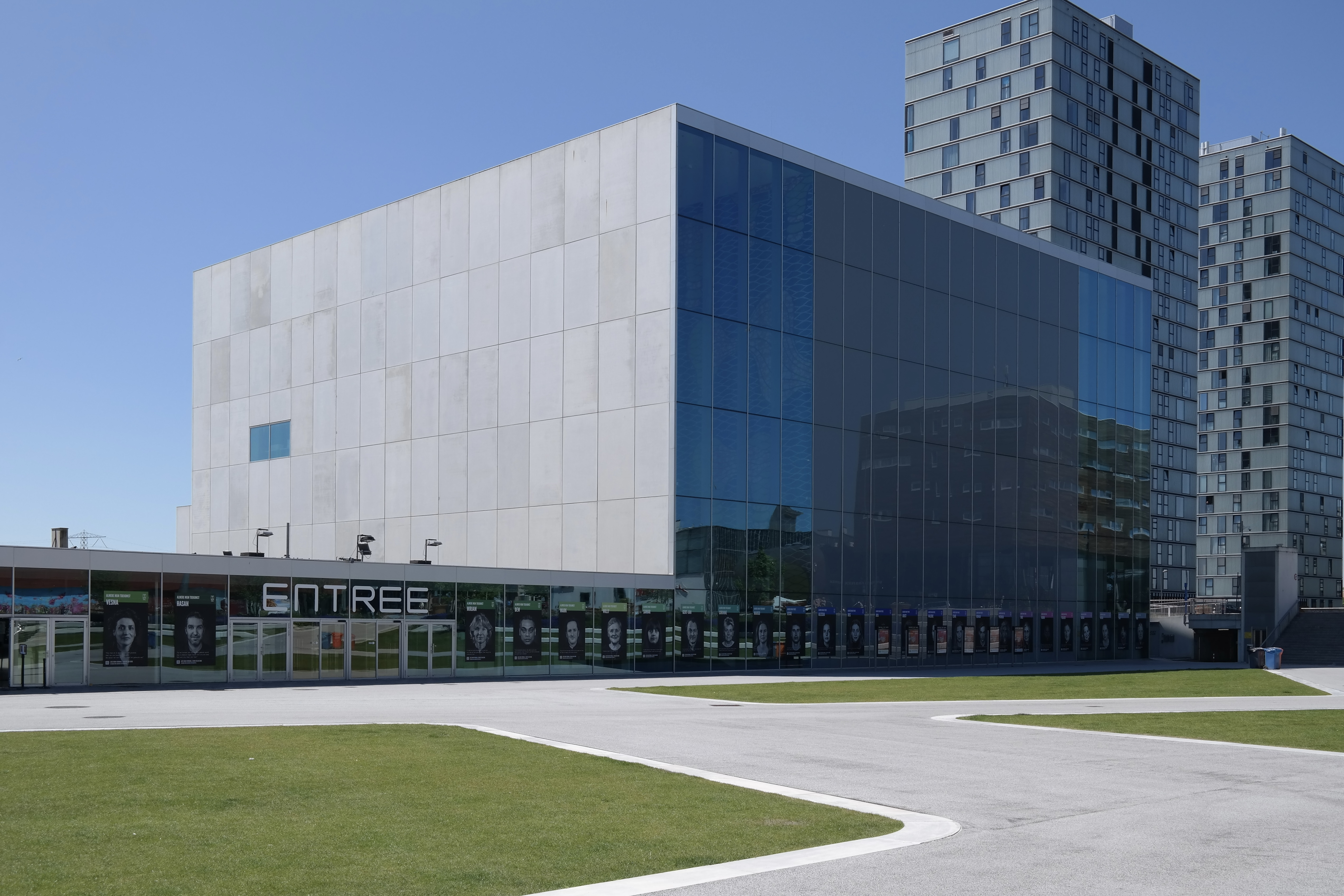
De Kunstlinie Theater & Cultural Center, Almere (The Netherlands)

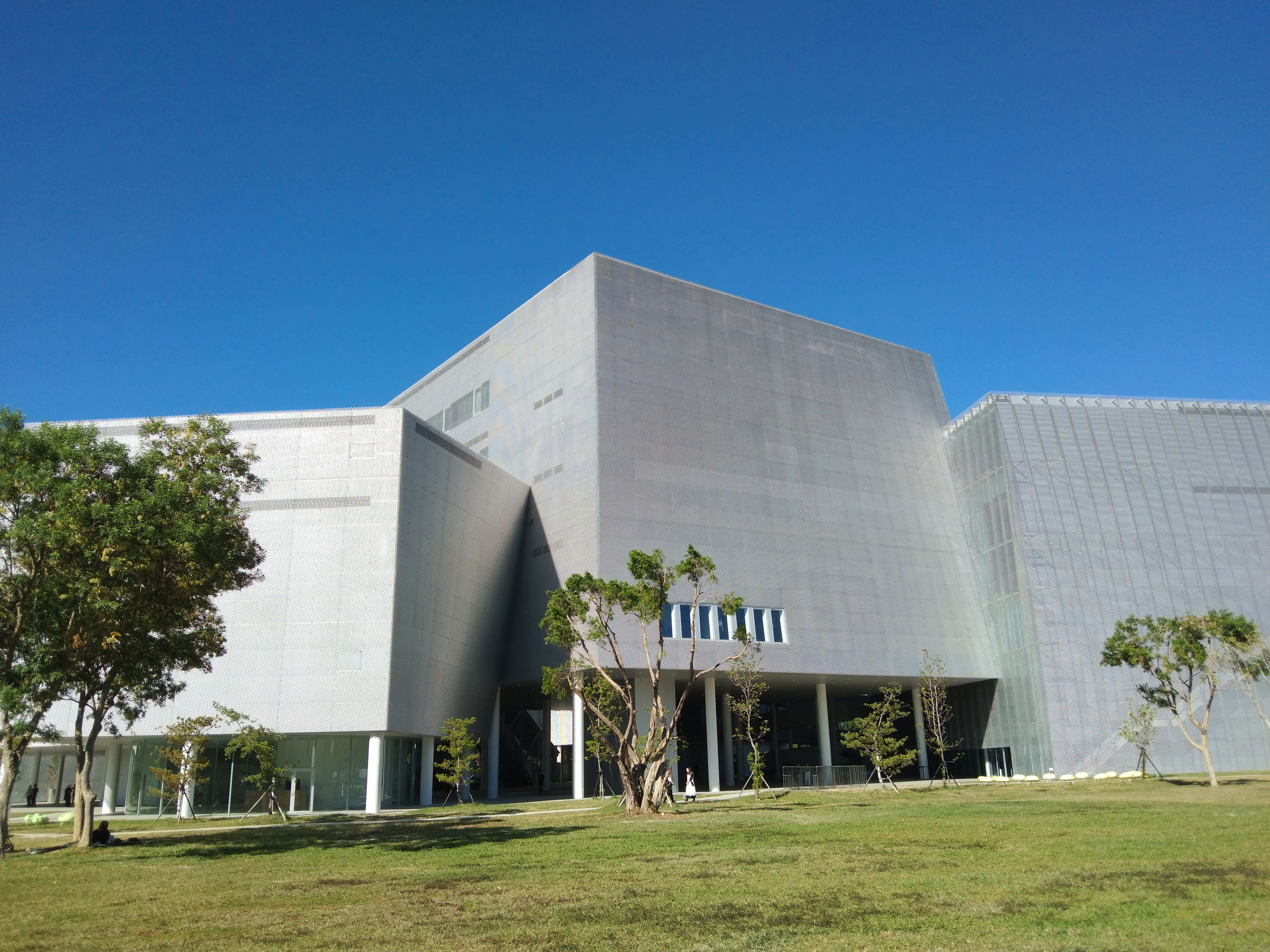
Taichung Main Public Library (Taichung Green Museumbrary) (Taiwan)

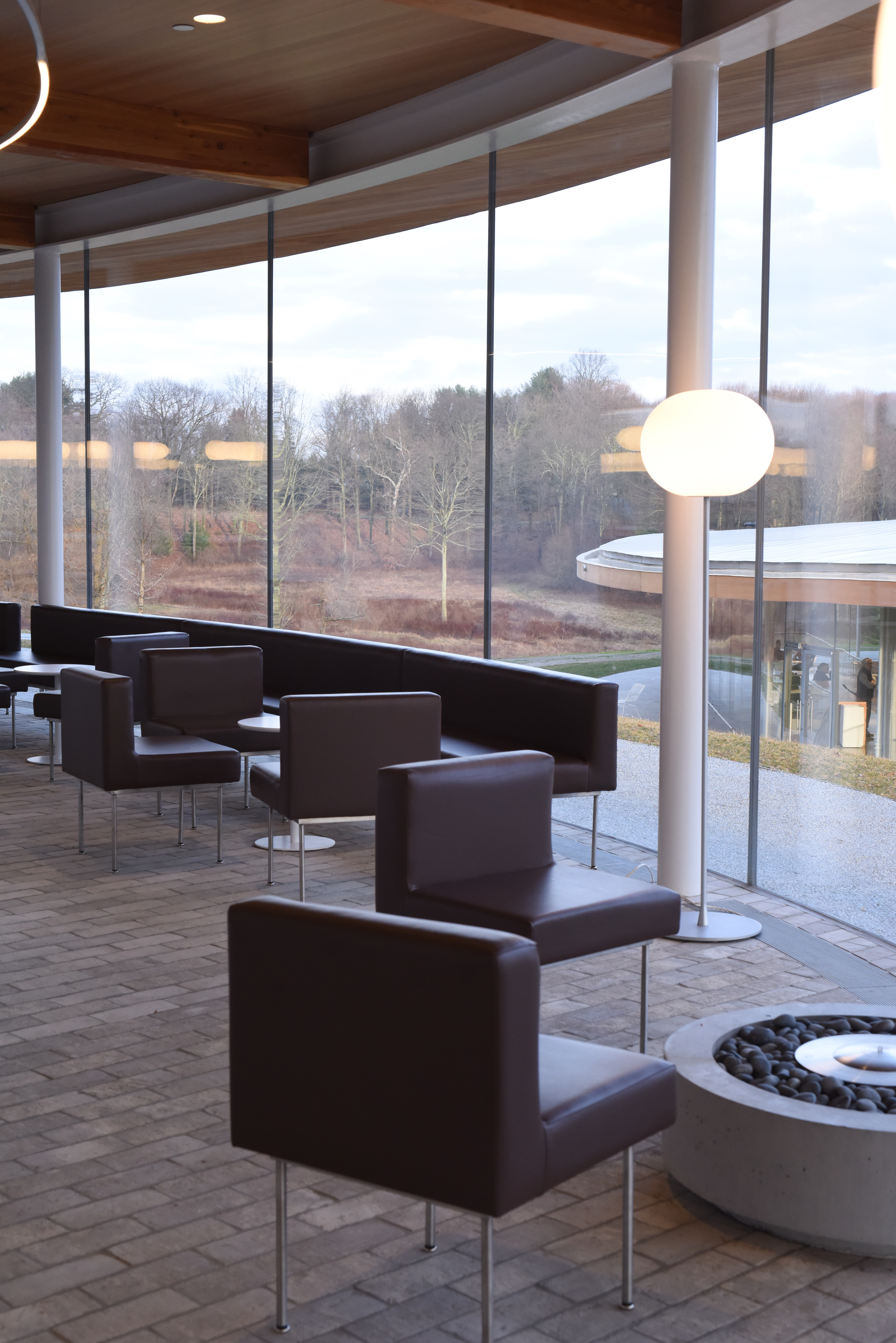
Grace Farms Interior, with floor to ceiling windows.

== Projects ==
Australia

- Art Gallery of New South Wales, North Building – 2022
- Museum of Contemporary Art (Not Built/Project Only) – 1997 to 1999 – Sydney, Australia

China

- House for the CIPEA (China International Practical Exhibition of Architecture) – 2004 to Present – Nanjing, China

England

- Serpentine Gallery Pavilion – 2009 – London, England

France

- Louvre-Lens – 2005 to 2012 – Lens, Pas-de-Calais, France

Germany

- Mercedes-Benz Museum (Not Built/Project Only) – 2002 – Stuttgart, Germany
- Zollverein School of Design – 2003 to 2006 – Essen, Germany

Japan

- Multimedia Studio – 1995 to 1996 – Gifu, Japan
- N Museum – 1995 to 1997 – Wakayama, Japan
- O Museum – 1995 to 1999 – Nagano, Japan
- S House – 1995 to 1996 – Okayama, Japan
- M House – 1996 to 1997 – Tokyo, Japan
- K Office Building – 1996 to 1997 – Ibaraki, Japan
- Koga Park Café – 1997 to 1998 – Ibaraki, Japan
- Welfare Center – 1997 – Kanagawa, Japan
- 21st Century Museum of Contemporary Art – 1999 to 2004 – Kanazawa, Ishikawa, Japan
- Dior Omotesando Store – 2001 to 2003 – Tokyo, Japan
- Issey Miyake Store by Naoki Takizawa – 2003 – Tokyo, Japan
- Naoshima Ferry Terminal – 2003 to 2006 – Kagawa, Japan

Netherlands

- De Kunstlinie Theater & Cultural Center – 1998 to 2006 – Almere, Netherlands
- Lumiere Park Café – 1999 to Present – Almere, Netherlands

Israel

- The Jack, Joseph and Morton Mandel Campus of the Bezalel Academy of Arts and Design – 2023 – Jerusalem, Israel

Italy

- Proposal for Reclaiming Salerno's Inner City – 1999 to Present – Italy
- Prada Beauty Store – 2000 – Arezzo, Italy
- Installation for the Japan Pavilion at the Venice Biennale – 2000 – Venice, Italy
- Bocconi New Campus – 2019 – Milan, Italy

Spain

- Extension to the Institut Valencià d'Art Modern – 2002 to Present – Valencia, Spain

Switzerland

- Extension to the Rietberg Museum (Not Built/Project Only) – 2002 – Zurich, Switzerland
- Novartis Office Building – 2003 to Present – Basel, Switzerland
- Rolex Learning Center at the École Polytechnique Fédérale de Lausanne – 2004 to 2010 – Lausanne, Switzerland

Taiwan

- Taichung Green Museumbrary – 2022 – Taichung, Taiwan

United States

- The New Campus Center of the Illinois Institute of Technology (Not Built/Project Only) – 1998 – Chicago, Illinois, USA
- Grace Farms – 2015 – New Canaan, Connecticut, USA
- The Glass Pavilion at the Toledo Museum of Art – 2001 to 2006 – Toledo, Ohio, USA
- The New Museum of Contemporary Art – 2003 to 2007 – New York City, USA

== Awards ==
SANAA's work was included in the exhibition City of Girls in the Japanese Pavilion at the 2000 Venice Biennale and in the Garden Cafe at the 7th International Istanbul Biennale, Istanbul, Turkey. Their work has also been exhibited at Zumtobel Staff-Lichtforum, Vienna, Austria; Institut Valencia d'Art Modern, Valencia, Spain; Zeche Zollverein, Essen, Germany; Gallery MA, Tokyo, Japan; N-museum, Wakayama, Japan and New Museum of Contemporary Art, New York. SANAA has been awarded the Golden Lion for the most remarkable work in the exhibition Metamorph in the 9th International Architecture Exhibition, La Biennale di Venezia in 2004, the 46th Mainichi Shinbun Arts Award (Architecture Category) in 2005, and the Schock Prize in the visual arts, also in 2005. In 2010, Sejima and Nishizawa were awarded the Pritzker Prize, the highest of honours in architecture.
