= Kazuyo Sejima =

Japanese architect

- 妹島 和世
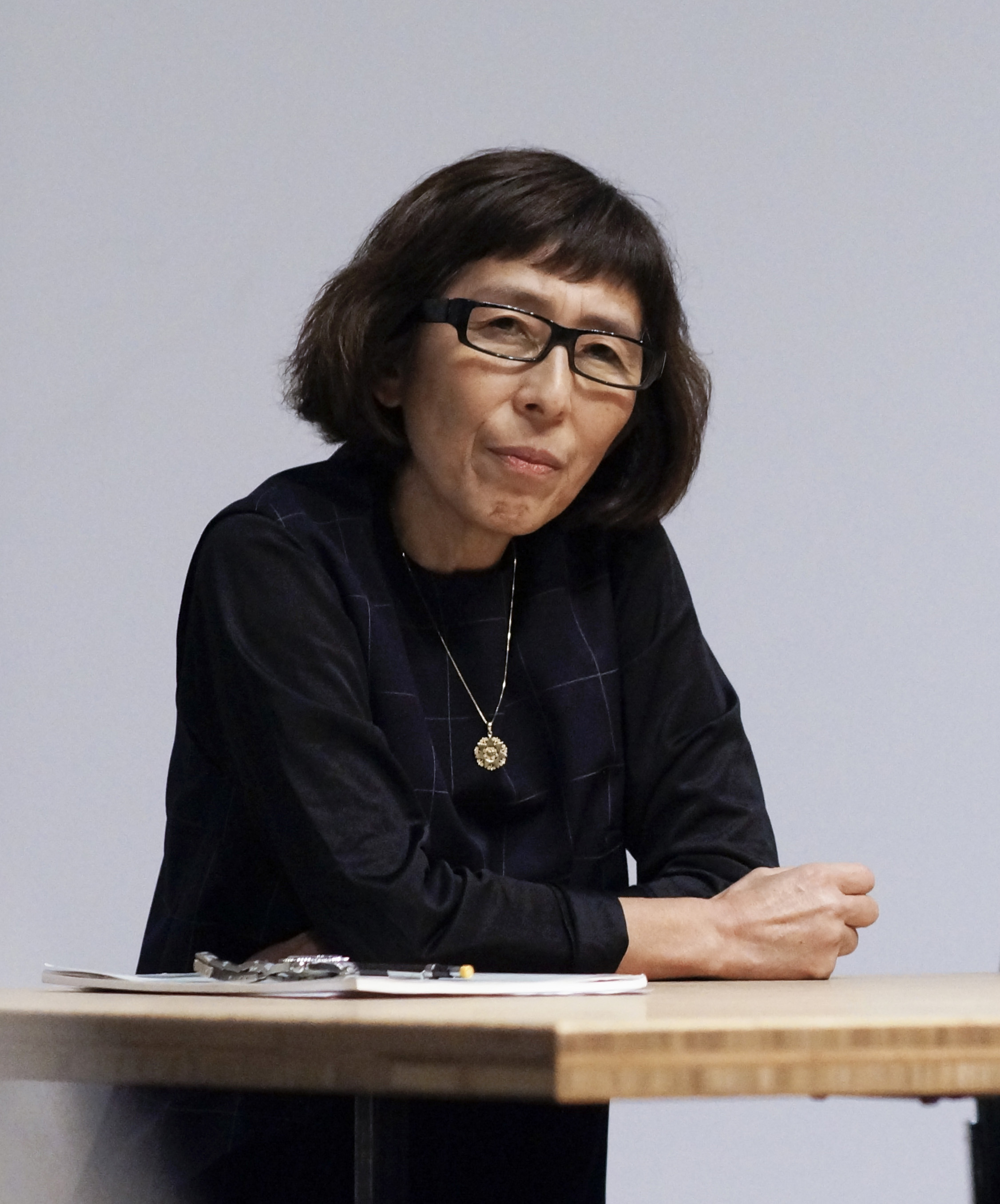
- Sejima in 2014
- Born: 29 October 1956 (age 69); Hitachi, Ibaraki Prefecture, Japan
- Occupation: Architect
- Awards: Rolf Schock Prize (2005); Pritzker Prize (2010); RIBA Royal Gold Medal (2025)
- Practice: Kazuyo Sejima and Associates (1987–1995); SANAA (since 1995)

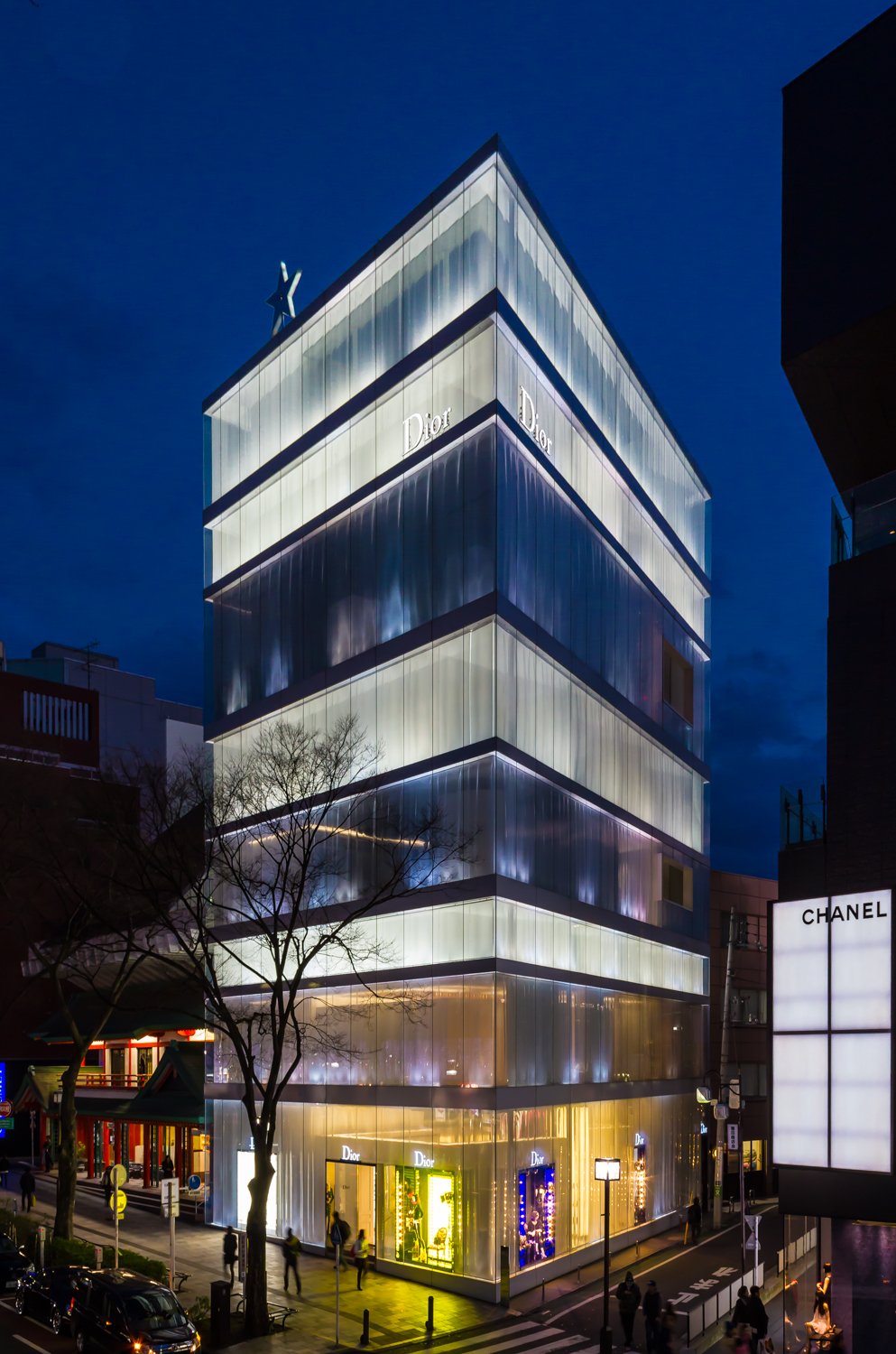
Christian Dior building, Omotesandō

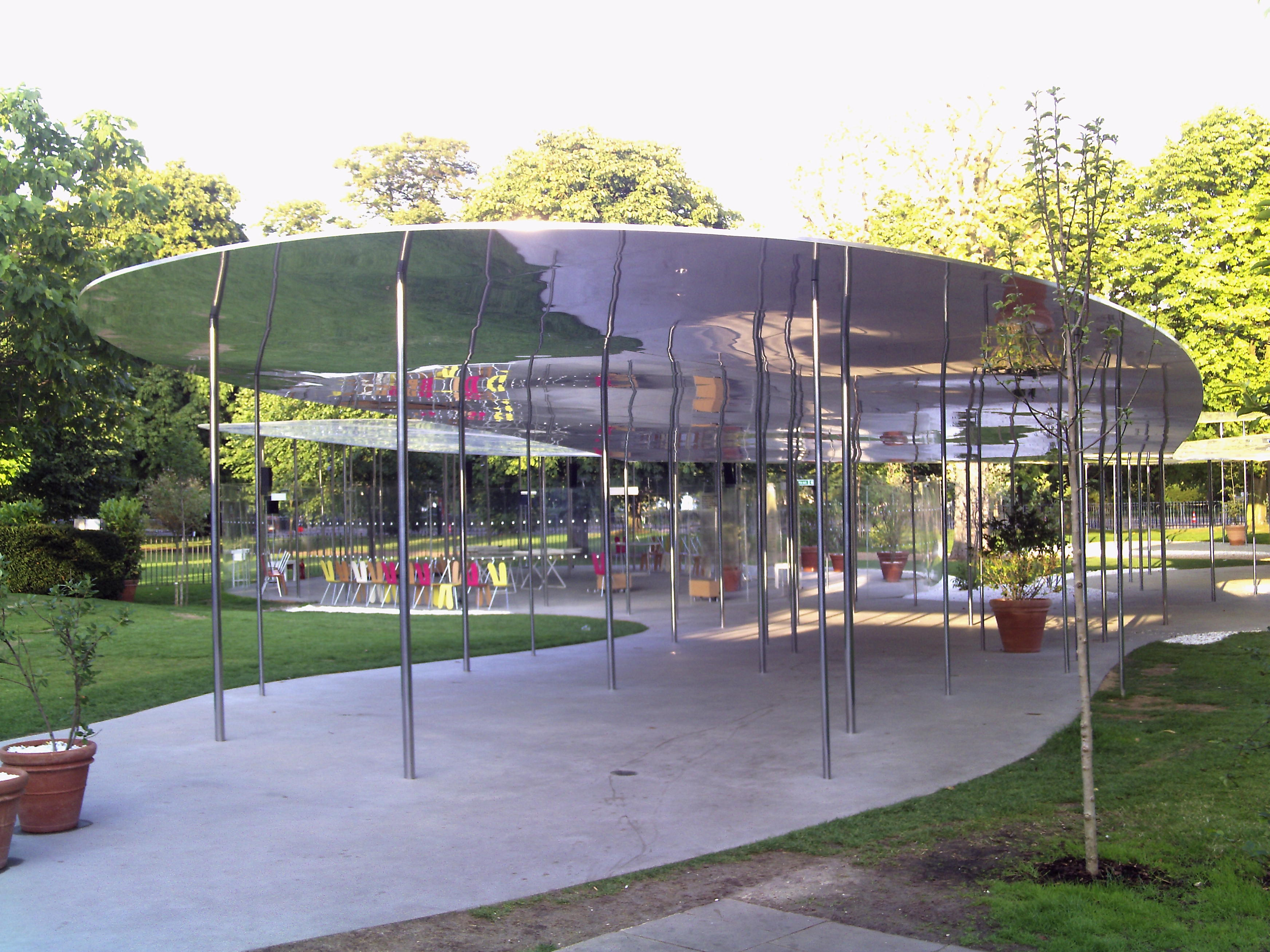
Serpentine Gallery Pavilion, 2009

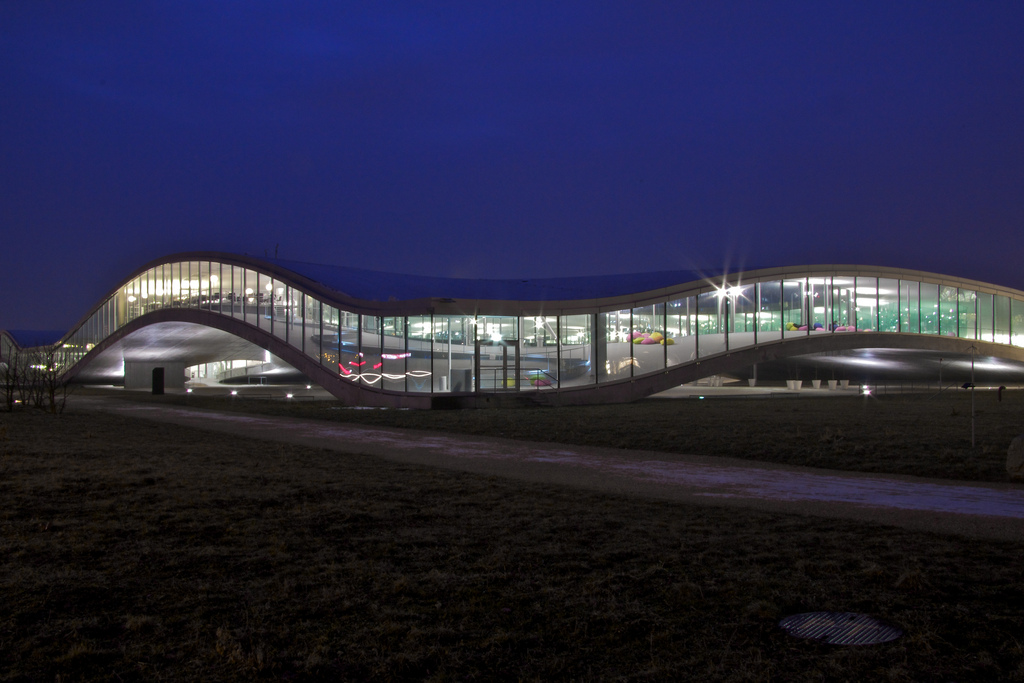
The EPFL Learning Centre, Lausanne (Switzerland).

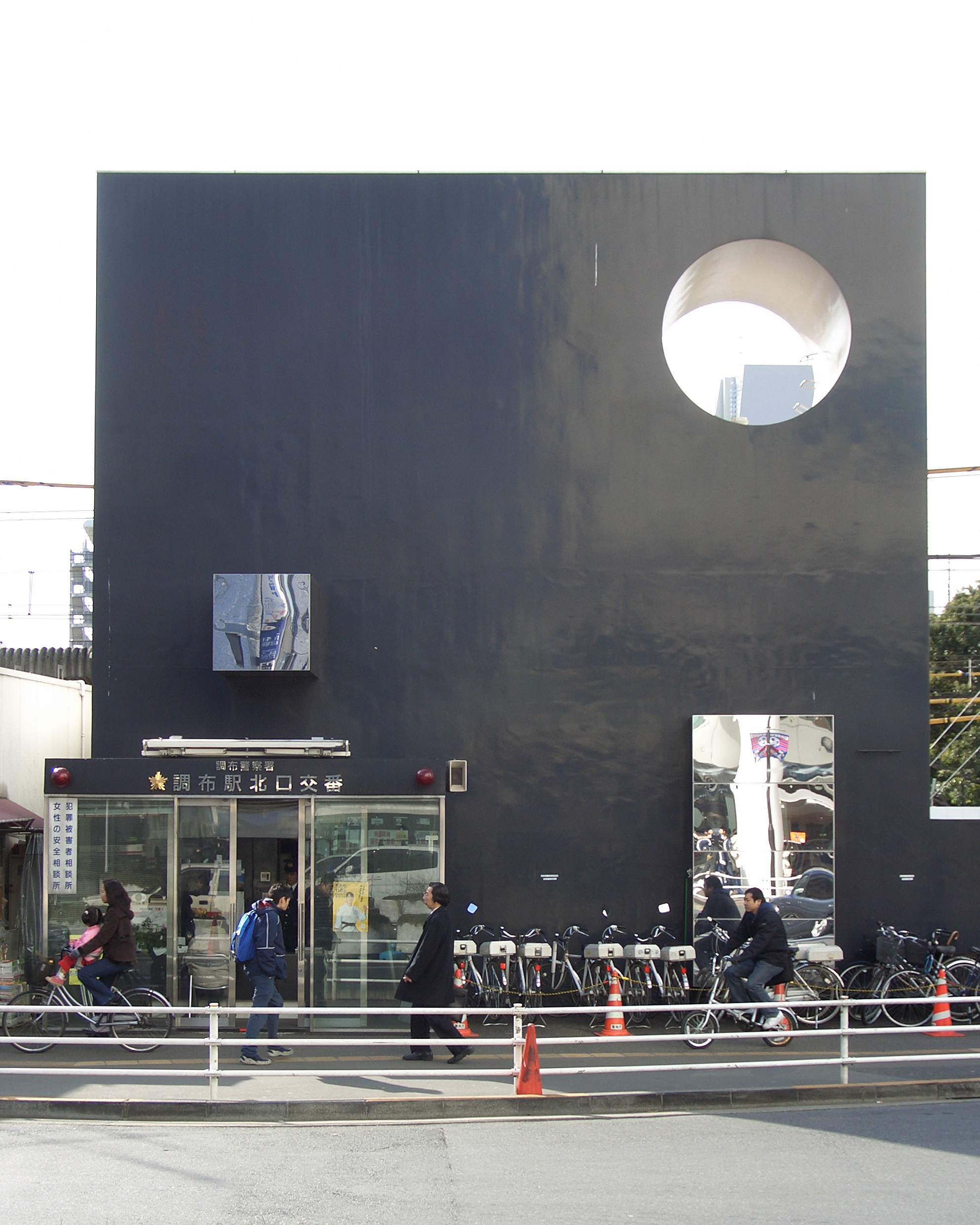
Police box outside Chofu Station in Tokyo (1993–94)

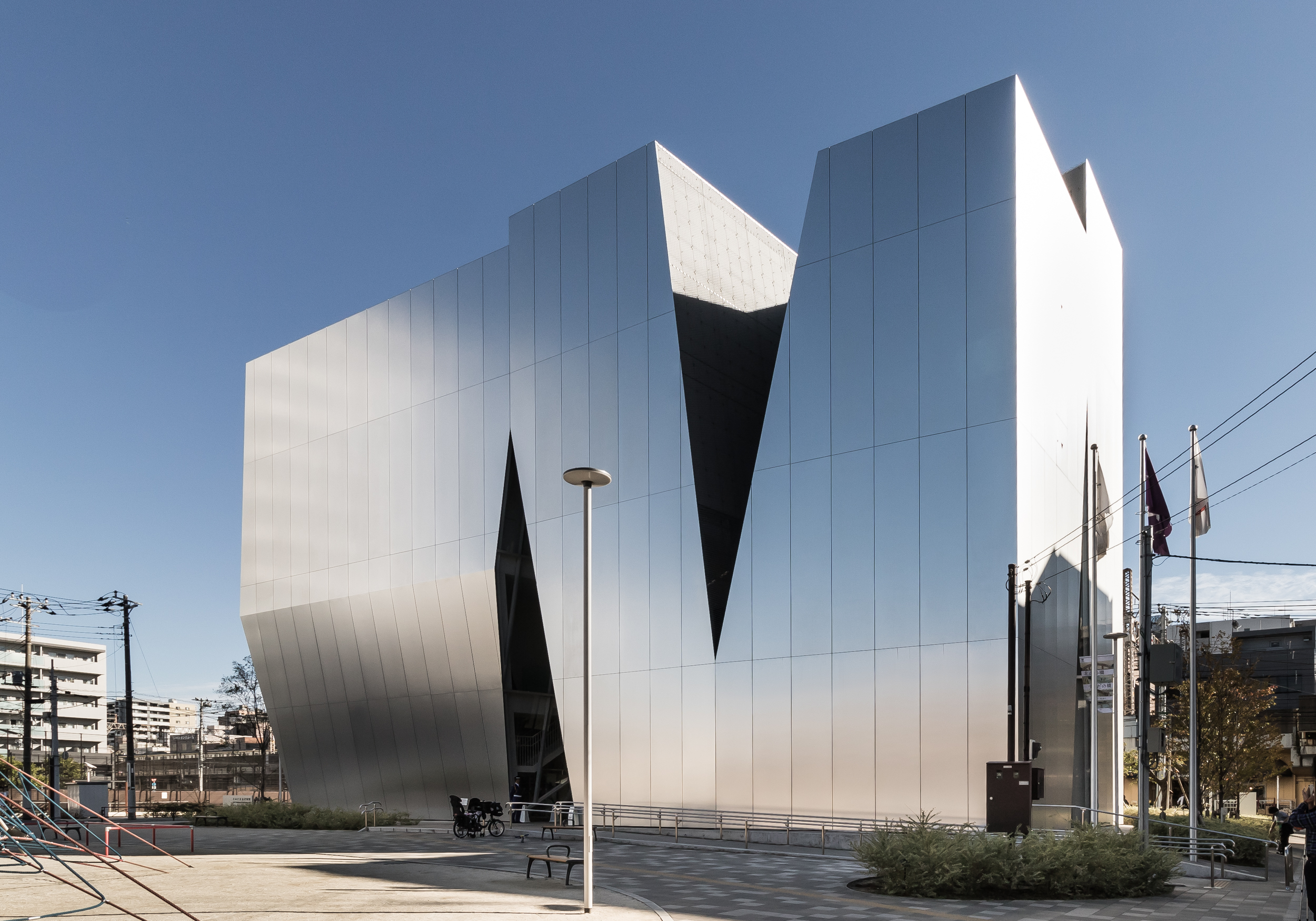
Sumida Hokusai Museum.Tokyo, Japan(2016)

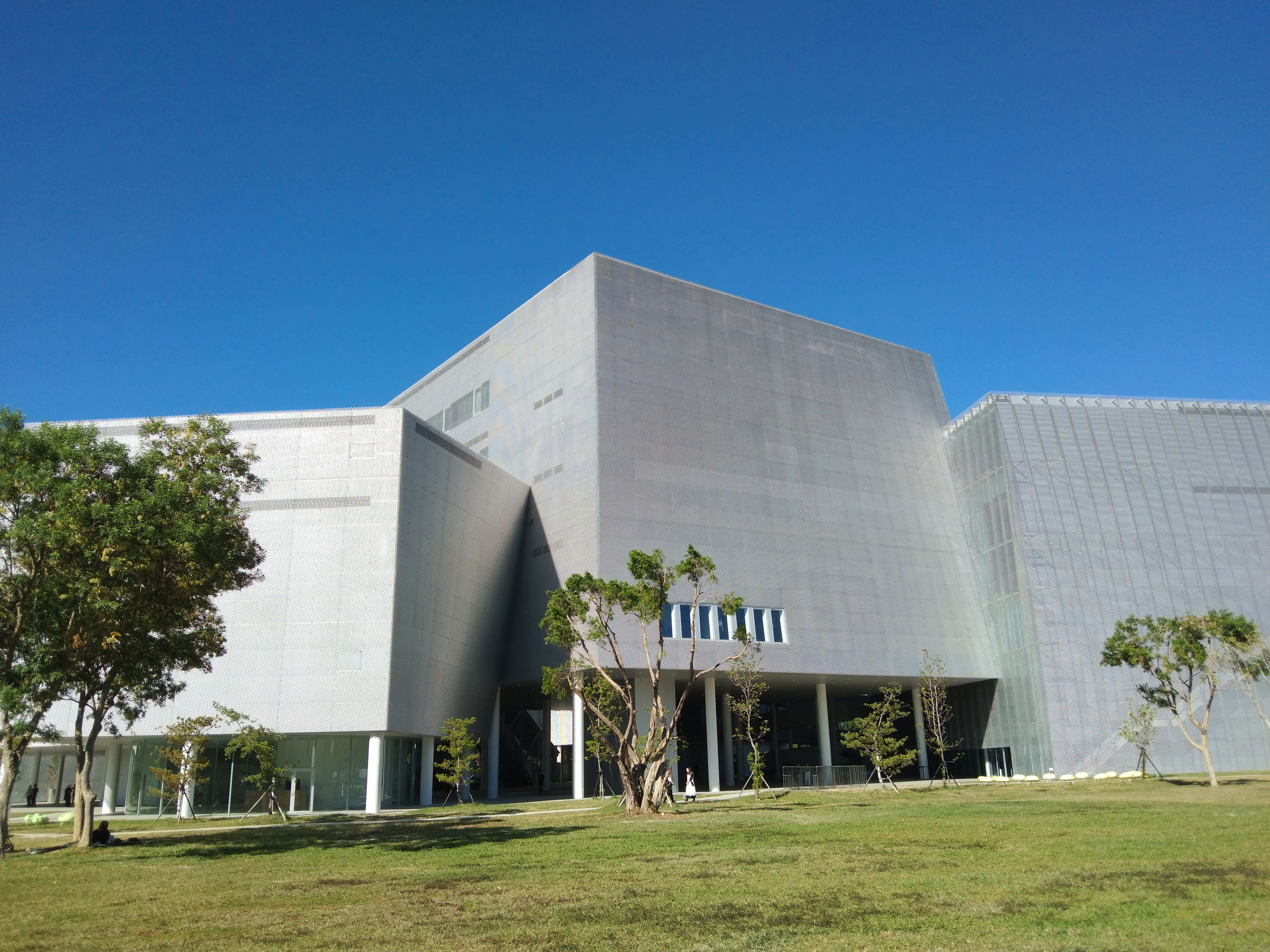
Taichung Main Public Library (Taichung Green Museumbrary), Taiwan

Kazuyo Sejima (妹島 和世, Sejima Kazuyo; born 29 October 1956) is a Japanese architect and director of her own firm, Kazuyo Sejima & Associates. In 1995, she co-founded the firm SANAA (Sejima + Nishizawa & Associates). In 2010, Sejima was the second woman to receive the Pritzker Prize, which was awarded jointly with Nishizawa. They were only the second partnership to be honored with this prize.

== Early life and education ==
Sejima was born on 29 October 1956 in Mito, Ibaraki, Japan. Her mother, although not employed, was highly educated; her father was a welding engineer.

Sejima graduated from Japan Women's University in 1979. She then went on to complete the master's degree course in architecture in 1981. In the same year, she began working with the architecture firm Toyo Ito and Associates until 1987.

== Career ==
After apprenticing with Toyo Ito, Sejima established Kazuyo Sejima & Associates in 1987. One of her first hires was Ryue Nishizawa, a student who had worked with Sejima at Toyo Ito and Associates. After working for Sejima for several years, Sejima asked him to form a partnership. In 1995, the two founded the Tokyo-based firm SANAA (Sejima and Nishizawa and Associates). In 2010, Sejima was appointed director of architecture sector for the Venice Biennale, which she curated for the 12th Annual International Architecture Exhibition. She was the first woman ever selected for this position. In 2010, she was awarded the Pritzker Prize, together with Ryue Nishizawa.

== Major works ==
- Saishunkan Seiyaku Women's Dormitory, Kumamoto, Japan (1990–1991)
- Competition for Nasunogahara Harmony Hall (1991)
- Competition for Chuya Nakahara Memorial Museum (1992)
- Gifu Kitagata Apartment, Gifu, Japan (1994)
- Ogasawara Museum, Nagado, Japan
- Multi Media Studio, Ōgaki, Gifu, Japan (1995)
- Competition for New Campus Center for Illinois Institute of Technology (1997–1998)
- 'De Kunstlinie' Theatre and Cultural Centre, Almere, Netherlands (1998–2007)
- SANAA's 21st Century Museum of Contemporary Art, Kanazawa, Japan (1999–2004)
- Isetan, Tokyo, Japan (2000)
- Lee Garden, Hong Kong, China (2000–2001)
- House in Plum Grove (2001–2003)
- Glass Pavilion of the Toledo Museum of Art, Toledo, Ohio, USA (2001–2006)
- Extension of the Institut Valencià d'Art Modern (IVAM), Valencia, Spain (2002–present)
- DIOR Tokyo Omotesando Store, Tokyo, Japan (2003)
- Bairin no le, Japan (2003)
- Zollverein School of Management and Design, Essen, Germany (2003–2006)
- Naoshima Ferry Terminal, Naoshima, Kagawa, Japan (2003–2006)
- New Museum of Contemporary Art, New York City, USA (2003–2007)
- Towada Art Center, Towada, Japan (2005–2008)
- Rolex Learning Center, École Polytechnique Fédérale de Lausanne (EPFL), Switzerland (2005–2009)
- Inujima Art House project, Okayama, Japan (began 2008)
- Serpentine Pavilion at Serpentine Galleries, London, UK (2009)
- Louvre-Lens in Lens, France (2012)
- La Samaritaine in Paris, France (2020)
- Sydney Modern (extension of the Art Gallery of New South Wales), Australia, 2022

== Bibliography ==
- GA (2005). Sejima Kazuyo + Nishizawa Ryue Dokuhon. A.D.A. Edita. ISBN 4-87140-662-8
- GA (2005). GA ARCHITECT 18 Sejima Kazuyo + Nishizawa Ryue. A.D.A. Edita. ISBN 4-87140-426-9
- Yuko Hasegawa (2005). Kazuyo Sejima + Ryue Nishizawa / SANAA, Electa. ISBN 978-88-370-3919-6
- Yuko Hasegawa (2006). Kazuyo Sejima + Ryue Nishizawa: SANAA. Phaidon Press. ISBN 978-1-904313-40-3
- Agustin Perez Rubio (2007). SANAA Houses: Kazuyo Sejima + Ryue Nishizawa. Actar. ISBN 978-84-96540-70-5
- Joseph Grima and Karen Wong (Eds) (2008) Shift: SANAA and the New Museum. Lars Müller Publishers. ISBN 978-3-03778-140-1
- Thomas Daniell (2008). After the Crash: Architecture in Post-Bubble Japan. Princeton Architectural Press. ISBN 978-1-56898-776-7

== Awards and honours ==
- 1989 – Special Prize for Residential Architecture, Tokyo Architecture Association
- 1990 – SD Prize, SD Review
- 1992 – Second Prize, Commercial Space Design Award
- 1995 – Kenneth F. Brown Asia Pacific Culture and Architecture Design Award, the University of Hawaii (for Saishunkan Seiyaku Women's Dormitory) 98oi
- 2005 – Rolf Schock Prize in Visual Arts
- 2010 – Pritzker Prize
- 2019 – Prix Versailles World Judge
- 2022 – Praemium Imperiale award for architecture
- 2024 – Person of Cultural Merit.
- 2025 – RIBA royal gold medal for architecture.

== See also ==
- Women in architecture
