= Sputniko! =

Japanese artist and designer

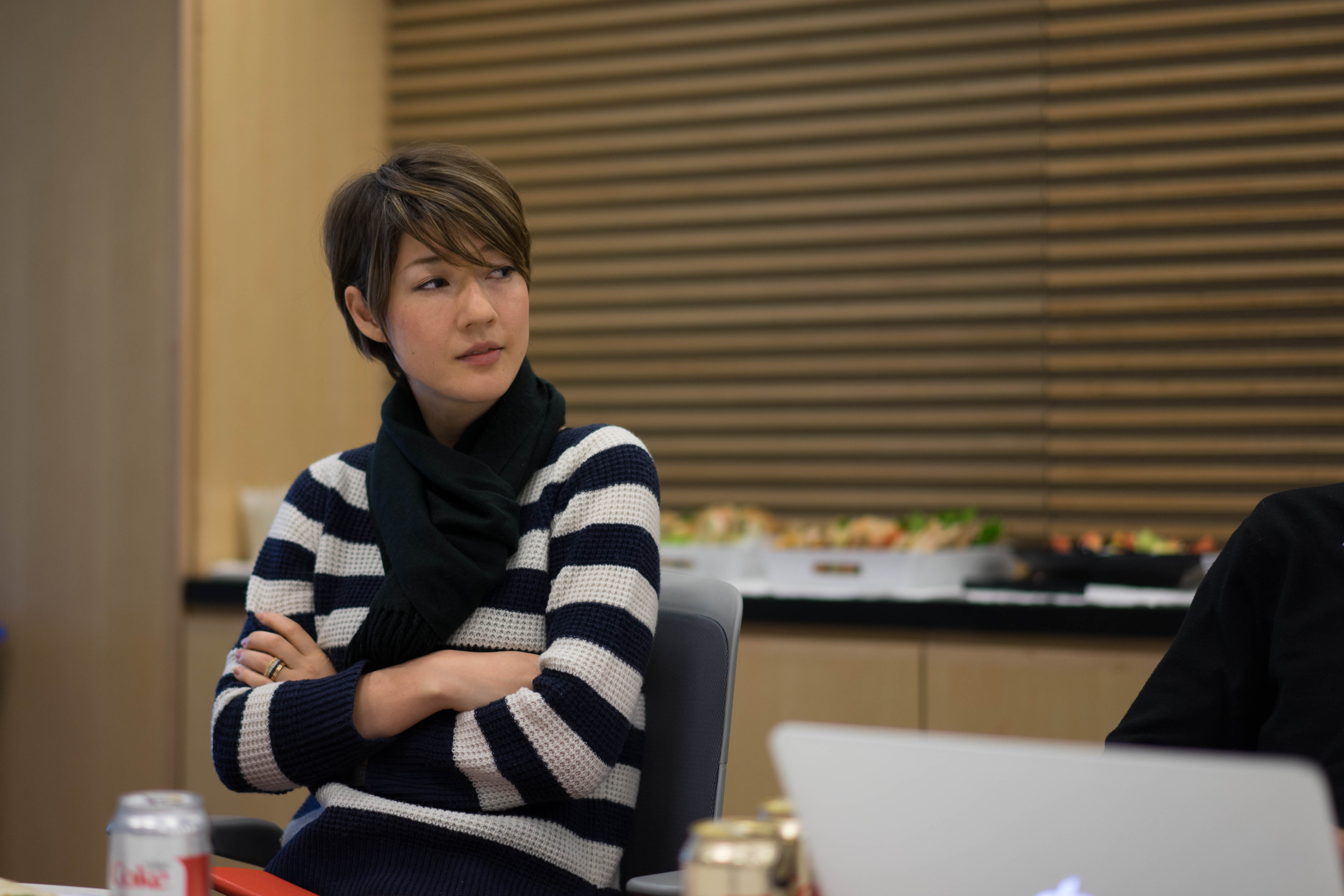
- Born: Hiromi Ozaki; Tokyo, Japan

Hiromi Marissa Ozaki (born 1 July 1985), better known by her pseudonym Sputniko!, is a Japanese artist, designer and entrepreneur. She specializes in the field of speculative and critical design. She is known for her films and multimedia installation works inspired by emerging technologies’ possible impact on society and values – with a focus on gender issues.

Her high school friends in Japan gave her the nickname “Sputnik”, from the artificial Earth satellite launched by the Soviet Union, due to her interest in science and fair skin which her friends associated with Russia. She added “Ko” (子), a character commonly used at the end of Japanese girl names, to Sputnik after learning that it was the first-ever satellite creating her now iconic pseudonym.

After majoring in BSc Mathematics and Computer Science at Imperial College, London, she pursued a master's degree in Design Interactions at the Royal College of Art.

Her art and design works have been internationally exhibited in museums such as Cooper Hewitt Design Museum (USA), Museum of Modern Art (USA), Pompidou Centre-Metz (France), ZKM Art Center (Germany), Museum of Contemporary Art Tokyo (Japan), Mori Art Museum (Japan) and Victoria & Albert Museum (UK). Her works have also been shown in numerous art festivals including Triennale di Milano (Italy), Art & Science International Exhibition (Beijing) and Setouchi Art Trienniale (Japan).

== Career ==
=== Art and Design ===
Sputniko! creates possible future scenarios and future artifacts inspired by emerging or existing technologies to promote discourse on topics such as gender, reproduction and interspecies relations. She often works with scientists to develop working prototypes of future artifacts. To convey a possible future scenario, she creates iconic music videos consisting of explanatory and narrative lyrics, pop music and films in which she often stars.

She also creates artworks with Masaya Kushino as the art duo Another Farm. Another Farm explores the relationship between humanity and nature by working with scientists and engineers to produce works that bring together new technology, traditional techniques and cultures.

As an artist and designer, she was named Vogue Japan's Women of the Year in 2013 and selected as one of Young Global Leaders in 2017 by World Economic Forum, and as one of twenty young researchers, artists and designers to become "TED Fellows in 2019.""

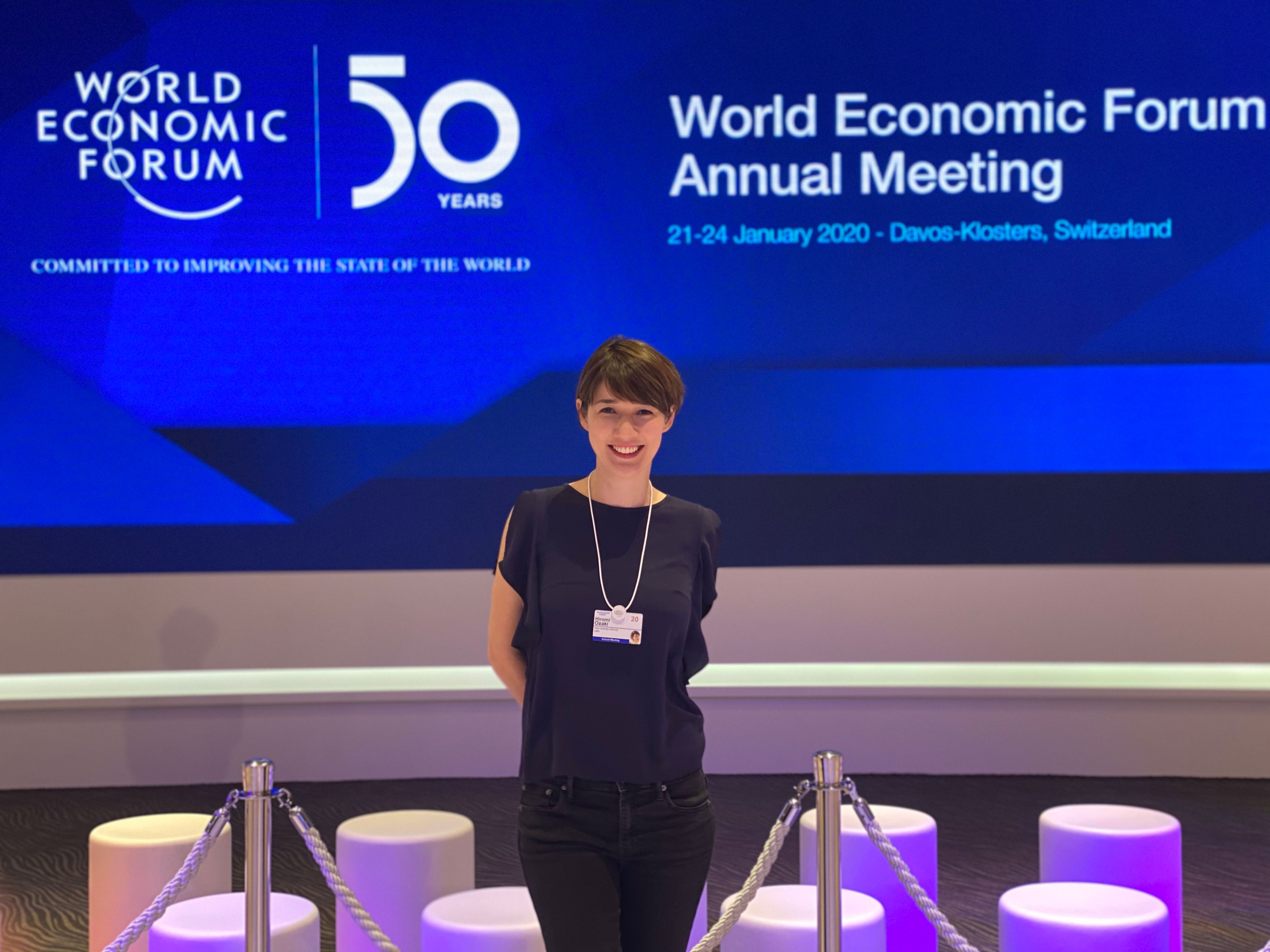
Sputniko! at World Economic Forum Annual Meeting

To date, she has had her works included in the permanent collections of museums such as the Victoria and Albert Museum (UK) and the 21st Century Museum of Contemporary Art, Kanazawa (Japan). She was nominated for the Lumen Prize 2024 and the Nam June Paik Prize 2024, recognizing her innovative contributions to art and technology. From 2016 to 2020, her works were exhibited at the Teshima 8 Million Lab on Teshima, an island of Japan.

=== Education and Research ===
From 2013 to 2017, Sputniko! was an assistant professor at the MIT Media Lab where she founded and directed the Design Fiction research group. In October 2017, She was appointed as an Associate Professor of RCA-IIS Design Lab in the Institute of Industrial Engineering at the University of Tokyo which she continued until 2019. Currently, she is an associate professor of the Department of Design at Tokyo University of the Arts.

In July 2025, at the initial 2025 Symposium on Design and Science, Chiba Institute of Technology (Chibatech) announced its first School of Design & Science, the university’s first English-language program which included Sputniko! as one of the first seven faculty members. Sputniko!'s title at SDS is Designer of Speculative Futures.

=== Entrepreneurship ===
Sputniko! founded Cradle, a women’s healthcare service that supports the well-being of female employees working in Japanese corporations.
