= Teshima 8 Million Lab =

Art project by Sputniko!

- 豊島八百万ラボ

General information
- Town or city: Teshima
- Country: Japan
- Coordinates: 34.469031135412756°N 134.07378376248903°E
- Opened: March 20, 2016

Design and construction
- Architect(s): Naruse Inokuma Architects

The Teshima 8 Million Lab (豊島八百万ラボ) was an art project created by Japanese artist Sputniko! located on Teshima, an island of Japan. Intended for the 2016 Setouchi Triennale as a convergence between mythology and science, the art project was open to the public from March 2016 to May 2020.

== History ==
In time for the 2016 Setouchi Triennale, Naruse Inokuma Architects renovated a house on Teshima into an exhibition space for Sputniko! The final design made use of traditional elements, like torii, as well as modern materials, such as steel, in order to serve as a convergence of mythology and science. Likewise, the building served both as a shrine and a laboratory. It was officially opened on March 20, 2016.

Among Sputniko!'s pieces and installations was a red thread, created from the oxytocin of silkworms and red fluorescent protein derived from coral, which had been developed in 2015 by the National Agriculture and Food Research Organization. According to a dramatic video created alongside it, the red thread was meant to symbolize the idea that science could possibly create something as abstract and intangible as love itself. The video's two love interests were named after Toyotama-hime and Yamasachi-hiko, two characters of a tragic Japanese love myth.
