= Teshima Island industrial waste case =

Environmental disaster in Japan

Coordinates: 34°28′50″N 134°02′22″E

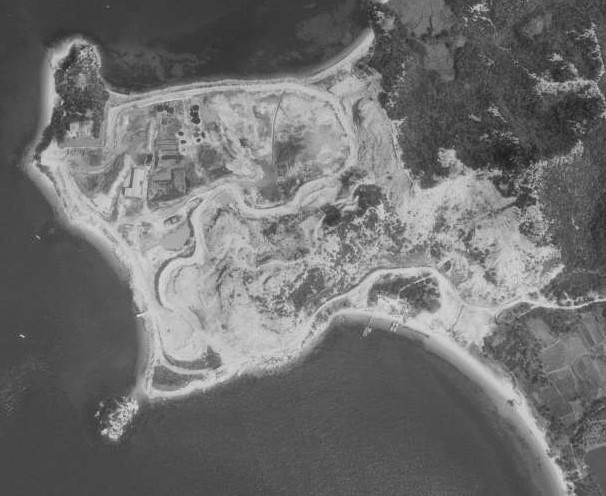
Aerial photo of the illegal dumping site on Teshima in 1983

The Teshima Island industrial waste case, sometimes called the Teshima incident or the Teshima case, was an illegal dumping case on the island of Teshima (豊島) in the Kagawa Prefecture of Japan. In a period from 1983 to November 1990, a total of about 500,000 tons of hazardous industrial waste was dumped on the western point of the island under the guise of earthworm farming and legal waste treatment. The incident was one of the worst environmental disasters in Japanese history.

== Pre-dumping (1975–1978) ==
On December 18, 1975, Teshima Sogo Kanko Kaihatu (translating to Teshima Integrated Tourism Development) Co., Ltd., a company primarily controlled by Sousuke Matsuura and his wife, Kiyoko Matsuura, applied for permission to construct a hazardous waste disposal site on Teshima. Soon after, in February of 1976, residents of the island protested against the construction through a petition with 1,425 signatures. Part of this backlash came from the island being in the Setonaikai National Park, one of the first designated Japanese national parks, encompassing much of the Seto Inland Sea. The petition was presented to the then governor of Kagawa, Tadao Maekawa (前川忠夫). One year later, in February of 1976, residence continued their protest through the formation of the "Teshima Residents Council for Absolutely Refusing Industrial Waste". This council included most of the local residents. In March of the same year, Governor Maekawa revealed a policy that would allow for the waste disposal site. In response, 515 Teshima residents hosted a rally and chartered a ferry to the port of Takamatsu. The protestors then marched to the Kagawa prefecture office in the city. In June, the residents continued their protest by filing an injunction lawsuit in the Takamatsu District Court to halt the construction of the site.

In February of 1978, the Kagawa prefecture granted operator permission of the site under the pretext of soil improvement through earthworm farming for fertilizer production. The site was legally limited to only treating sludge and wood waste from paper production. The site would later get permission to dispose of metal waste in January of 1983. In October of 1978, the residents of Teshima and the operators of the site reached a settlement. As a part of the settlement to Kagawa prefecture guaranteed to monitor the site for illegal activity.

== Illegal dumping (1983–1990) ==
From 1983 to 1990, Teshima Sogo Kanko Kaihatu Co., Ltd. illegally shipped in waste, including oil, plastics, paper, metal scraps, gypsum board, slag and mineral waste, paint, volatile organic solvents, and paper mill sludge. While the site originally followed the approved permitting for fertilizer production through worm farming, this was quickly abandoned due to poor revenue. Waste came from both urban and industrial sources. One prominent source was automotive waste, which due to its difficulty to properly dispose of, was often dumped in locations with small populations, such as Teshima. This waste was then burned on the site. During this period, residents of the island complained of asthma-like conditions and burning eyes, leading to many wearing masks. The dumping site led to Teshima being nicknamed the "garbage island" by the surrounding area. This designation hurt agriculture and seafood exports from the island, both economically important for local residents.

In November of 1990, police officers from the neighboring Hyogo prefecture conducted a compulsory investigation of the site under suspicion of noncompliance with the Waste Disposal Law. The Hyogo Police was able to do a raid in Kagawa Prefecture because some of the waste at the Teshima site originated from Hyogo Prefecture and the Kagawa Police showed no signs of intervening. This investigation officially revealed the illegal hazardous dumping taking place on the site, leading the Kagawa Prefecture to revoking the operation license of the site.

== Aftermath and remediation (1991–present) ==
=== Arrest ===
In January 1991, the Hyogo Prefectural Police Office arrested Sousuke Matsuura for his illegal operations on Teshima violating the Industrial Waste Disposal Law. In July of that year, the Himeji Branch of the Kobe District Court sentenced Matsuura to 10 months of imprisonment with a five-year suspended sentence. Only once the trial records of the case were released in April 1993 did Teshima residents understand the operations conducted on the island by Matsuura.

=== Lead up to remediation ===
In November of 1993, residents of the island applied for a pollution conciliation to the Environmental Dispute Coordination Commission. In December of the next year, the commission decided to conduct a factual investigation of the waste site. This pollution conciliation was concluded in June of 2000, but was not the only thing that allowed for removal of the waste. In December of 1993, the Kagawa government declared the site to be safe after Teshima Sogo Kanko Kaihatu Co., Ltd. removed only 1,340 tons of waste. Just before this declaration, Teshima residents started standing demonstrations in front of the Kagawa prefectural office. These demonstrations ended in May of 1995. During the same month expert advisors issued a report disagreeing with the prefecture's safety decoration. In February of 1996, 245 residents filed a lawsuit against Sousuke Matsuura for the removal of the waste and claims for damages. Later that summer, the Ministry of Health, Labour and Welfare criticized the Kagawa prefecture for their handling of the dumping and inspected the site. The findings of this inspection continued to disagree with the prior declaration of safety. In continued protest, that September, residents from the island took waste from the site to Ginza, Tokyo. Two wins for the residents came later that year when Prime Minister Ryutaro Hashimoto announced governmental financial support for the island and the residents won their case against Sousuke Matsuura. The final major protest held by the residents took place July of 1997 when a campaign was started that distributed flyers to all 6,000 households in the Town of Tonosho on the neighboring island of Shodoshima. After the formation of a Technical Review Committee and roundtable discussions across 100 parts of Kagawa, the Waste Disposal Council and other groups were formed for the cleanup of the waste site.

Dumping site in June, 2025

=== Remediation ===
In July of 2001, underground water-insulating walls were installed around the dump site to prevent further outflow of toxic wastewater through groundwater flow. The groundwater included dangerously high concentrations of benzene, cadmium, lead, mercury, arsenic and other toxic chemicals. These walls proved to be successful with the subsequent restoration of eelgrass beds in the tidal flats of the surrounding area as well as the return of marine animals.

In May of 2003, the Kagawa Prefecture started the removal of waste from the site. Waste from the site was shipped by container ships to the neighboring island of Naoshima, where a waste incinerator and waste processing center operated by Mitsubishi Materials was built for the main purpose of dealing with the waste from Teshima. Naoshima was chosen as the treatment location for its proximity to Teshima and the island's Eco-Island Naoshima plan. This project shifted Naoshima to a recycling-based society and increased ecotourism. The incinerator was a surface melting rotary furnace that could handle up to 200 tons/day of waste. The waste treatment facility included multiple processes meant to recycle the materials. Metals, such as copper, iron, and aluminum, where extracted to be melted and transformed into slag that was used as aggregate in concreate. Steam produced from the incinerator was harnessed for the use of energy production. Waste removal ended in July of 2019 with the removal of a total of 600,000 tons going to the Naoshima processing plant. In March of 2022, removal of the water-insulating walls was completed, reconnecting the area to the outside sea.

As of 2023, the plan for the site is to continue monitoring the groundwater from the site until it reaches contamination levels that are safe to drink. Once this point is reached, the area will be returned to the residents of the island and will be turned into a natural beach. Currently, the site contains the Teshima Island School, a faculty that acts as a museum of incident-related items and education center for talks about the Teshima case. The school also runs workshops on environmental management.

== Setouchi Triennale ==
As a way to try to shed the stigma of Teshima as the "garbage island" and revitalize the area, in 2010 the island joined the Setouchi Triennale, an art festival spread across several of the surrounding islands and the cities of Takamatsu and Tamano. Part of the art festival is the Teshima Art Museum which was designed by Ryue Nishizawa featuring Rei Naito's structure titled Matrix. These efforts have been considered successful as they have increased the tourism and helped destigmatize the island. Teshima has had the second highest number of visitors during years of the festival.

== Impacts on waste regulation ==
The events of the Teshima incident had great influence not only within the surrounding Seto Inland Sea area, but also across Japan. The Act on Waste Management and Public Cleansing was revised in connection to the event. The dumping was in part able to happen because of weaknesses in this law. Revisions included increasing the fine for illegal dumping 3 million yen to 300 million yen and adding conditions for revoking the permission of waste disposal businesses. The dumping also helped lead to the creation of the Basic Law for Establishing the Recycling-based Society in 2000. This law established the basic regulations and standards for recycling across Japan.

One of the most significant aspects of the waste case were the protests lead by the locals of Teshima. The public attention gained by these protests and the subsequent success of them helped to establish community environmental actions across Japan.
