= Teshima Yokoo House =

Art museum in Teshima, Japan

- 豊島横尾館
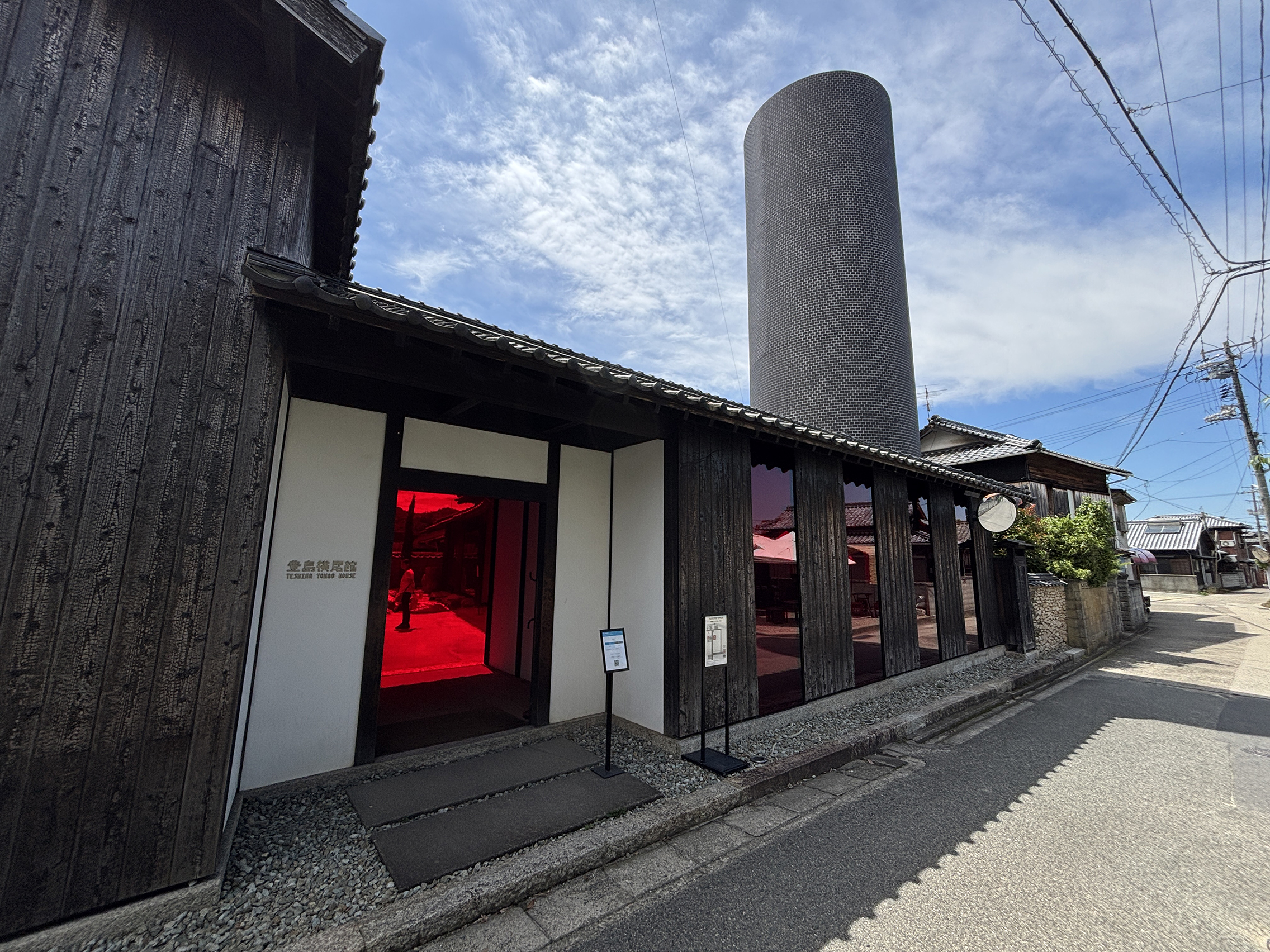
- Silo of the Teshima Yokoo House
- Interactive map of the Teshima Yokoo House area

General information
- Location: Teshima, Japan
- Coordinates: 34.4870092874451°N 134.05959803170023°E
- Opened: July 2013

Design and construction
- Architect: Yuko Nagayama

The Teshima Yokoo House (豊島横尾館) is an art museum on Teshima, an island of Japan, designed by Japanese architect Yuko Nagayama in anticipation of the 2013 Setouchi Triennale. Involving a renovation of several old houses in Teshima's Ieura district, the Teshima Yokoo House showcases an exhibition of work by its namesake, the Japanese artist Tadanori Yokoo. Meant to evoke the simultaneity of life and death, much like Yokoo's themes in his own work, it was named one of Japan's best museums by Casa Brutus.

== Design ==
The Teshima Yokoo House was a collaboration between Yokoo and Nagayama. Nagayama designed the Teshima Yokoo House, in line with Yokoo's concepts, and built it by renovating and expanding three houses in the Ieura district of Teshima; said houses were believed to be nearly a century old. Faithful to the layout of the old houses it was renovated from, the Teshima Yokoo House has a main house, a storehouse, and a cylindrical tower, as well as an outdoor pond and garden. 11 of Yokoo's works are displayed all throughout the premises, including work specifically made for the building.

Rather than simply create a space where artworks could be shown, Nagayama intended to create a building where three-dimensional architecture and two-dimensional artwork interfaced with one another. As such, Nagayama installed colored glass in certain windows of the building in order to use the building itself to alter the viewing experience of any given piece of artwork on the other side vis-à-vis light and color.

In line with its theme of simultaneous life and death, the space also serves as a venue for funerals, in addition to a "cultural center that the citizens could frequent for a range of purposes."

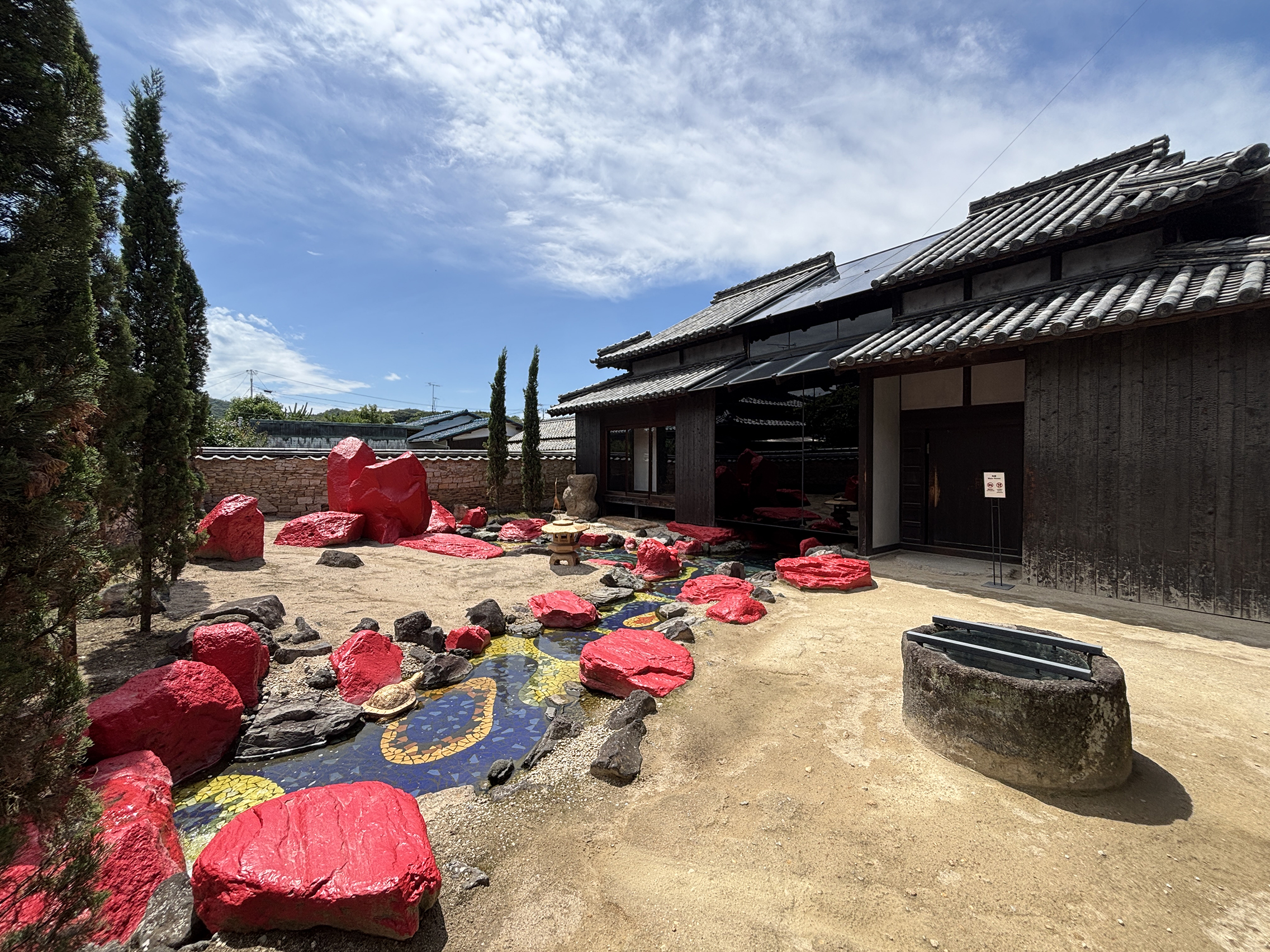
Courtyard

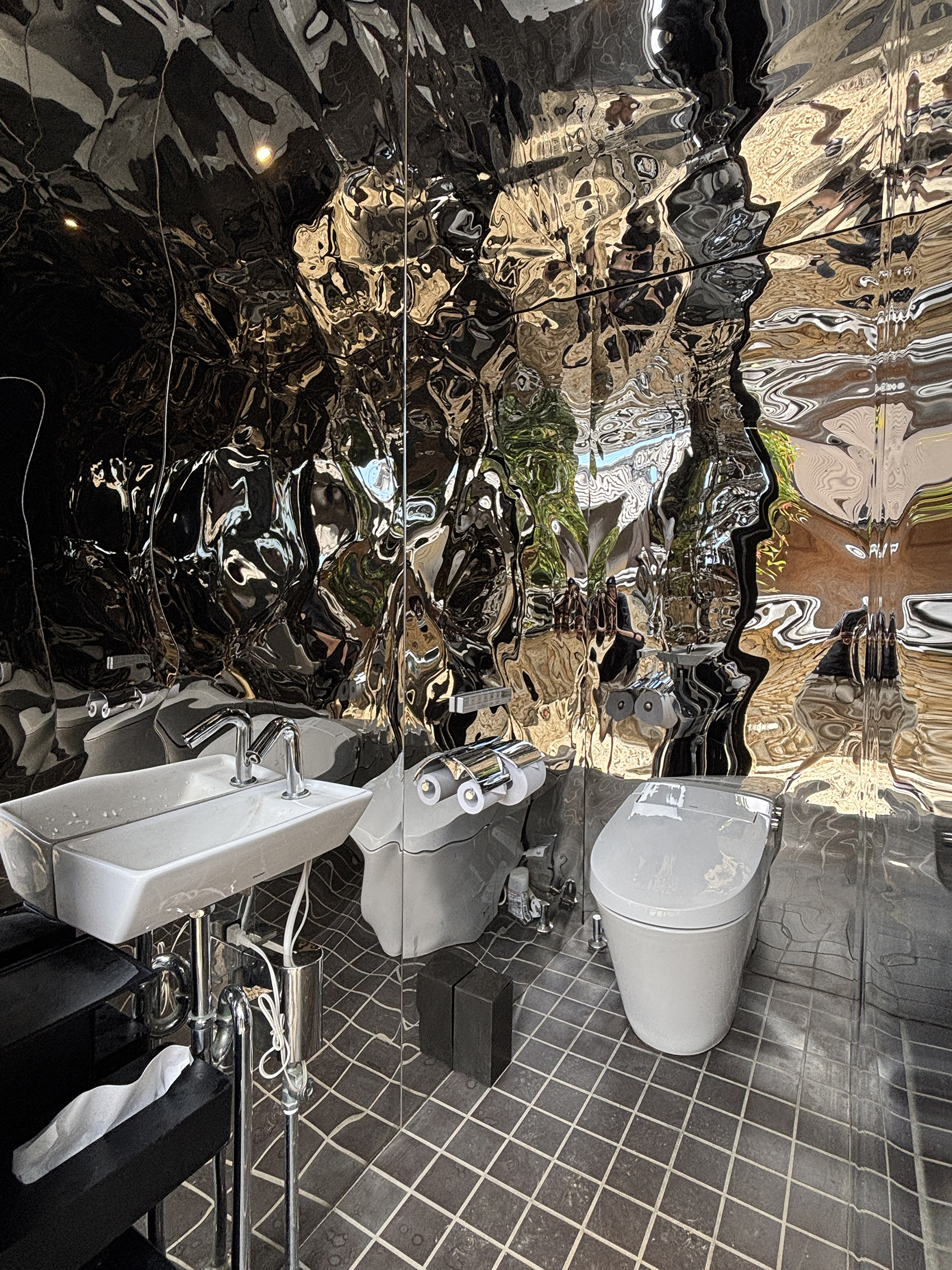
Washroom

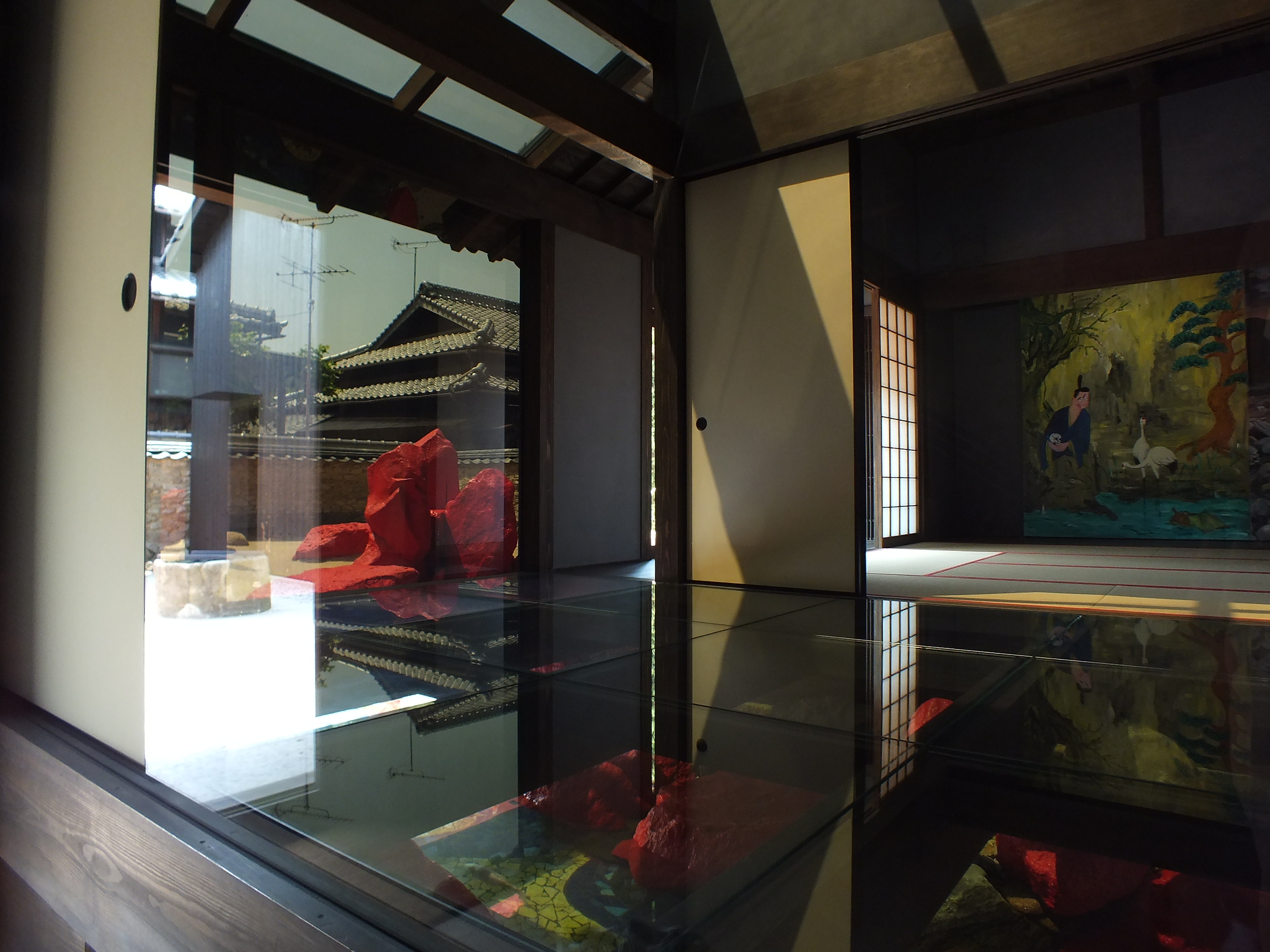
Museum inside

== History ==
During the construction of the Teshima Yokoo House, Yokoo wanted the process to be transparent with the locals of Teshima. As such, rice cake–making events were held to propagate information about the building ahead of its completion, and attendees at the Setouchi Triennale could view ongoing construction through some of its windows. Some Teshima residents took part in furnishing the Teshima Yokoo House's garden by making tile paintings now laid at the bottom of its pond. Before the museum's official opening, around 30% of Teshima's population was able to see the art museum in full through a preview showing.

The museum officially opened in July 2013, during the Setouchi Triennale.
