= Ieura Hachiman Shrine =

Shinto shrine in Teshima, Japan

- 家浦八幡神社

Religion
- Affiliation: Shinto
- District: Shozu District
- Prefecture: Kagawa
- Deity: Hachiman

Location
- Location: 2850 Teshimaieura, Tonosho, Shozu District, Kagawa 761-4661, Japan
- Municipality: Teshima
- Country: Japan
- Interactive map of Ieura Hachiman Shrine
- Prefecture: Kagawa
- Coordinates: 34.48626°N 134.05601°E

Ieura Hachiman Shrine (家浦八幡神社, Ieura hachiman jinja) is a Shinto shrine in Teshima, Kagawa Prefecture, Japan. As a Hachiman shrine, the shrine is dedicated to the kami Hachiman. Hachiman is one of the most widely enshrined kami in Japan; about 2,500 shrines are dedicated to him, second in number only to those of Inari Ōkami. The entrance to the shrine is marked with a large stone torii gate made of Teshima stone, a tuff breccia quarried in Teshima. The gate is the oldest stone torii in the Kagawa Prefecture, built in 1474. The shrine is about a 15-minute walk from Ieura port. Teshima is an island of 14.5 square kilometres with a population of about 700.

== History ==
Teshima was an estate of Kōfuku-ji temple in the Muromachi period. The shrine's stone torii was built in 1474, dated by an inscription on its left post. The torii has survived five Nankai earthquakes in 1498, 1605, 1707, 1854 and 1946 and the 1596 Keicho-Fushimi earthquake, although it is possible that it collapsed and was rebuilt or repaired at some point.

== Stone torii ==
The shrine's torii is made of Teshima stone, a dark grey Miocene volcanic lapilli tuff, also called tuff breccia. Its posts are 39 centimetres in diameter and it is over 4 metres tall. The left post bears an inscription with the date 1474, and the right post bears the name and title of a construction inspector. It is said to be the oldest stone torii in Kagawa Prefecture. The torii is a tangible cultural property of Kagawa Prefecture, designated on 9 April 1963. It is listed as one of the sites of the Japan Heritage story of the Stone Islands, which the Agency for Cultural Affairs certified on 20 May 2019.

== Festival ==
The shrine's annual festival is held on 17 and 18 October. It is a harvest thanksgiving festival said to have a history of several hundred years. A taiko-dai, a drum float weighing about 1 tonne, is carried by about 30 bearers who lift it high while the Ise Ondo is sung, with three children beating drums inside it. The three settlements of Ieura district bring three taiko-dai, large, medium and small, and a small danjiri, processing about 700 metres from the shrine to Teshima Elementary School and back. The festival was cancelled from 2020 to 2022 because of the COVID-19 pandemic and resumed in 2023, with the number of bearers decreasing as the island's population declines.
