= Yuko Nagayama =

Japanese architect (born 1975)

- 永山祐子
- Born: 1975 (age 50–51); Tokyo, Japan
- Occupation: Architect
- Organization(s): Yuko Nagayama & Associates
- Website: https://www.yukonagayama.co.jp/en/

Yuko Nagayama (永山祐子, born 1975) is a Japanese architect and a visiting professor at the Musashino Art University. As a Tokyo native, she worked at Jun Aoki & Associates from 1998 to 2002 and subsequently started her own architecture studio, Yuko Nagayama & Associates. She designed the Tokyu Kabukicho Tower at the heart of Tokyo, and is one of the architects of Torch Tower, which is expected to be the tallest building in Japan by 2027.

Nagayama received numerous awards, including the JCD designer award 2018, the Tokyo award 2018, and the iF Design Award 2023.

== Early life and education ==
Yuko Nagayama was born in Tokyo in 1975. Due to her father's (Kuniaki Nagayama's) profession as a physicist and biophysics researcher, she spent her early childhood in Switzerland. She returned to Japan at the age of 3 and grew up in Asagaya, Suginami Ward, Tokyo. Nagayama attended school at the Kyoritsu Women's Second Middle and High School.

In 1994, Nagyama was admitted to the Department of Human Life and Science at Showa Women's University. Upon graduating in 1998 with a Bachelor of Arts and gaining a second-class architect qualification, Nagayama joined the architecture studio of Jun Aoki. It was common for employees at Jun Aoki & Associates to undergo a 4-year tenure period, allowing the firm to benefit from a continuous infusion of fresh talent and new ideas. Nagayama left in 2002 with the intention of pursuing further studies to acquire a first-class architect license.

However, a turning point came when Aoki presented her with an opportunity to design the interior of a salon in Tokyo's Omotesando district. This project marked Nagayama's first commission.

== Career ==
Nagayama started her studio at the age of 26, despite disapproval and concerns from her former boss regarding her young age. However, Aoki eventually extended his support and helped secure her first commission, titled Afloat-f. This project launched Nagayama's career and opened the doors to numerous other commissions for her firm. She gained recognition through works such as the Louis Vuitton Kyoto Daimaru Store (Kyoto, 2004) and A Hill on a House (Tokyo, 2006), and was only able to take time off work for her licensing exam after 3 years.

Yuko Nagayama is married to Japanese artist Akira Fujimoto, and they have two children. As of 2012, she managed a four-person firm from two apartments located in adjacent residential buildings on the western edge of Tokyo. The arrangement allowed her to balance her roles as a mother and an architect. In one apartment, she could work independently whilst taking care of her firstborn, and the other served as a small meeting room that doubled as a conference space. She relied on technology, such as Skype, to access building sites virtually and relay information. This approach enabled multitasking and managing responsibilities in the office and in the family.

Today, the firm employs 15 people and is headquartered in Shinjuku, Tokyo. The most notable projects are Goddess of the Forest Central Garden (Yamanashi, 2016), the Japan Pavilion at Expo 2020 Dubai (Dubai, 2021), Jins Park Maebashi Store (Gunma, 2021) and the Tokyo Kabukicho Tower (Tokyo, 2023).

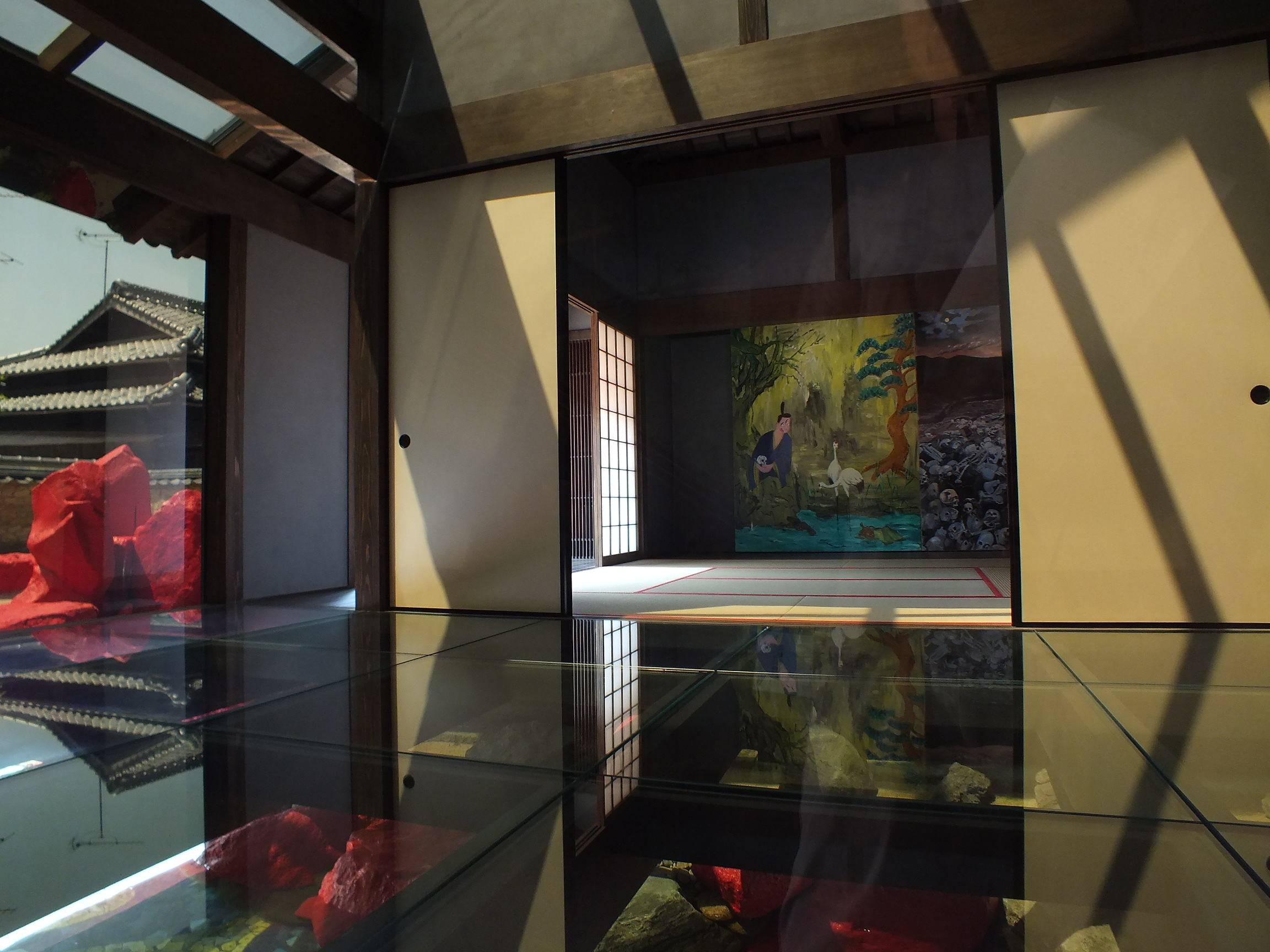
Interior of Teshima Yokoo House

In addition to the firm's focus on commercial projects, Yuko Nagayama and her team engages in local renewal and art initiatives. She collaborated with artist Tadanori Yokoo to renovate a traditional Japanese house (minka) into a museum known as Teshima Yokoo House in 2013. The scheme aimed to revitalise the small port of Ieura on the island of Teshima in the Seto Inland Sea. In the same year, she and her husband initiated a month-long art event "At Art Uwajima" in Uwajima City, Ehime Prefecture. During this event, a total of 7 artists showcased installations and artworks in Nagayama's Kiya Ryokan (Ehime, 2012) and the city's shopping arcade. Nagayama continues to explore the potential of art in transforming the built environment with other creators.

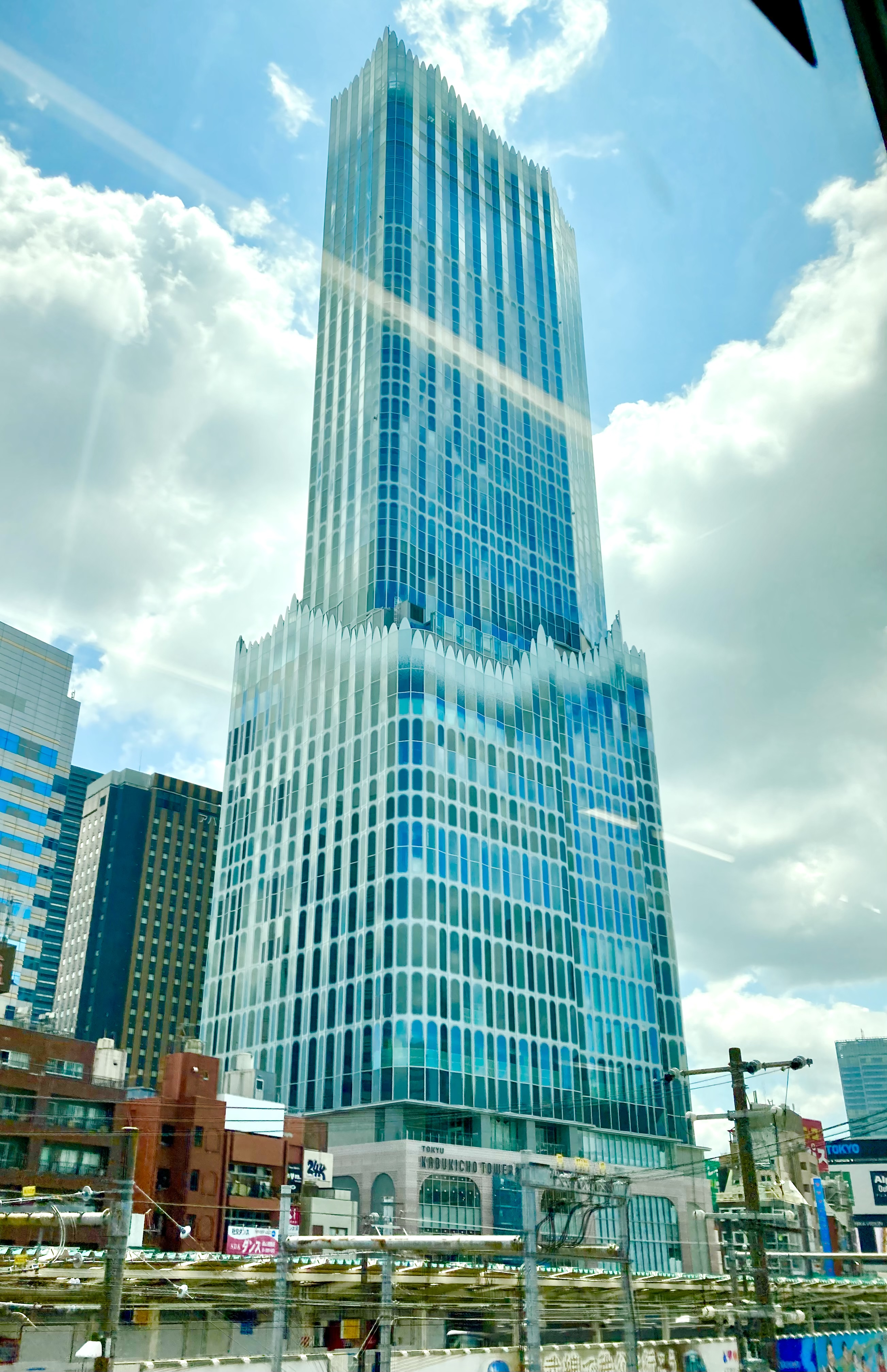
Tokyo Kabukicho Tower

In addition, Nagayama also lectures at Kyoto Seika University, Showa Women's University, Ochanomizu University and Nagoya Institute of Technology. She is now a visiting professor at the Musashino Art University.

== Design ethos ==
The theme of 'phenomena' is a prominent feature in Nagayama's architectural works. She considers architecture to be more creating an experience in people's mind than constructing a physical building. Instead of focusing on objects, she interprets and shapes space with intangible elements. A key concept she incorporates into her designs is the Japanese notion of 'Ma (間),' which refers to voids and empty spaces. In Nagayama's architecture, 'Ma' is translated into various forms, such as reflections, the quality of light, or even a gentle breeze of wind. By integrating these natural phenomena into her designs, her spaces take on a dynamic and non-static character. Her practice is described by architect Ruairí O'Brien as using "what is there to achieve what is not there by exploiting the spaces between, filling the gaps and using the "leftovers" in inclusive and people-oriented ways."

This dynamism in Nagayama's work is closely related to a sense of ambiguity that is also a prominent feature in her projects. For Nagayama, ambiguity (曖昧さ) – present in different aspects of Japanese culture and in the Japanese language – is something to be enjoyed, whether in terms of the color, material, or shape of the built environment. It can even be materialized through her architecture's relationship with nature, as with the ephemeral nature of light, wind, or even the seasons.

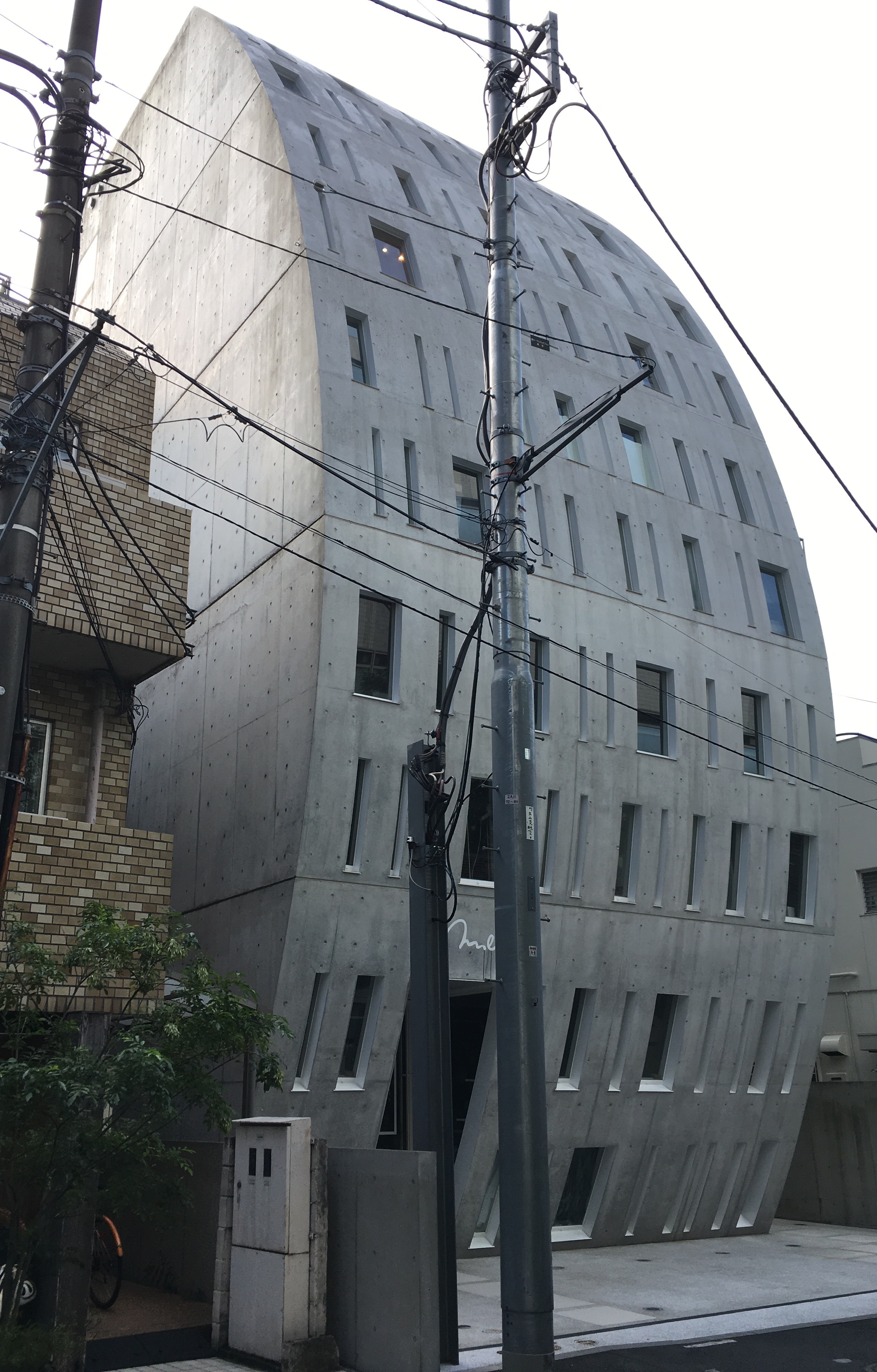
URBANPREM Minami Aoyama

== Selected works ==
- Tokyo Kabukicho Tower (2023)
- Sea Hammock (2023)
- Hokuto Art Program ed.1 (2021)
- JINS PARK Maebashi Shop (2021)
- Dubai Expo 2020 Japan Pavilion (2019–2021)
- Suginami House (2017)
- Goddness of the Forest Central Garden (2016)
- Teshima Yokoo House (2013)
- Kiya Ryokan (2012)
- URBANPREM Minami Aoyama (2008)
- AZUMAYA (2007)
- Louis Vuitton Daimaru Kyoto Store (2004)

== Future projects ==
Yoko Nagayama's upcoming projects include 2 pavilions for the 2025 Osaka Expo: Panasonic Group Pavilion 'Nomo no Kuni' and 'Woman's Pavilion' with Cartier. She is also involved in designing the lower part of the new icon Torch Tower for Tokyo, a large-scale redevelopment of 3.1 hectares located next to Tokyo Station.

== Awards ==
- 2004 "Nakanoshima New Line Design Competition," Prize for Excellence
- 2005 L;Oreal Color "science and arts Award" Encouragement Prize
- 2005 "Conceptual Home for 'Tsukuba Denentoshi' Competition," 2nd Place
- 2005 "JCD Design Award 2005," Encouragement Prize with Louis Vuitton Kyoto Daimaru
- 2006 "AR Awards (UK)," Highly Commended with a hill on a house (organized by The Architectural Review, UK)
- 2010 "Taya Renewal Competition 2010," Honorable Mention
- 2010 Kyoai Gakuen University, wing 4 design proposal, Honorable Mention
- 2012 Architectural Record Award (US), Design Vanguard 2012
- 2014 "JIA Young Architect Award 2014" with Teshima Yokoo House
- 2017 "Yamanashi Cultural Prize of Architecture" with Goddess of the Forest Central Garden
- 2017 "JCD Design Award," Silver Award with Goddess of the Forest Central Garden 2018
- 2018 "Tokyo Architecture Award 2018," Prize for Excellence with Goddess of the Forest Central Garden
- 2021 "Design Award for Light and Lighting," Grand Prize for Excellence with Tamagawa Takashimaya S.C. Grand Patio
- 2022 World Architecture Festival 2022 Highly Commended「Jins Park Maebashi
- 2023 iF Design Award 2023 Winner「Jins Park Maebashi
