= Teshima =

Island of Japan

Coordinates: 34°28′53″N 134°4′38″E

豊島
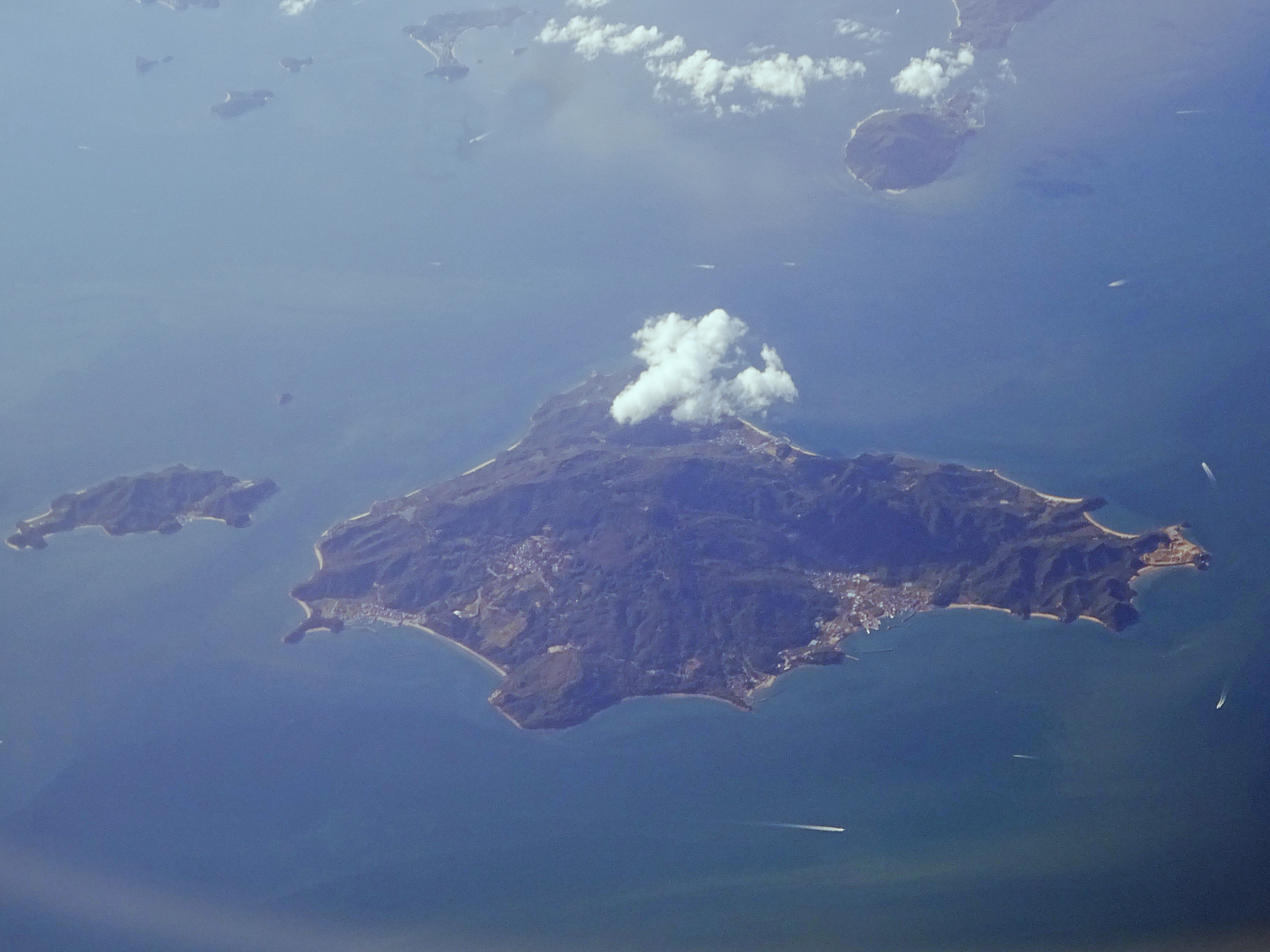
- Aerial view of the island in 2022
- Interactive map of Teshima

Geography
- Location: Seto Inland Sea, Japan
- Area: 14.5 km^{2} (5.6 sq mi)
- Coastline: 19.8 km (12.3 mi)

Administration
- Japan
- Prefecture: Kagawa Prefecture
- District: Shōzu District

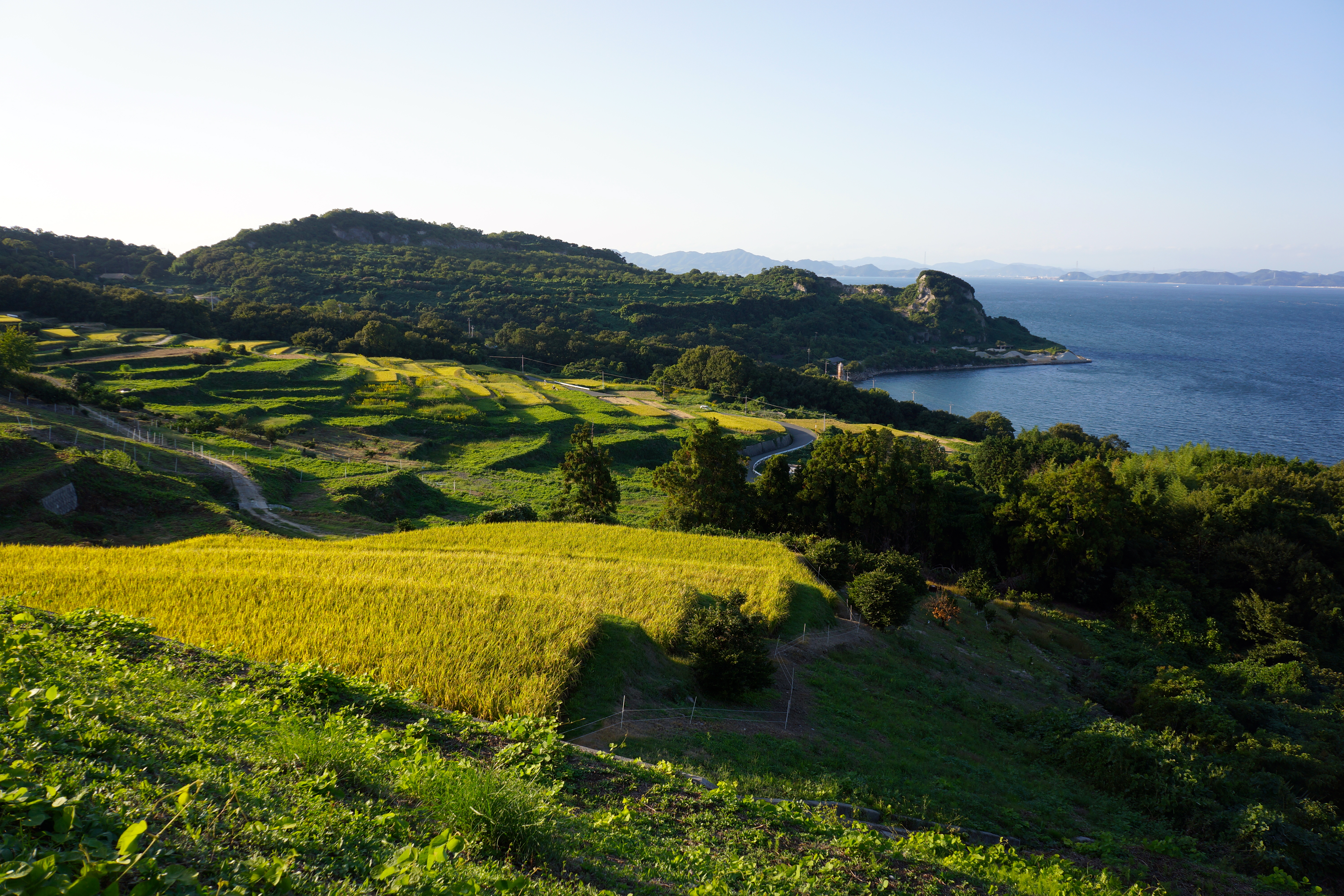
Agricultural fields on Teshima

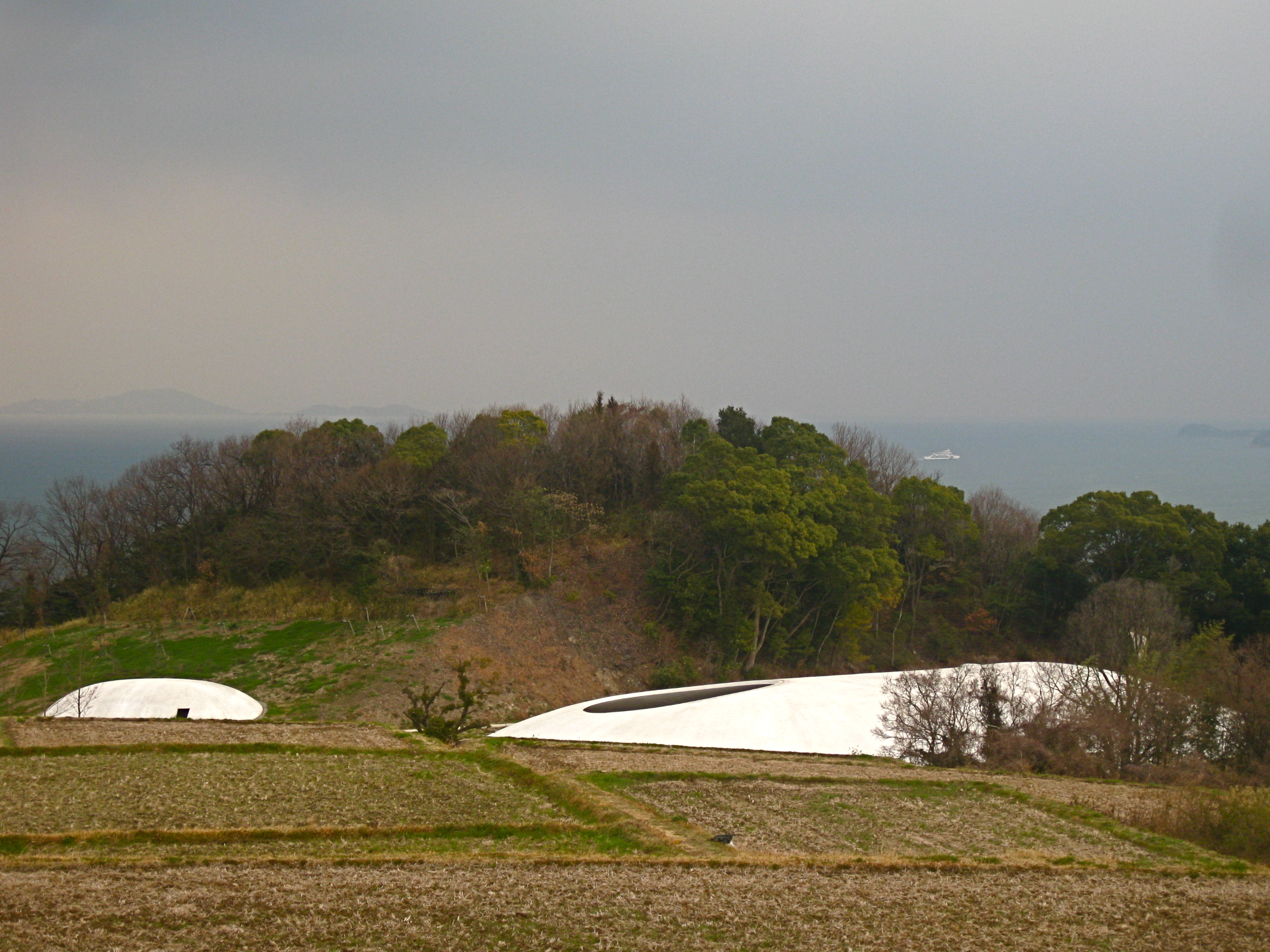
Teshima Art Museum

Teshima (豊島) is an island located in the inland sea of Japan, between Naoshima and Shōdoshima islands, and is part of Kagawa Prefecture. It has an area of 14.5 square kilometres (5.6 square miles) and a population of about 1,000 people.

== History ==
Teshima has been inhabited for 14,000 years.

The island was the subject of a scandal in which 600,000 tons of toxic waste were illegally dumped on the island. In 2000, after a 25-year legal battle, the waste was transported to Naoshima for processing.

== Tourism ==
Teshima is one of the locations of the Setouchi Triennale, also known as the Setouchi International Art Festival, a triennial art festival dispersed across islands in the Seto Inland Sea.

The Teshima Art Museum opened on the island in 2010. The museum contains only a single piece of artwork named Matrix, a concreate building designed by architect Ryue Nishizawa with a water feature designed by Rei Naito.

The Teshima Yokoo House is an art museum designed by architect Yuko Nagayama by renovating a house in the Ieura District. The museum contains works by artist Tadanori Yokoo inside. The project was created for the 2013 Setouchi Triennale.

Next to Ieura port is Ieura Hachiman Shrine, a Shinto shrine dedicated to the kami Hachiman and with the oldest stone torii gate in the prefecture.
