= Choi Jeong Hwa =

South Korean artist and designer

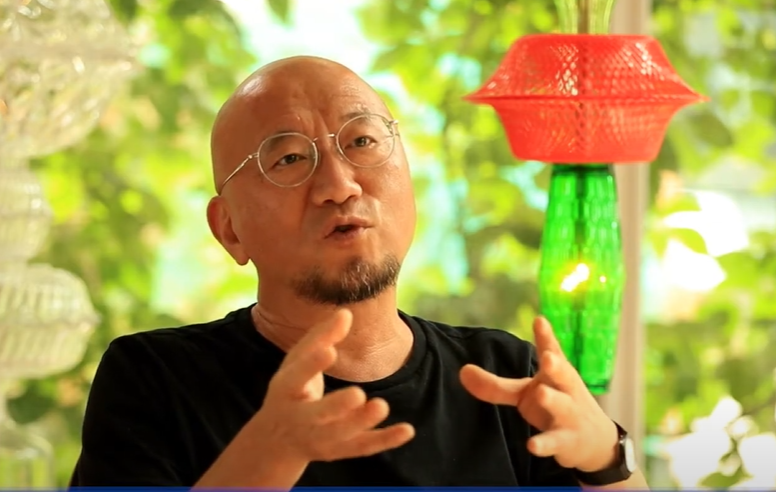
- Choi Jeonghwa in 2020
- Born: 1961 (age 64–65); Seoul, South Korea
- Education: Hongik University
- Known for: Installation art, public art
- Website: choijeonghwa.kr

Choi Jeonghwa (Korean: 최정화; born 1961) is a South Korean artist and designer. His work includes large-scale installations and public art that frequently incorporate everyday materials, consumer goods, and recycled objects. He has worked in visual art, graphic and industrial design, and architecture.

== Early life and education ==
Choi was born in Seoul in 1961. His father was a soldier. Choi began drawing during his last year of high school and went on to major in painting at Hongik University.

== Career ==
Choi's work blurs the lines between fine art, design, and commercial projects. In the 1990s, he designed and directed several multi-purpose cultural spaces in Seoul, including "Olo Olo" (1990), "Space Ozone" (1991), and "Salba" (1996), which combined elements of food, music, exhibitions, and performance. He also served as the creative director for the fashion brand SSAMZIE from 1997 to 2008.

His large-scale installations often use mass-produced or discarded items. A notable work, "Alchemy", was an installation in the main hall of the Leeum, Samsung Museum of Art. He has created public art projects internationally, including "Breathing Flower" for the Annecy Paysages festival in France and "Come Together", a collection of commemorative sculptures for the 2022 FIFA World Cup in Qatar.

Choi has also worked as an artistic director for large-scale events. He was the artistic director for the opening and closing ceremonies of the 2018 Winter Paralympics in Pyeongchang. In 2023, he directed "Tiger, Journey, Love", a month-long festival of Korean contemporary arts at The Coronet Theatre in London. He has also directed stage designs for the National Theater of Korea and the alternative pop band Leenalchi.

His practice includes architectural and environmental design projects, such as the VEKE Garden in Jeju and the Namhae Dolchanggo Project, which focuses on ecological design. He has collaborated with commercial brands on art projects, including Bulgari, Dior, Fendi, and Nespresso.

Choi has been involved in art education programs for children and adults. In 2024, he participated in "Neulbom Arts School", a government-supported initiative by The National Education Promotion Service and the EBS to develop online arts education content.

== Selected exhibitions ==
Choi has exhibited his work in numerous international biennales, triennales, and museum shows.

Biennales and Triennales

- Venice Biennale, Korean Pavilion (2005) The original article text stated 2004, but the 51st Venice Biennale was in 2005. This should be verified with a reliable source.
- Setouchi Triennale, Shodoshima, Japan (2013)
- Fukuoka Asian Art Triennale, Fukuoka, Japan (2014)
- Saitama Triennale, Saitama, Japan (2016)
- Honolulu Biennial, Honolulu, USA (2017)
- Bangkok Art Biennale, Bangkok, Thailand (2018)

Solo and Group Exhibitions

- Festival of the World, Hayward Gallery, London, UK (2012)
- Choi Jeong Hwa - Natural Color, Culture Station Seoul 284, Seoul, Korea (2014)
- Happy Together, Kiasma, Helsinki, Finland (2016)
- MMCA Hyundai Motor Series 2018: Choi Jeonghwa – Blooming Matrix, National Museum of Modern and Contemporary Art, Seoul, Korea (2018)
- 生生活活 (Seng-Seng-Hwal-Hwal), Kirishima Open-Air Museum, Kagoshima, Japan (2022)

== Awards ==
- Second Prize, JoongAng Fine Arts Prize (1986)
- Grand Prize, JoongAng Fine Arts Prize (1987)
- Total Fine Art Prize (1997)
- Ilmin Arts Award, Ilmin Cultural Foundation (2005)
- Korea Artist Prize, National Museum of Modern and Contemporary Art (2006)
- The EBS President Award (2023)
- Minister Prize, Ministry of Culture, Sports and Tourism (2023)
