= Rei Naito =

Japanese artist (born 1961)

- Born: 1961 (age 64–65); Hiroshima, Japan

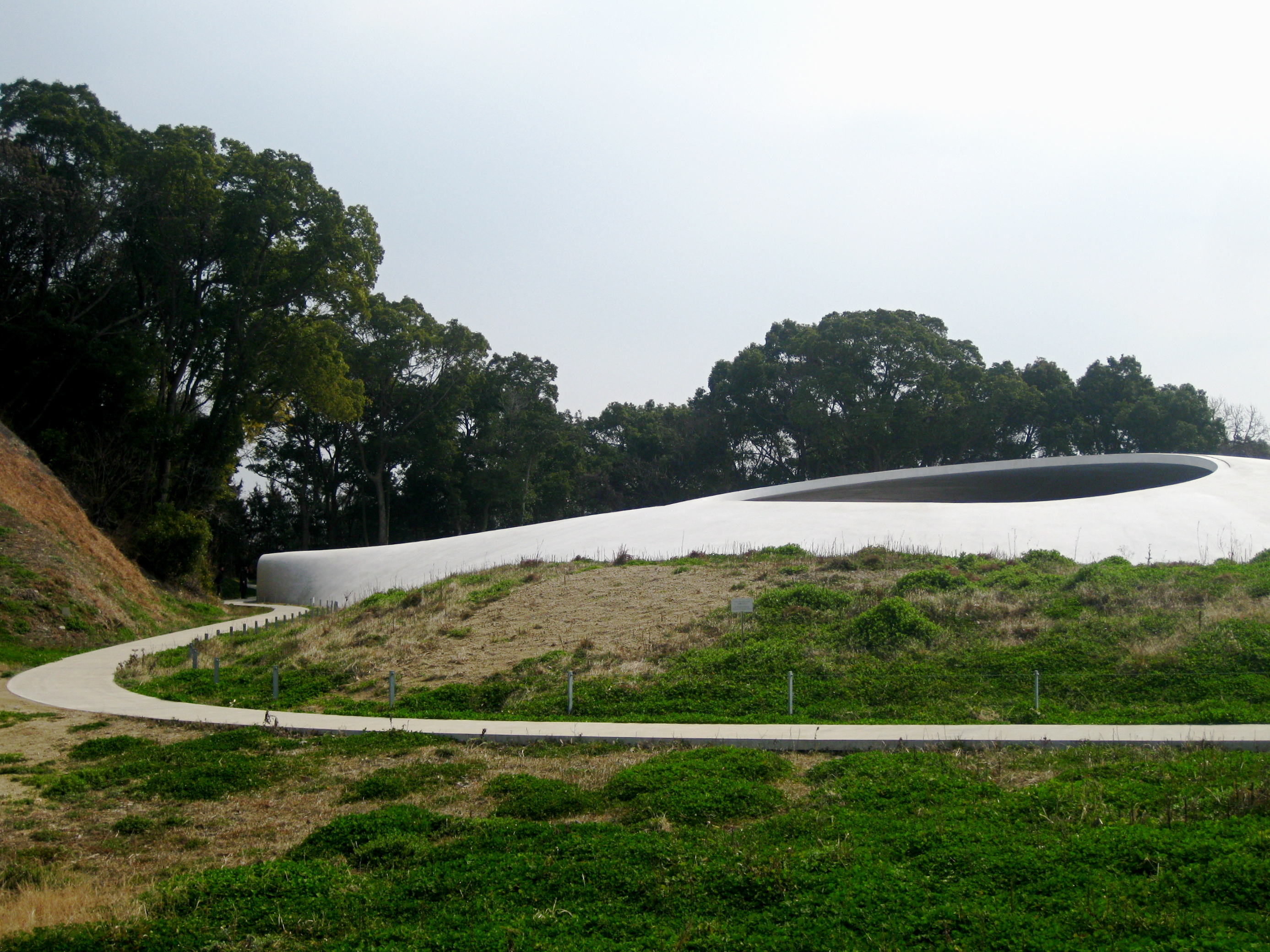
Teshima Museum, Ryue Nishizawa and Rei Naito (2010)

Rei Naito (内藤 礼, Naito Rei; born 1961) is a Japanese artist. Naito's work intersects with minimalism, conceptual art, and environmental art, exploring the ways in which human existence is shaped, felt, and made evident amidst its natural surroundings. Using organic and found materials and creating immersive environments that interact with sound, light, and atmosphere, Naito's practice takes a strong interest in the intimate, ambient, and often transient encounters that arise between individuals and artworks.

Naito represented Japan at the 47th Venice Biennale (1997) and exhibited her installation work One Place on Earth (Chijōni hitsotsu no basho o) in the Japan Pavilion, filling the whole of the interior with the immersive piece. Naito is also known for her collaboration with architect Ryue Nishizawa of SANAA on the Teshima Art Museum, where her work Matrix, the single artwork on display, utilizes organic forms to accentuate the porosity between phases of the natural world.

In recent years, Naito has also created smaller-scale sculptural works that derive from human forms, alongside her extant abstraction-based installation practice. Matrix (2010), along with Being Given (2001), are her two permanent installation works, both located within the Seto Island Sea. Smaller scale sculptural works reimagine mundane objects by collaborating and altering exhibition spaces and ambient environments. These works include pillow for the dead (1998) exhibited in the Tokyo National Museum, as well as The joys were greater (2015) shown in Gallery Koyanagi. Her work has been widely exhibited and held in collections at numerous institutions across the globe including the 21st Century Museum of Contemporary Art, the New Museum, the Tel Aviv Museum of Art, the Museum of Modern Art, Kamakura & Hayama, the National Gallery Singapore, and the Museum für Moderne Kunst.

== Early life and education ==
Naito was born in Hiroshima in 1961. She enrolled in Musashino Art University and graduated with a degree in visual communication design in 1985.

== Career ==
=== Apocalypse Palace (1985-87) ===
An expansion of her graduation project at Musashino Art University, Apocalypse Palace serves as an early illustration of Naito's interest in immersive environments, spirituality, and the centrality of individual experience in the artistic encounter. The installation consisted of a tent-like translucent white cotton structure within which a long white table was situated. A litany of handmade objects crafted out of paper, thread, beads, wire, plastic wrap, and other miscellaneous materials was neatly arranged upon the table, and lamps lined the perimeter of the room, imparting a luminous white glow to the space. Naito's impulse was to "create a spiritual place of her own," using light, form, and everyday materials to construct an extensive altar-like assemblage that evoked intimacy through its scale while alluding to the vibrant ecosystem of a city, held together by transitory, fragile parts.

The work was first exhibited outside of the university at the alternative exhibition venue Sagacho Exhibit Space, and continued to be shown in various contexts, including in 1986 at Parco Space 5 as the subject of her first solo exhibition.

=== une place sur la Terre [One Place on the Earth] (Chijōni hitsotsu no basho o) (1991-2003) ===
Naito rose to international prominence with One Place on the Earth. Naito expands on the transient, permeable quality of life through the use of fabric assemblages—an extended idea from her previous works, Apocalypse Palace (1985–87). An elliptical shaped-space was formed out of a large flannel cloth, within which a constellation of small sculptural pieces made of plant material, thread, needles, and other materials were arranged on the floor within biomorphic forms outlined by twine. In bringing her sculptures from the tabletop to the ground, Naito began to emphasize the "surface of the earth" as a core aspect of her practice. The work has also often been described through maternal metaphors, with curators such as Fumio Nanjo likening the tent to "the inside of a woman's body." The work has been identified as the first within her oeuvre to be described in terms of "motherhood" on the artist's own accord.

First exhibited at Sagacho Art Space in 1991, the work traveled to the New Museum in New York in 1992, Galerie du Rond Point in Paris and Mostyn in Wales in 1993, and the Nagoya City Art Museum in 1995, followed by the Japanese pavilion at the Venice Biennale in 1997.

Naito's exhibition instructions for the piece stipulated that the work would be experienced by one viewer at a time, who would enter after removing their shoes. The privileging of individual encounter and isolation from other bodies highlights Naito's concern for the potential of the art piece to be objectified and deadened as a consumable, singularly comprehensible "work of art" by becoming subject to the agreement of the collective gaze in the gallery space. By isolating the visitor, Naito asserts, disparities in scale between viewer and work become more evident, a distinct form of self-understanding unencumbered by the presence of mediating forces emerges, and the "world" as produced within the boundaries of the artwork shift with each exposure to a new visitor.

==== Critical reception at the Venice Biennale ====
Naito's installation at the Venice Biennale was subject to criticism due to its restrictions on attendance (one visitor at a time was admitted for a ten-minute period, with daily attendance capped at 40), and the time-consuming needs for upkeep. Naito remained on site for the duration of the exhibition, intervening every few visits to inspect and make fixes to the delicate work. In this regard, Naito's work also elucidated the challenges of working within the systems of contemporary exhibition-making, given the needs of the increasingly accelerated, commercialized, and high-trafficked nature of globalized art festivals.

=== Being Given (Kono koto o), Art House Project "Kinza" (2001) ===
Being given, Naito's first permanent work, remains one of the artist's few permanent installation pieces owing to her tendency towards ephemeral, site-specific installation practice. As part of Benesse's philanthropic art initiatives on Naoshima, the "Art House Project" involves the commissioning of artists to restore and create site-specific artworks in vacant houses across Honmura village. Naito was commissioned to produce an installation work inside "Kinza," a small minka built in the 18th century.

Naito stripped the house of its former furnishings, took down the walls separating the five rooms to create a single cohesive space, covered the windows, and removed the impluvium and flooring to expose the structure to the elements and unearth the original ground of the building. The earth around the perimeter of the building was removed to create a 15-centimeter opening around the base of room, which serves as the sole source of light. The original pillars were retained, as was the plaster, which was sifted and used to re-plaster the walls. As the house is located within a residential area, sounds of life from the world outside the house diffuse into the space, creating an environment that brings together traces of human life from the past and present, collapsing time and dissolving distinctions between spaces. Visitors are prompted to enter the space one by one, as Naito encourages beholders to "become alone to recognize the existence of a world outside."

=== Matrix (Bokei) (2010) ===
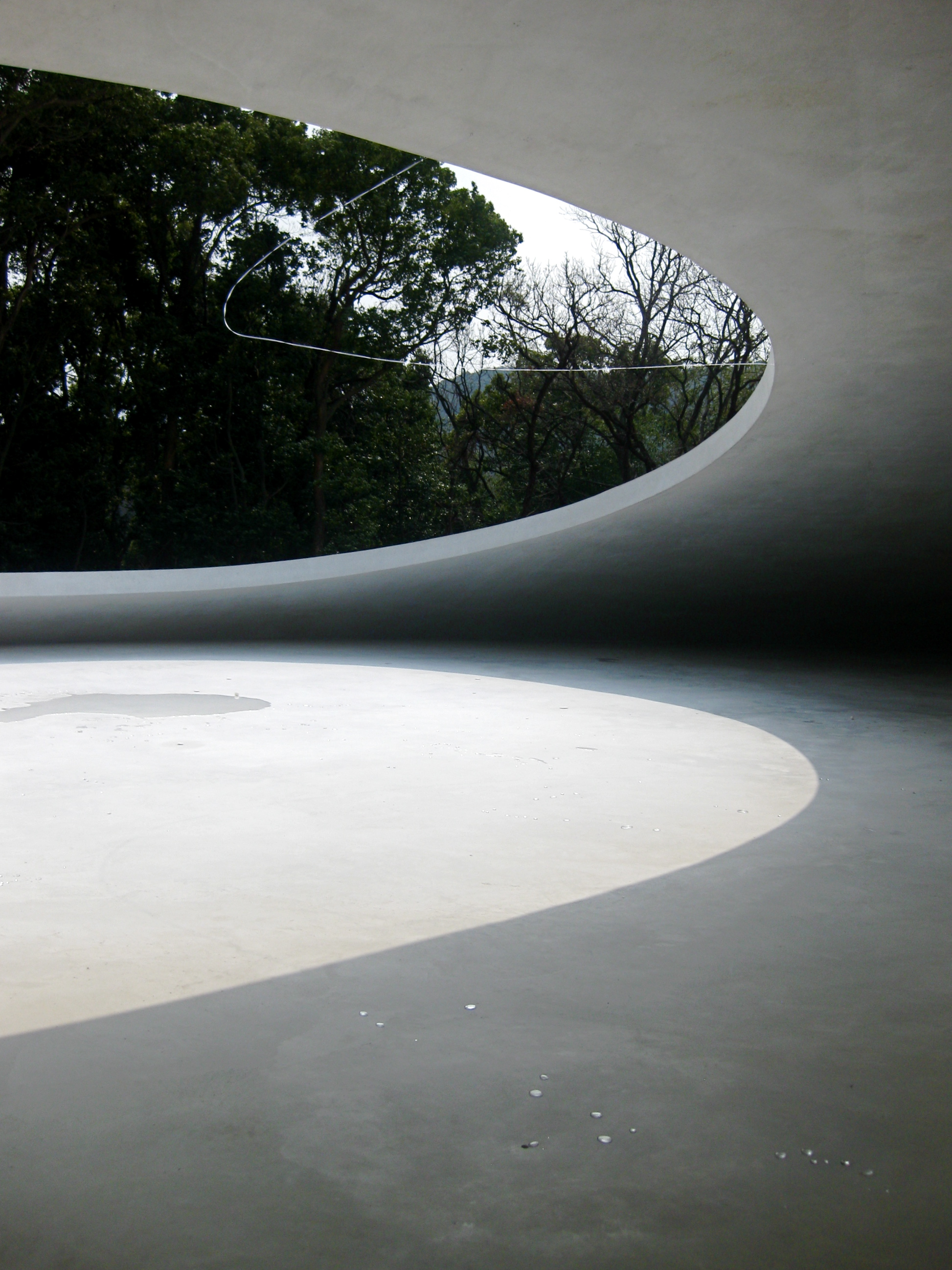
Matrix (2010) interior detail

In 2004, architect Ryue Nishizawa of SANAA began working on a design for a new museum in the Seto Inland Sea as part of the Benesse corporation's ongoing development of art projects in the region. Nishizawa proposed a concrete shell structure that was 40 meters wide and 60 meters long, reaching a height of 4.5 meters at the apex of the curved roof, when Naito, who was simultaneously working on artistic experiments with water and air, was approached. A series of consultations and research on climactic conditions and seasonal shifts proceeded between the two, and the final work Bokei [Matrix] was executed with a waterdrop-shaped form with two circular oculi, sited along a hillside overlooking terraced rice fields.

Air, water, sound, fallen leaves, and insects flow freely in and out of the structure through the large oval apertures, diffusing the boundaries between the interior and exterior. Similarly, categorical boundaries are collapsed, as Naito reflected in an interview: “Architecture, artwork, nature diffuse into one another and turn into one, becoming impossible to differentiate.”

The concrete floor is punctuated by tiny holes that when pressed, send water out from an underground spring, or channel water into other holes, while the emerging droplets flow and pool across the nearly imperceptibly sloped floor. The position and number of the holes, as well as the flow direction and amount of spring water that moves through them have been carefully determined by Naito. Visitors are required to enter the space barefoot, and the water-repellent floor has been similarly calibrated to create diverse types of movements and interactions among the water droplets.

In honing in on the natural landscape of Teshima, the piece also harkens to the environmental degradation that began in the region during the 1970s owing to the illegal dumping of industrial waste on the islands. The work re-inscribes the foundational nature of environment to life in Teshima, while its sensitivity to the sensory dimensions of nature highlights the gradual healing that has taken place in the region since the 2000s. The emphasis on water and its behaviors, as critic Noi Sawaragi notes, also brings to the forefront the interactive systems of the water cycle that sustain life on the island—"spring water, waterways, rice paddies, evaporation, atmosphere, rain, underground filtration, spring water. All that is happening in the Teshima Art Museum represents the 'matrix' of the place that Teshima is."

=== Recent work ===
Since 2011, Naito has begun to create works that are reminiscent of human forms, which have become incorporated into her broader language of abstraction and earthly forms. The artist remarked in an interview that Teshima Museum project signified a crystallization of her thinking around transitory encounters and the infinite motions of organic life; after completing the work, she moved towards people-making as an alternative mode of thinking through experiences of life on earth. Working primarily with wood, Naito creates small, anonymized figures that recall other typologies of figurines and statues used in intimate settings, such as jizō, kokeshi, and dogū.

In human (2012) exhibited in the Teshima Art Museum, and the Japanese Culture House of Paris, Naito reflects on the atomic bombing of Hiroshima. The sculptures recall miniature wood carved figures, that are placed next to melted glass bottles–detritus from the Hiroshima bombing in 1945. Through deliberate choice of small scale sculptures and found materials, Naito meditates on the fragility of human presence, and resilience of hope in events of catastrophe.

In 2023, Naito exhibited a series of fifty watercolor works at the Pinakothek der Moderne in Munich, Germany. Combining watery swaths of pigment, a light touch, and a generous use of negative space, Naito's atmospheric compositions echo the delicate tenor of her sculptural works, and exhibit a familiar sensitivitity towards the tension between presence and absence in form and matter.

In her exhibition, come and live - go and live (2024) at the Tokyo National Museum, Naito selected clay objects of the Jomon period and installed them alongside delicate motifs such as beads, glass jars, and pebbles. In collaboration with the exhibition spaces around the Tokyo National Museum the three venues are scattered around usual exhibition spaces. The removal of shutters, carpeting and temporary walls allowed for the clay objects to exist in natural light. Naito describes the relationships between humans and nature in modern day, and ancient times. The clay objects emphasize the primordial pursuit of creation, while her watercolor drawings depict the human tendency to view narrative in landscape.

== Select exhibitions ==
=== Solo exhibitions ===
2024

- "come and live - go and live" Tokyo National Museum, Tokyo

2023

- "breath" Staatliche Graphische Sammlung München, Munich

2020

- "Rei Naito: Mirror Creation" 21st Century Museum of Contemporary Art, Kanazawa

2017

- “Two Lives” Tel Aviv Museum of Art

2014

- "the emotion of belief" Tokyo Metropolitan Teien Art Museum, Tokyo

2009

- "Tout animal est dans le monde comme de l'eau à l'intérieur de l'eau" Museum of Modern Art, Kamakura & Hayama, Kamakura

1997

- "une place sur la Terre" 47th Venice Biennale, Venice
- "Being Called" Karmeliterkloster, Frankfurt

1995

- "Migoto ni harete otozureru o mate" National Museum of Art, Osaka

1991

- "une place sur la Terre" Sagacho Exhibit Space, Tokyo

=== Group exhibitions ===
2021

- "I have lived" Tokyo Biennale 2020/2021

2020

- “Sleeping: Life with Art – From Goya and Rubens to Shiota Chiharu” National Museum of Modern Art, Tokyo

2018

- "“Minimalism: Space. Light. Object.” National Gallery Singapore
- “Buddha’s Life, Path to the Present” De Nieuwe Kerk, Amsterdam

2016

- “Ecce Homo: The Human Images in Contemporary Art” National Museum of Art, Osaka

2014

- “Leap into the Void” Axel Vervoordt Gallery, Antwerp

2013

- “ART ARCH HIROSHIMA 2013 Peace Meets Art!” Hiroshima Prefectural Art Museum

2006

- “The 6th Gwangju Biennale” Gwangju Biennale

2005

- “Decelerate” Kemper Museum of Contemporary Art, Kansas City, MO

1995

- “ON KAWARA 1954, 1954, 1956 / REI NAITO 1991” Nagoya City Art Museum

1993

- “Prospect 93: An international exhibition of contemporary art” Schirn Kunsthalle Frankfurt

1992

- “The Spatial Drive” New Museum, New York

== Awards ==
- Promising Artists and Scholars of Contemporary Japanese Arts by Japan Arts Foundation, (Installation field, 1994)
- 1st Asahi Beer Arts Awards by Asahi Beer Arts Foundation (2003)
- 60th Mainichi Art Prize (2019)
- 69th Minister of Education Award for Fine Arts (2019)
