= Teshima Art Museum =

Art museum on Teshima island, Kagawa, Japan

Coordinates: 34°29′23″N 134°05′29″E

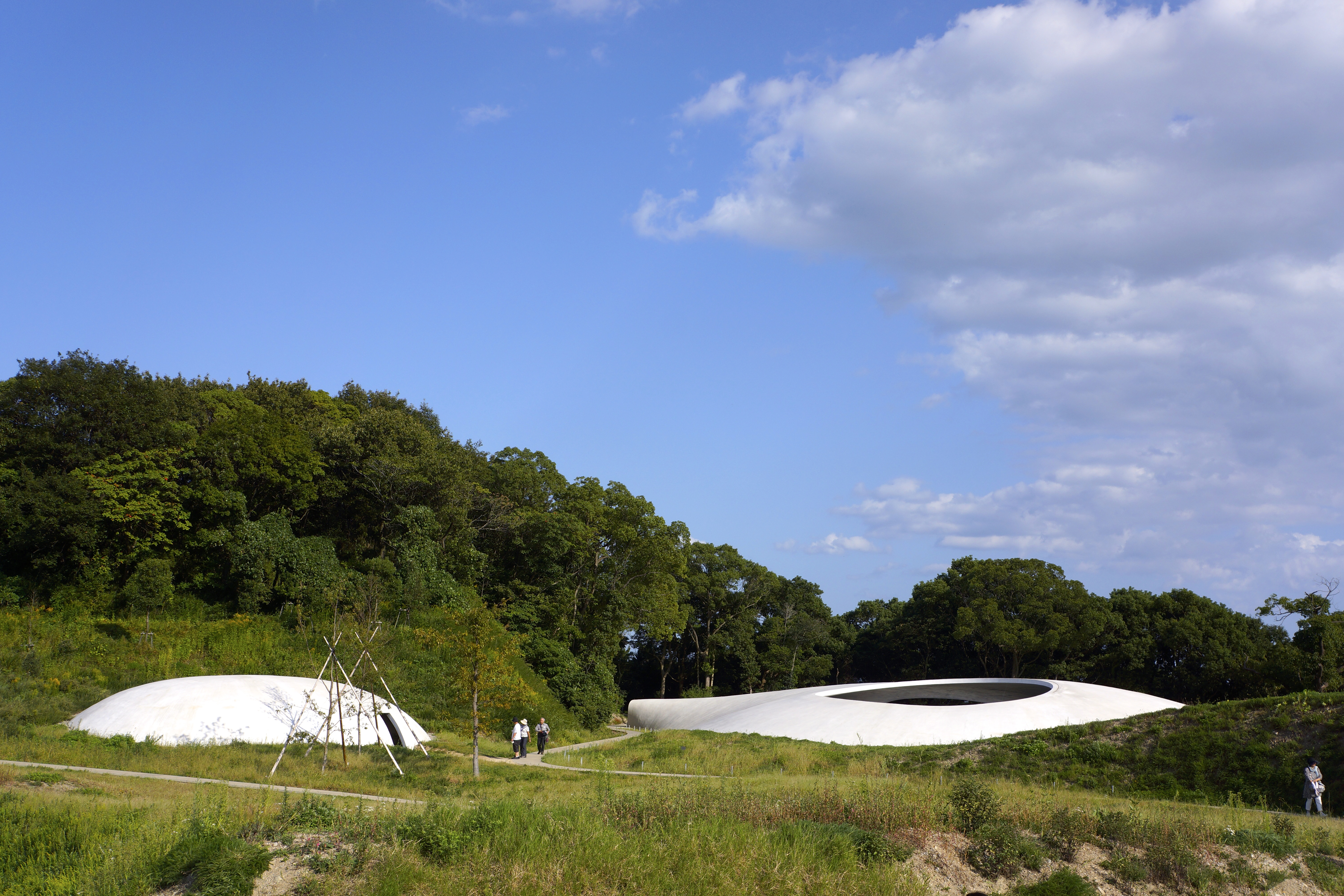
- Established: 2010
- Location: Teshima, Kagawa Prefecture, Japan
- Type: Contemporary Art
- Architect: Ryue Nishizawa
- Website: benesse-artsite.jp/en/teshima-artmuseum

The Teshima Art Museum (豊島美術館, Teshima Bijitsukan) hosts a single piece of artwork and is located on the island of Teshima, Kagawa Prefecture, Japan, in the Seto Inland Sea. It is operated by the Benesse Foundation. The architect is Ryue Nishizawa (co-founder of SANAA). The museum building is made of a freestanding concrete shell which is 25 cm-thick, 40 by 60 meters, and 4 meters at its highest point.

The artwork is titled Matrix and was created by sculptor Rei Naito.

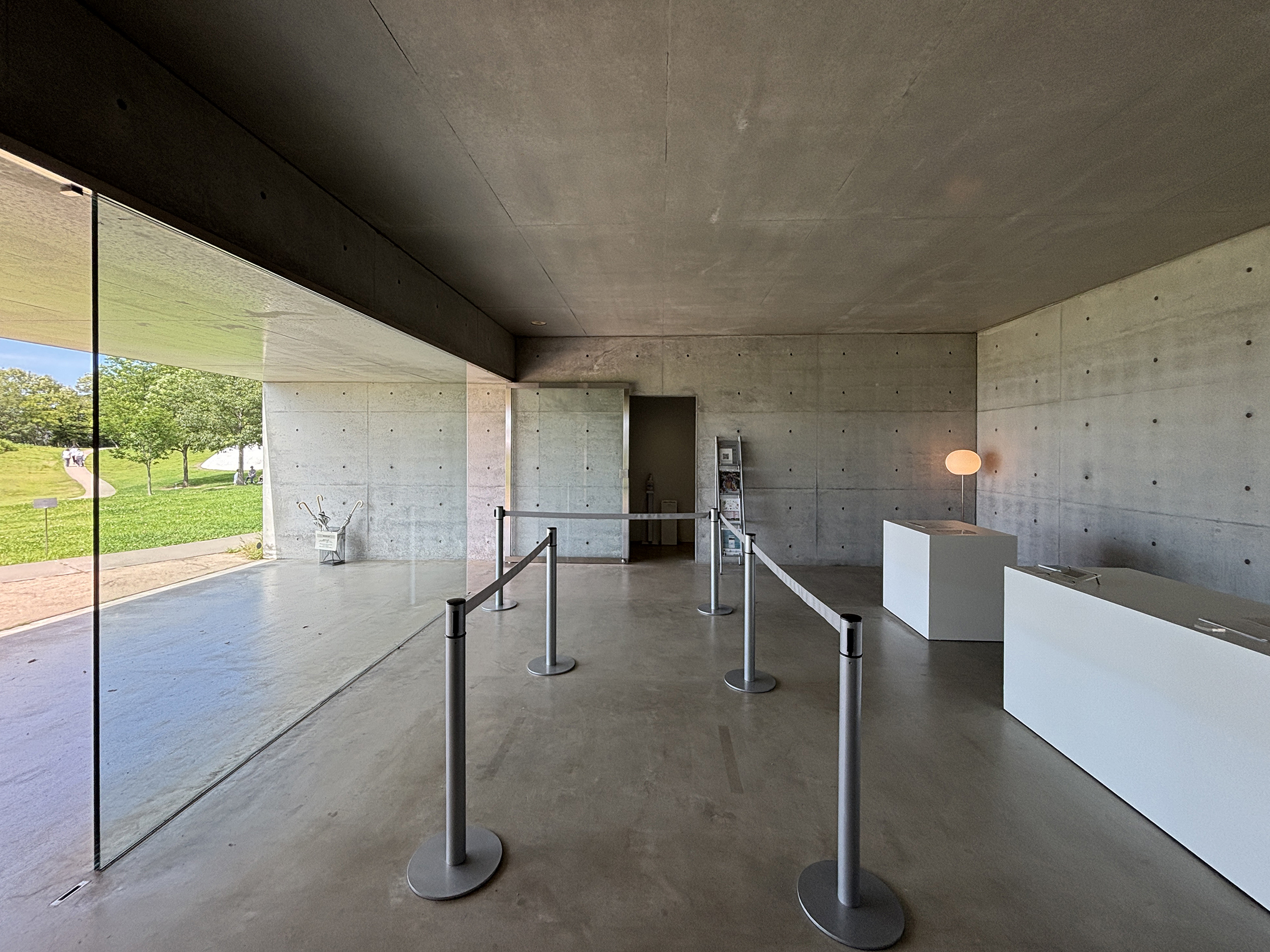
Ticket office

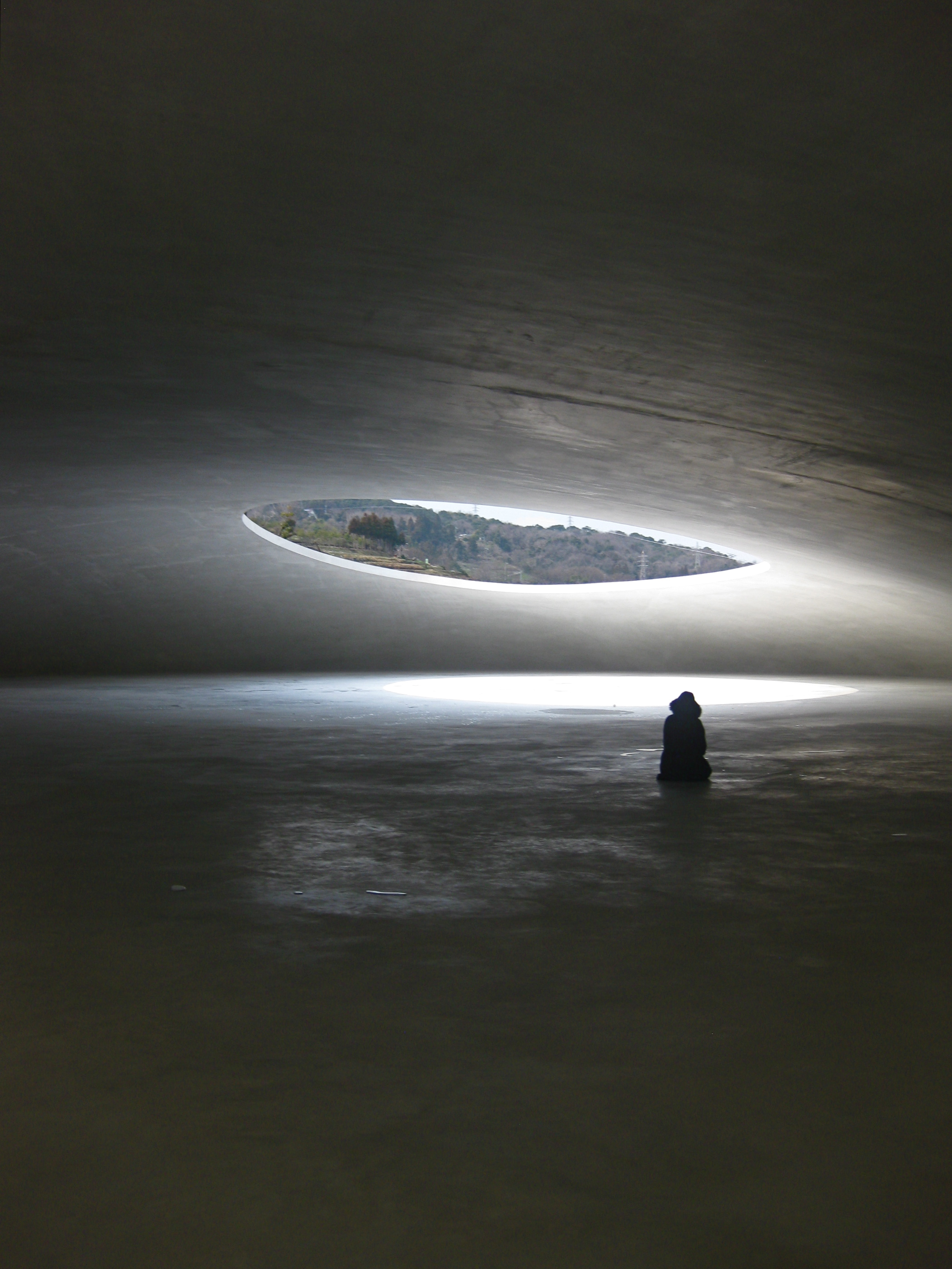
Inside the museum

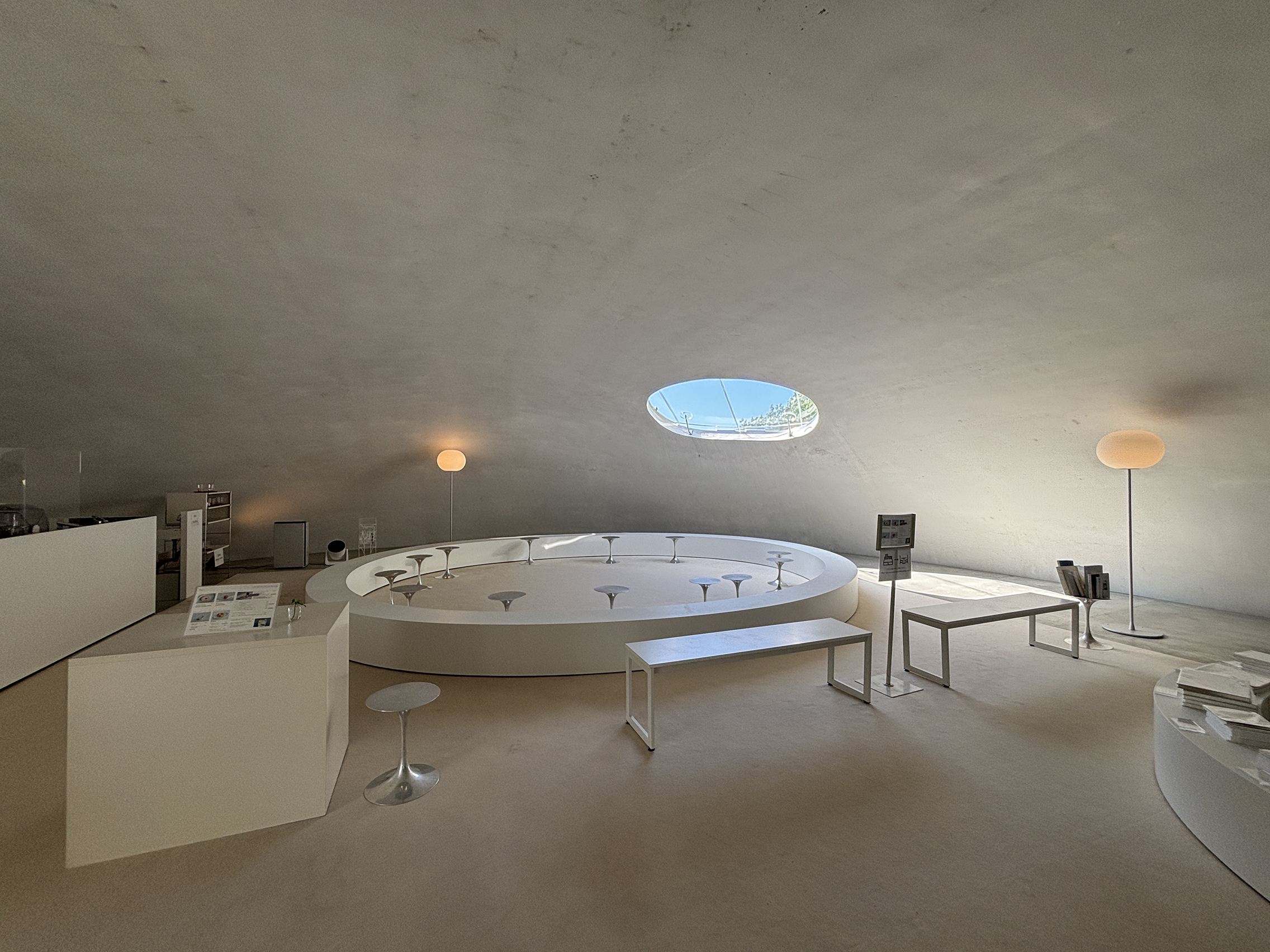
Gift shop and cafe

== See also ==
- Chichu Art Museum
- Inujima Art Project
