= Ryue Nishizawa =

Japanese architect based in Tokyo (born 1966)

- 西沢 立衛
- Born: 1966 (age 59–60); Kanagawa Prefecture, Japan
- Education: Yokohama National University
- Occupation: Architect
- Awards: Rolf Schock Prizes in Visual Arts (2005); Pritzker Prize (2010); Praemium Imperiale(2022); RIBA Royal Gold Medal (2025)

Ryue Nishizawa (Japanese: 西沢 立衛, Hepburn: Nishizawa Ryūe; born 1966 in Kanagawa Prefecture) is a Japanese architect based in Tokyo. A graduate of Yokohama National University, he established his own firm, Office of Ryue Nishizawa, in 1997. In 1995, he co-founded the firm SANAA (Sejima and Nishizawa and Associates) with architect Kazuyo Sejima. In 2010, he became the youngest recipient ever of the Pritzker Prize, together with Sejima.

== Projects ==
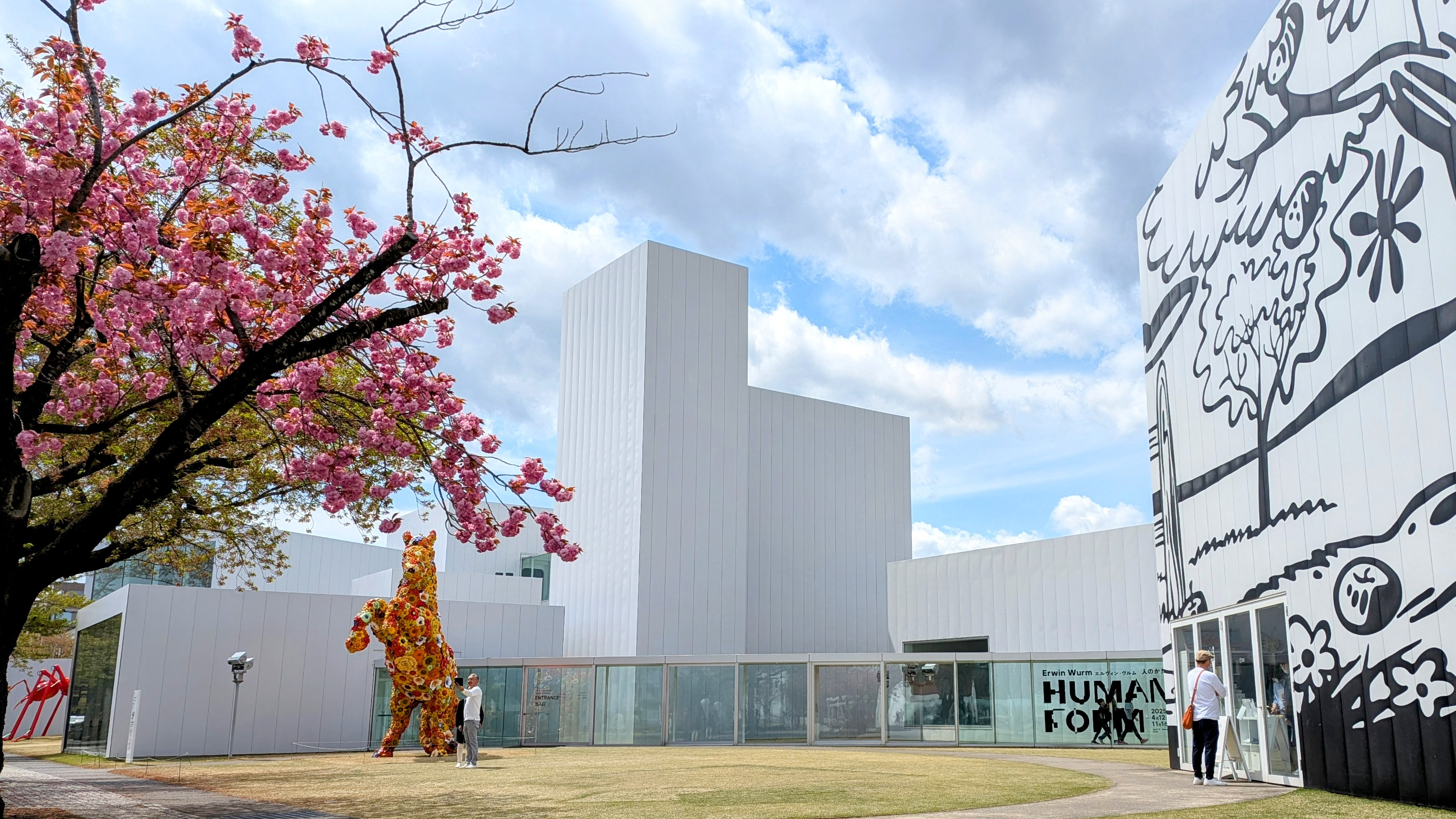
Towada Art Center

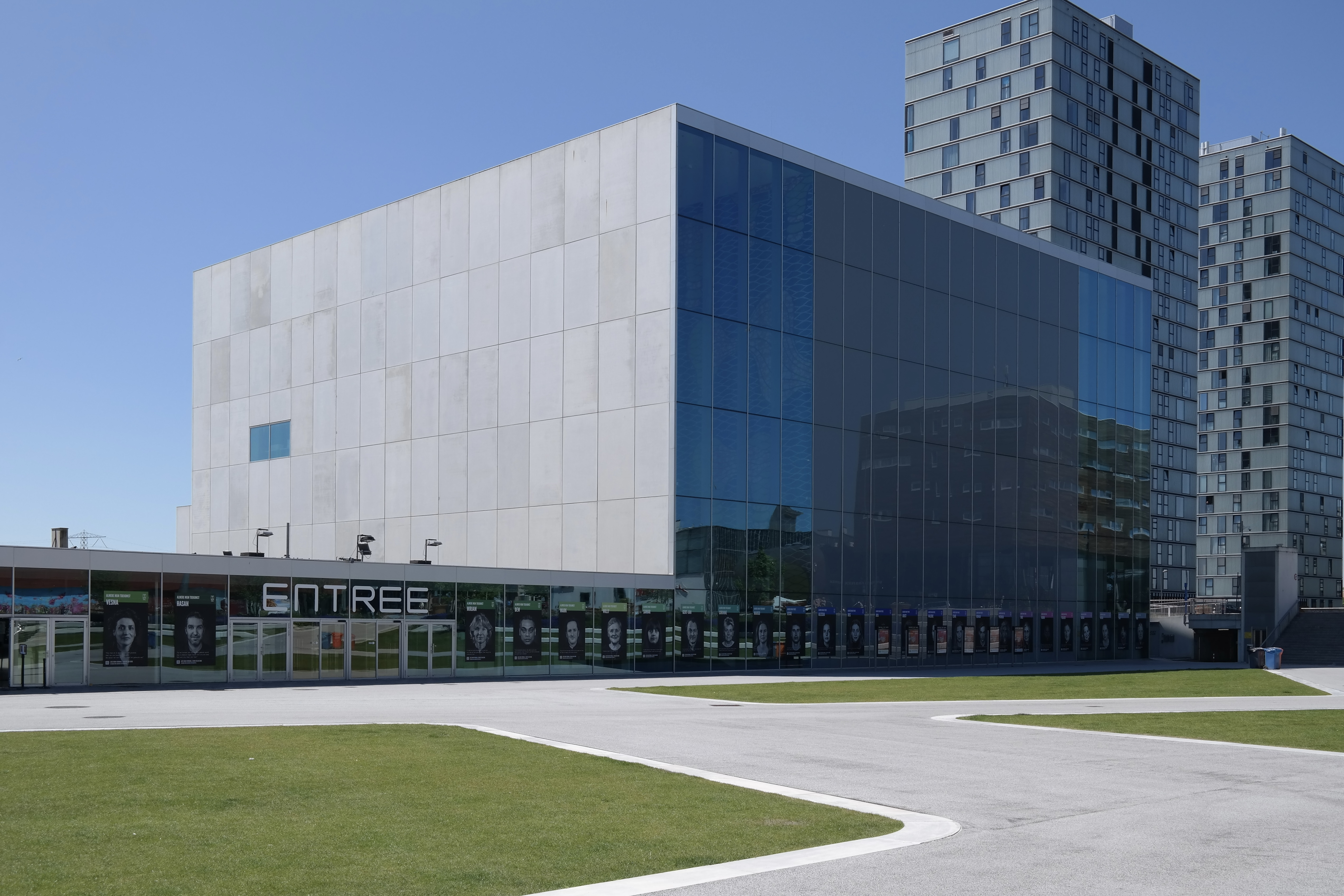
Kunstlinie Almere

- Ogasawara Museum, Nagado, Japan
- Weekend House – 1997 to 1998 – Gunma, Japan
- Takeo Head Office Store – 1999 to 2000 – Tokyo, Japan
- House at Kamakura – 1999 to 2001 – Kanagawa, Japan
- Apartment Building at Ichikawa – 2001 to Present – Chiba, Japan
- Eda Apartment Building – 2002 to Present – Kanagawa, Japan
- Funabashi Apartment Building – 2002 to 2004 – Chiba, Japan
- Moriyama House – 2002 to 2005 – Tokyo, Japan
- Love Planet Museum – 2003 – Okayama, Japan
- Video Pavilion – 2003 to Present – Kagawa, Japan
- House in China – 2003 to Present – Tianjin, China
- Office Building, Benesse Art Site Naoshima – 2004 – Kagawa, Japan
- 21st Century Museum of Contemporary Art – 2004 – Kanazawa, Japan
- A House – 2004 to 2007 – Tokyo, Japan
- Honmura Lounge & Archive – 2005 to Present – Kagawa, Japan
- The New Museum – New York, United States
- Towada Art Center – 2008 – Aomori, Japan
- Teshima Art Museum – 2010 – Kagawa, Japan
- Hiroshi Senju Museum – 2011 – Karuizawa, Japan
- Garden and House – 2013 – Tokyo, Japan

== Exhibitions ==
- Some Ideas on Living in London and Tokyo by Stephen Taylor and Ryue Nishizawa, Canadian Centre for Architecture, Montreal (2008)
- Kazuyo Sejima + Ryue Nishizawa / SANAA, Henry Art Gallery, Seattle (2008)
- Kazuyo Sejima + Ryue Nishizawa SANAA, Towada Art Center, Towada Aomori (2014)
- Conceptions of Space: Recent Acquisitions in Contemporary Architecture, MoMA, New York (2014)
- Japan Architects 1945–2010, 21st Century Museum of Contemporary Art, Kanazawa (2014–2015)
- A Japanese Constellation: Toyo Ito, SANAA, and Beyond, MoMA, New York (2016)
