= Yukinori Yanagi =

Japanese artist

- 柳幸典
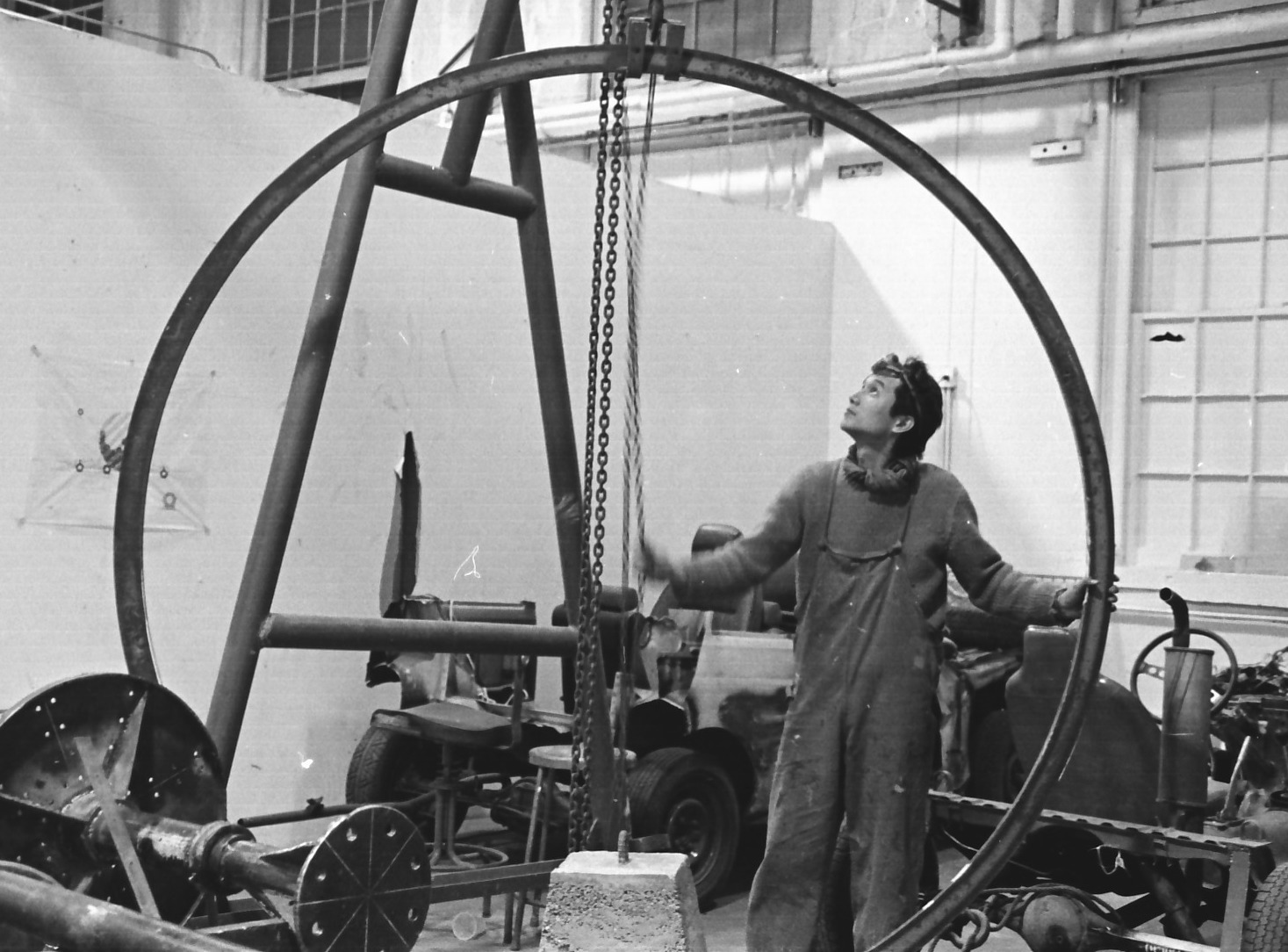
- Born: 2 May 1959 (age 67); Fukuoka, Japan
- Education: Yale University
- Notable work: The World Flag Ant Farm, Inujima Seirensho Art Museum
- Awards: the Aperto Award at the 45th Venice Biennale
- Website: http://www.yanagistudio.net/

Yukinori Yanagi (柳幸典, Yanagi Yukinori; born 1959) is a contemporary Japanese artist.

Yukinori Yanagi is a contemporary Japanese artist who has addressed themes of national and transnational sovereignty, globalization and borders, as well as Japan's imperial history and nationalism. He is considered one of the first postwar Japanese artists that is openly critical of Japanese society and governmental policy. Many of Yanagi's artworks consists of large-scale, site-specific installations that engage with movement and symbols of nationalism.

Yukinori Yanagi achieved a major international breakthrough in 1993 when he was awarded the Aperto Award at the 45th Venice Biennale.Following this recognition, his work entered major international collections, including the Museum of Modern Art (New York) and Tate Modern (London). In 2000, he was among the first foreign artists invited to exhibit at the Whitney Biennial, alongside Cai Guo-Qiang. He is widely recognized for his role in regional revitalization, most notably for the Inujima Seirensho Art Museum. This long-term project began in 1995and culminated in the 2008 opening of a permanent art complex created by revamping a long-defunct copper refinery on the island of Inujima, which has become an integral location of the Setouchi International Art Triennale.

His global profile remains prominent through recent contributions to major biennials including the Busan Biennale 2016 in Busan, South Korea, the 21st Biennale of Sydney, Australia (2018), and the Ad-Diriyah Biennale in Diriyah, Saudi Arabia (2021), as well as significant solo exhibitions including ICARUS at Pirelli HangarBicocca in Milan, Italy (2025) and El Mare Pacificum at Estación MAZ in Guadalajara, Mexico (2026).

Following the completion of the Inujima Seirensho Art Museum, Yanagi established the collaborative team YANAGI + ART BASE. Working alongside architects and designers, he has focused on revitalizing industrial ruins and abandoned structures. His primary ongoing initiative is ART BASE MOMOSHIMA, a non-profit art project established in 2012. His current work continues to expand into the study of international history and territories from a sea perspective, including the Anjwa Island Project / Floating Museum in South Korea, where he continues to explore the reclamation of neglected landscapes through site-specific art.

== Early life and education in Japan ==
=== Early life ===
Yanagi was born and raised in a rural region of Fukuoka, Japan. Growing up in the prefecture closest to the Korean Peninsula allowed Yanagi to grow up with a distinct awareness of the existence of other nations and cultures. He has spoken of his childhood experiences of picking up 'everyday objects' marked with Korean hangul that had washed up on the shore from the Sea of Japan as the beginning of his long-term interest in transpacific and transnational boundaries and movement.

Like many Japanese people of his generation, Yanagi's family was part of the Empire of Japan's Pacific War war effort. An awareness of this familial history has informed the artist's body of work: his father was a fighter pilot, and his paternal grandfather worked in border control in Japan's former colony Manchukuo and was detained for more than a decade in Siberia and China following Japan's surrender. In his artwork, Yanagi considers continuity and diversity with regards to his own position and the place of the Japanese nation within this tumultuous history.

Growing up in the 1960s before the development of widespread video games, Yanagi's childhood activities involved playing with insects in the countryside, especially ants and bagworm moths, and creating things out of various materials such as concrete and wax from a hardware store owned by one of his relatives. Furthermore, Yanagi's uncle was avant-garde artist Miyazaki Junnosuke, a member of Kyushu-ha, which meant Yanagi was accustomed to seeing artistic objects and sculptures from an early age.

=== Education and early career in Tokyo ===
Yanagi earned both a BA and MFA in painting from Musashino Art University in Western Tokyo (1985).

He was interested in the work of artists from the Mono-ha generation, especially of Noriyuki Haraguchi's industrial sculptures, and became increasingly restless within the conventions of the University's painting department. Despite being told that graduation work must be limited to flat works and oil paint only, Yanagi created a sculpture out of wooden supports and was subsequently excluded from the graduate thesis exhibition at the Metropolitan Museum of Tokyo. For his first solo exhibition the following year he burned all the artworks he made in art school and exhibited the ashes in large wooden boxes as the installation Ground Transport Project (1985). It was in this installation that Yanagi first included the element of live ants, a characteristic that he became known for throughout the 1990s.

From 1986, Yanagi began to exhibit artwork that addressed issues of "movement" from the perspective of an outsider of the art world's system. This included his installation Ground Transposition (1987) that included large, spherical sculptures that were scaled to the human form in relation to the proportions to the size of dung beetles and the ball of dung that they roll as part of their ecology. The proportional scaling was a reference to the ancient Egyptian symbolism of the dung beetle as a 'steward of the sun' tasked with physically pushing the weight of the sun across the sky each day, which for Yanagi was a direct reference to the rising sun of the Japanese flag and the weight of Japanese nationalism that the artist felt. In the late 1980s Yanagi exhibited his work at various galleries in Tokyo, Kanagawa, and Fukuoka, including a prominent solo exhibition held at the Hillside Gallery in Daikanyama, in which he executed a smoky performance piece entitled I Feel Yellow (1987). He was awarded the Excellence Award in Art Document from the Tochigi Prefectural Museum of Fine Arts in 1987.

=== Move to the United States ===
Despite the promising trajectory of his art career in Tokyo following his graduation, Yanagi was increasingly disillusioned with the Japanese art world, describing his feeling of "being trapped in a giant Japanese flag, in a cage, engulfed by national identity." The artist moved to United States in 1988 to earn an MFA from the Sculpture Department of the Graduate School of Yale School of Art (1990), where he studied under Vito Acconci and Frank Gehry, among others.

At Yale, Yanagi started to expand on his engagement with Japanese nationalism and history after having the opportunity to read the works of prominent prewar Japanese intellectuals such as Nishida Kitarō and Kuki Shūzō, as well as texts and documents from or about the Pacific War that were difficult to access in Japan but available in the US. These studies allowed the young artist to gain a fuller picture of World War II, and question the omissions and identitarian narratives of both the Japanese and American perspectives of their national wartime history. He began to engage seriously with the idea of "wandering as a permanent position," creating artworks to dissolve the fixity of symbols associated with nations and regions, attempting to account for the changes that occur through time and circumstance.

== Ants and national boundaries – late 1980s–1990s ==
=== Artworks from Yale University, 1988–1989 ===
In the first year of his MFA at Yale University, Yanagi began thinking about the figure of the wandering ant as a multifaceted allegory for transnational movement. He began to regularly incorporate the insects into his artworks, a live element that became emblematic of Yanagi’s body of work from the 1990s. He thought of the ant colony as a perfectly organized communal society—exemplary on the one hand of a blind obedience, but also reflective of an unstoppable ecosystem of working parts that could surpass and dismantle any concept of national boundaries or borders.

Yanagi came up with the Ant Following Plan (1988) at the end of his first semester, in which he tracked the wandering movements of a single ant on the dark floor of his mostly empty 5-by-9-meter studio space using thick red chalk. Shortly after, he debuted American Flag Ant Farm (1989), which he crafted from an Uncle Milton toy ant farm by adding an extra panel with sand colored to appear as the American flag. The 'wandering' ants created tunnels that disintegrated the stars and stripes of the flag, overlaying macro and micro elements (nation vs ant) to dismantle and critique the permanence of the symbol of American national unity.

These earlier works would prove to be very impactful, informing much Yanagi's works for the next ten years. He continued working on and expanding his 'Ant Farm Series' from 1990-2002. He also resurfaced the 'ant following' technique in 1994 for his ongoing series 'Wandering Position' (1994–Present) in which he performs site-specific live tracings of a wandering ant (San Diego, California in 1994; Alcatraz, California, 1996; Anomaly Gallery, Tokyo, 2021). He also uses this technique to create more conventional works for traditional gallery spaces on large format papers and copper plates.

Following his graduation from Yale, Yanagi moved to New York where he started to work internationally.

=== World Flag Ant Farm (1990) ===
In 1991, Yanagi exhibited World Flag Ant Farm (1990) at Los Angeles's LACE (Los Angeles Contemporary Exhibitions) in one of the prominent solo exhibitions that launched his international career. World Flag Ant Farm was a large-scale installation consisting of 180 national 'flags' representing the members of the United Nations at the time. Each 'flag' was made out of a plastic box filled with colored sand in the pattern of the flag. They are interconnected by plastic tubes as they hung on the wall. As the title suggests, the entire artwork functioned as a multitude of interconnected ant colonies which could be viewed through the plastic by audiences. As the tiny insects tunneled through each flag and carried colored grains of sand to other areas, the colors and signs of national unity intermixed and began to dissolve the individual flags, creating a blurred image of a single, more ambiguous flag.

World Flag Ant Farm was well received and Yanagi's approach was considered 'iconic' especially in the context of the end of the Cold War and rising globalization and postcolonial studies, even being featured on the cover of the international art magazine Art in America, despite also facing harsh criticism from animal rights activists. The constant 'wandering' of the ants through each national symbol was exemplary of Yanagi's ongoing engagement with the often muddled processes of globalization, the crossing of transnational borders, the diasporic movement of peoples, and the ultimate precarity of nationhood, race, and identity. Yanagi has said that he personally identifies with the piece, that it is related to the "borders I have had to cross or barriers I have confronted in trying to define myself as a Japanese." The World Flag Ant Farm was exhibited at the 45th Venice Biennale in 1993, where Yanagi became the first Japanese artist to be awarded the Aperto Award as an emerging artist. In 1992, with the aid of the Asian Cultural Council, Yanagi was invited to the International Studio Program at PS1 Contemporary Art Center in New York.

This artwork marked the maturation of Yanagi's ant farm idea and the beginning of a long series of Ant Farm Projects in which colonies of ants would slowly dissolve symbols of nationalism, including flags, currency, and American art. World Flag Ant Farm (1990) is in the collection of the Benesse House, Naoshima Contemporary Art Museum, Naoshima.

=== Ant Farm Project series (1990–2002) ===
Yanagi produced many more flag-based ant farm projects with a wide variety of different geopolitical combinations in the years following his debut of World Flag Ant Farm (1990), while living in New York but traveling to Japan regularly. Some of the largest ant farm installations he made after World Flag Ant Farm include: The World Flag Ant Farm 1991 -Asia- (1991); America (1994), connecting all nations of North and South America; Asia-Pacific Ant Farm (1995); and Eurasia (2001). Some of the more political pieces he produced included: The 38th Parallel (1991) connecting North and South Korea; Pacific - the Ant Farm Project (1996), connecting Japan and the U.S.; Union Jack Ant Farm (1994), encompassing the former British Empire; DMZ (1995) connecting North and South Korea and an ambiguous zone between them that alluded to the DMZ; and 2 China (1997), connecting China and Taiwan.

Pacific - the Ant Farm Project (1996) gained particular traction in art and academic circles and is now in the Tate Museum's collection. To create it, Yanagi not only included the countries that border the Pacific Ocean, but also the nations that once had colonies in the Pacific, as well as indigenous groups like the Māori of New Zealand that have still not regained sovereignty over their territories. As such, the work challenged 'neutral' regional histories and symbols of sovereignty, instead engaging with the history of violent contestation in the Asia Pacific region.

=== Money series (1999–2002) ===
In the later 1990s, Yanagi also began to create ant farm projects that engaged with a variety of national currencies, creating installations centering on large-scale motifs of American, Japanese, European, and other bills. Some works include In God We Trust (1999), Dollar Pyramid (2000), Yukichi KV644955H (2002), and Euro Circuit (2002). Euro Circuit consisted of 12 ant colony units, one to represent the highest value of cash currency for each country that originally joined the European Union. As the ants tunnel through the installation, the distinctive currencies gradually dissolve into a 'universal' banknote, demonstrating Yanagi's reflections on the possibilities of a world becoming more and more transnational.

== Imperial symbolism and Article 9 – 1990s ==
=== Hinomaru series (1990–1992) ===
From the early 1990s, Yanagi also produced a series of sculptures and site-specific installations that aimed to deconstruct the nationalist ideology of modern Japan through the motif of the Hinomaru, or the Japanese flag. The first of these works, Hi-no-maru 1/36 was produced for his first solo exhibition in New York at the alternative space STOREFRONT for Art and Architecture in 1990. Hi-no-maru 1/36 (1990) was designed with consideration to STOREFRONT's unique, triangular exhibition space. Positioned in a 10-part radial corner, Yanagi created an infinity mirror using reflections on opposing walls of angled mirrors in order to produce the illusion of one red circle with radiating beams, a direct reference to the flag adopted by the Japanese imperial army during the Pacific War. This work was exhibited alongside American Flag Ant Farm (1989), becoming a New York debut that demonstrated Yanagi's ongoing engagement with the instability of national borders and his own 'entrapment within mobility.'

One particularly acclaimed piece from this series is Banzai Corner (1991). For this work, Yanagi arranged rows of red Ultraman and Ultra Seven toy figurines into an arc with their bodies facing a mirrored corner to produce the image of a red circle. The uniforms of the toys create an illusion that once again alludes to the radiating beams of the Japanese Empire's military flag. Each character has been carefully arranged so that its right arm is raised in the air to imply a victorious 'Banzai' in praise of the hinomaru, but viewers can see that in reality the figurines only celebrate their own reflection. Yanagi's use of Ultraman and Ultra Seven figurines for this artwork has been attributed to the Okinawan identity of the character's creator, Tetsuo Kinjō, who grew up during the American occupation of Okinawa. For Yanagi, the idea of alienation and otherness in Japan does not only refer to foreign nations, but also "to people living in Japan—Korean, Chinese, native Ainu, and Okinawans."

Yanagi also produced a billboard-sized neon work, Hinomaru Illumination (1992) which was exhibited at his solo exhibition at the Benesse House, Naoshima Contemporary Art Museum, Kagawa in 1993; Art Market Fuji Television Gallery in 2001; as the central window artwork for the seminal exhibition "Japanese Art After 1945: Scream Against the Sky" at the Guggenheim Museum SoHo in 1994; as well as again at his solo exhibition "Akitsushima" at the Hiroshima City Museum of Contemporary Art in 2001. This neon work is visually related to other Japanese neo-pop artists of the early 1990s, but it also exposes the "feeble foundation of national illusion" of national symbols that are harnessed when convenient—a symbol that can be turned 'on' and 'off' at will. For example, for Amaterasu and Haniwa (1993) the neon flag was exhibited in the context of the Shinto Sun Goddess Amaterasu, alongside haniwa clay figurines that harken to the Kofun or Yamato period that has been associated with Japanese cultural origin. In addition, for Hinomaru Container (1992) Yanagi created another space of mirrored illusion within a shipping container shaped like an ancient tumulus (kofun) but cumulating with a refracted neon Yen symbol (¥), critiquing the conflation of consumerism and identity.

=== Chrysanthemum Carpet (1994) ===
Yanagi explicitly problematized the Greater East Asian Co-Prosperity Sphere and its legacy in his work The Chrysanthemum Carpet (1994), first exhibited at Yanagi's solo exhibition at the Peter Blum Gallery in New York in 1995. The artwork consists of a large, red carpet designed to look like a Japanese passport. It included an outline of the trademark chrysanthemum flower that is the Imperial Seal of Japan, but with only one of its golden petals attached and the remaining 15 scattered around the expanse of the carpet. Black text woven into the carpet stands out starkly against the red background, reading "he loves me, he loves me not" in the languages of the Asian countries once dominated by Japan under the proclaimed Greater East Asian Co-Prosperity Sphere. On the underside of the carpet, hidden from view, Yanagi inscribed texts from three distinctive sections of the Japanese Constitution: Article 19 (Freedom of thought), Article 20 (Freedom of religion), and Article 21 (Freedom of speech, press, and expression). Besides directly confronting the debate about national memory loss and historical revisionism regarding the war period, by juxtaposing the visible imperial symbol with the obstructed democratic constitutional guarantees hidden below, Yanagi's installation pointed to the structural contradictions of Japan's modernization. The Meiji Constitution that marked Japan's emergence as a modern nation state both restored the absolutism of the Japanese Emperor system as well as established a democracy, and furthermore Japan's postwar constitution was established by the U.S. Occupation forces. The artist's choice to obstruct the democratic principles from view on the underside of the carpet alludes to the subtle continuity of the survival of the Japanese emperor system, even in the postwar.

In the exhibition space, Yanagi's red carpet led to an Occupation-era photograph of SCAP General Douglas MacArthur standing with Emperor Hirohito, captioned as Chrysanthemum and Sword with a quote by poet and novelist Mishima Yukio superimposed in red, reading "Why should his Imperial Majesty become human?" This inclusion evokes criticisms of the continuities and discontinuities of Japanese sovereignty 'before' and 'after' of the Pacific War, implicating the resilience of Japanese nationalism as well as the American occupation of Japan decades later. About this work, the artist stated, "All these people died for the emperor because they thought he was a god, and it turned out that he was just a small man with a human voice." Yanagi's carpet and the historical photograph have been installed together for several exhibitions together in the 1990s, including at the Art Tower Mito Contemporary Art Center in Ibaraki and the National Gallery of Australia in Canberra, both of which also included war paintings from the Pacific War as part of the installation.

In 1997, Yanagi created a smaller version of the Chrysanthemum Carpet as limited edition multiple entitled Loves Me/Loves Me Not (1997) during his residency at the Fabric Workshop and Museum in Philadelphia, Pennsylvania.

=== "Project Article 9" Exhibition, 1995 ===
In 1995, 50 years after the end of World War II, Yanagi became the first artist to specifically address Article 9 of the Japanese Constitution, which renounced Japan's ability to wage war after the end of World War II. To mark the significance of the year, the Queens Museum in New York hosted Yanagi's solo show entitled "Project Article 9." For this exhibition, Yanagi produced a series of textual installations that focused explicitly on the Article 9 clause in the postwar Japanese constitution. He modified a photograph of SCAP General Douglas MacArthur standing with Emperor Hirohito (the same photo utilized in his Chrysanthemum Carpet installation) and prepared two new large-scale installation artworks, Forbidden Box (1995) and Article 9 (1995).

Yanagi superimposed a historical photo of SCAP General Douglas MacArthur and Emperor Hirohito standing together with the full text of Article 9 of Japan's Constitution in three different forms: the draft version originally written by MacArthur, the finalized Japanese version, and its English translation. According to the Queens Museum's executive director Carma C. Fauntleroy, Yanagi's concentration on textual elements and translation led "viewer[s] to reflect on the vagaries of communication through language and its implications in national and international arenas."

Yanagi utilized his residency at the Fabric Workshop and Museum in Philadelphia, Pennsylvania to create The Forbidden Box (1995) for the exhibition. The installation was made from two large-scale sheets of sheer nylon voile fabric, with screenprints of the giant mushroom cloud that occurred when the United States dropped the atomic bomb on the city of Hiroshima in 1945. In addition to the image, the 17-foot-long sheets of fabric also depict the text from Article 9, with the version originally written by MacArthur printed on the rear sheet, and the English translation of the Japanese version in the front, intended as a way for viewers to see the differences in the rhetoric between the United States and Japan. Like a cloud of smoke, the sheets of fabric seem to billow out from a lead box that had the words "Little Boy," the name of the atomic bomb, inscribed on the lid. Yanagi has stated that he included the box as a way to bring together two folktales, the Japanese children's folktale of Urashima Tarō and the Greek myth of Pandora's Box. On this, Yanagi stated, "universality of children's tales enables us to know that we, as a species, share common core values and hopes all around the globe." The mythologies of the box parallel Yanagi's allegory for Japan that at once acknowledges Japan's victimization in the aftermath of the atomic bombs but also the nation's own role as a colonial aggressor in the Asia Pacific — the Pandora's box revealed a hope for a future world with no more victims of nuclear warfare.

Yanagi also produced a large-scale neon light installation entitled simply "Article 9" for the exhibition, consisting of a set of neon signs encased in plastic box frames that spelled out the Japanese version of Article 9. However, the neon signs were disassembled, seemingly cast off in a pile of disjointed, glowing red parts incomprehensible as a whole. They cast red light around the exhibition space onto Yanagi's other works.

Yanagi's artworks from the "Project Article 9" show went on to be exhibited in Japan at the Kirin Plaza Osaka in 1995. Forbidden Box and Article 9 were also included more than 10 years later in Japanese curator Watanabe Shinya's exhibition "Into the Atomic Sunshine" amongst works by other artists that engaged with Japan's war history at Hillside Gallery in Daikanyama in 2008, Puffin Room in New York in 2008, and the Okinawa Prefectural Museum & Art Museum in 2009.

== Inujima Project (1995 - 2008) ==
=== Inujima Seirensho Art Museum ===
In 1992, Yanagi was invited to hold a solo exhibition at the brand new Naoshima Contemporary Art Museum (now Benesse House at Benesse Art Site Naoshima). He fell in love with Naoshima and the Seto Inland Sea, returning many times from his studio in Japan in the years following, searching for an opportunity to start a long term project in the area that addressed the harmful scars that the rapid industrialization of Japan had left on the beautiful region during the Meiji Period. After three years of looking for an appropriate site, Yanagi came across Okayama Prefecture’s Inujima in 1995, a depopulated island scattered with the ruins of a copper refinery dating back to the industrial Meiji Period, and the inspiration for Yanagi's Inujima Project was formed.

In 1995, Yanagi came up with his vision for the revitalization of the entire island of Inujima; he aimed to revamp the long-defunct copper '"seirensho" (refinery) as a permanent, site-specific artwork using renewable energy, a project that was realized with the support from Benesse Corporation's CEO at the time, Soichiro Fukutake. Yanagi and Fukutake were able to acquire Mishima Yukio's 'Shōtō House,' the former residence of the novelist and poet whose work Yanagi had engaged with in his artworks throughout the previous decade. Using dismantled and reconstructed parts of Mishima's residence, Yanagi spent years building a series of installations entitled Hero Dry Cell (2008) within the copper refinery, creating a permanent artwork that was also fused with the architectural heritage of the industrial site.

After 13 years of collaborative work, Yanagi's Inujima Art Project was opened in 2008 as the Inujima Seirensho Art Museum. The Inujima Seirensho Art Museum has become a forerunner of the Setouchi International Art Triennale, a contemporary art festival that takes place across the islands in the Seto Inland Sea. In 2010, the inaugural Setouchi International Art Triennale featured three installations created by Yanagi in collaboration with architect Kazuyo Sejima, in addition to the Injuma Seirensho Art Museum.

Due to his long term project in Japan, Yanagi began traveling often between his studios in New York and Inujima, and eventually the artist closed his studios in the United States to move back to Japan full time. He set up in a self-designed studio situated on the north face of the mountains facing the Genkai Sea, in Itoshima City, Fukuoka prefecture. In 2005, he began working as an associate professor in the Faculty of Art at Hiroshima City University. He started a Contemporary Art and Theory Major in the Faculty of Arts and launched the Hiroshima Art Project, utilizing facilities that were unused due to the exposure to radiation as sites to exhibit artworks.

=== Hero Dry Cell (2008) ===
Inside the defunct copper refinery that makes up the Inujima Seirensho Art Museum, Yanagi spent more than a decade constructing a six-part permanent art installation entitled Hero Dry Cell (2008) that utilized mirrors, natural light, local stones, water elements, and architectural collage to create an interconnected, multi-layered installation about the modernization of Japan and legacy of the postwar.

Hero Dry Cell is made up of six parts that unfold inside the museum "like a hand scroll" in the following order: Icarus Cell, Solar Rock, Slag Note, Mirror Note, Icarus Tower, and Solar Note. The second part, Solar Rock (2008) is of particular interest, using a natural light leak to create the illusion of a total eclipse—a black hinomaru. A black half shadow circle is created with light and then reflected in a dark pool of water gathered below on a large slab of local Inujima granite, creating the illusion of a full circle of a Black Sun rising, perhaps another addition to Yanagi's Hinomaru Series that critiqued the imperial-era nationalism associated with the Japanese flag. The granite megalith embedded into the ground of Solar Rock can be connected to Yanagi's keen interest in the Mono-ha movement. In front of the black hinomaru, Yanagi's 'architectural collage' appeared to float in mid-air as deconstructed panels of a tatami-mat room from Mishima Yukio's former residence lined up perfectly in alignment to lead the viewers' eye into the shadowy abyss of the Black Sun, even as the windows catch light and dazzle the retina simultaneously. This sensation is similarly described by the artist himself when recounting his first morning on Inujima in 1995: the rising sun made an "imprint on his retina" that developed into this six-part installation which functions an "after-image of the sun he saw that first morning."

== Pacific Project (1997- present) ==
Following his earlier project, Fieldwork on Alcatraz (1996), Yanagi began viewing specific sites as intersections of complex historical, cultural, and social contexts. The series formally initiated with Pacific K100B (1997), a cast-iron model of the battleship Kongō exhibited at the 1998 Taipei Biennial. By examining the submerged sunken battleship from a sea perspective, Yanagi seeks to excavate forgotten borders and Japan's detached territories, treating the Pacific seabed as a repository of hidden history.

The series is considered an exploration of the "artistry of violence" inherent in the technical craft of war machinery. By replicating childhood plastic model kits in cast iron, the work initiates a reassessment of collective histories and state exploitation. These installations address how technological advances in naval construction historically served as instruments of imperial expansion and national power.

The project made its major institutional debut with the solo exhibition Akitsushima at the Hiroshima City Museum of Contemporary Art (MoCA) in 2000, featuring the photograph Akitsushima and the cast-iron Akitsushima 50 • I. This particular work emerged from Yanagi's personal underwater explorations of the second World War II Japanese warship Akitsushima in Coron Bay, Philippines. Yanagi further developed the series with Nagato 70 • I (2020). This work was informed by his fieldwork conducted in 1996 at Bikini Atoll—the site of Cold War hydrogen bomb testing where the battleship Nagato was sunk. Often accompanied by illustrated assembly instructions, these works have been exhibited extensively at Hiroshima's MoCA and were featured in a 2021 solo exhibition at Blum & Poe, Los Angeles.

== Project God-Zilla (2010–present) ==
This project evolved from Eyeball Flower Garden (2010), a site-specific garden in Inujima featuring images of historical incidents projected onto a massive eyeball, presented at the Setouchi International Art Festival 2010. The project expanded significantly following the 2011 Fukushima nuclear disaster. In response to the incident, Yanagi conceptualized a new direction for the series, drawing simultaneous inspiration from the prominent eyeball imagery in Ai-Mitsu's 1938 oil painting, Landscape with an Eye. Beginning with Project God-zilla -Landscape with an Eye- exhibited at BankART1929 in Kanagawa (2016), the project developed into large-scale installations incorporating salvaged objects and recycled materials—such as scrap wood, barrels, and debris bags—arranged in non-fixed configurations. From this point onward, the series consistently featured a central eyeball that serves as a projection screen for archival video footage of hydrogen bomb tests conducted in the Pacific Ocean.

The series interweaves reflections on nuclear destruction with pop culture icons from the collective imaginary. Godzilla, as a monster originally awakened and enlarged by nuclear radiation, serves as a potent symbol for the project. Yanagi notes that the collapse of a nuclear plant following the 2011 tsunami "evokes the catastrophe of Godzilla," drawing a parallel between the creature's cinematic destruction of Tokyo and the reality of modern nuclear failure. He observes that these disasters serve as a reminder "of the difficulties associated with controlling nuclear power, and of the fall of Icarus due to an overweening confidence in the power of technology."

In the solo exhibition ICARUS at Pirelli HangarBicocca in Milan (2025), the work incorporates neon tubes spelling out Article 9 of the Japanese Constitution (the renunciation of war) scattered among rubble. Significant presentations of this series also include the Yokohama Triennale (2017), the 21st Biennale of Sydney (2018), the 3rd Matsu Biennial in Taiwan (2025), and El Mare Pacificum at Estación MAZ in Mexico (2026).

== Island Revitalization & Community Projects (2012–present) ==
In recent years, alongside his creation of individual artworks, Yanagi has focused his practice on island revitalization and non-profit initiatives as a direct response to contemporary social issues and regional decline. These projects involve the transformation of vacant buildings within Onomichi's urban core and the surrounding islands into experimental gallery spaces. By repurposing neglected structures, Yanagi reinforces the connection between contemporary art, local history, and the unique coastal character of the Seto Inland Sea.

=== Art Base Momoshima ===
The island of Momoshima, like many communities in the Seto Inland Sea, faces significant socio-economic challenges, including a rapidly aging and decreasing population and a high density of abandoned properties. In response, Yanagi founded ART BASE MOMOSHIMA in 2012, building on the methodology established with the Inujima Seirensho Art Museum.

The project envisions the entire island as a "living canvas," reviving abandoned houses scattered across the landscape to forge new possibilities for the island's future through the integration of art and regional resources. The main base of the initiative is a former junior high school repurposed as a non-profit art centre. This facility serves as a "frontline base" for the exploration of the Seto Inland Sea's "hidden heritage."

Among the initiative's milestones is the successful special exhibition CROSSROAD (2014), organized in collaboration with artists Miyako Ishiuchi, Noriyuki Haraguchi, and Bruce Conner to bridge the local history of the Seto Inland Sea with the crossroads of modernity and wartime history. As part of this exhibition programming, Onomichi U3—a former 1943 maritime warehouse—was temporarily activated as an alternative art space specifically for the project. Within this venue, Yanagi presented his installation Atomic Article 9 (2014), alongside Noriyuki Haraguchi's presentation of the work F-8E Crusader (2014). Following the success of the inaugural event, the exhibition series was extended with CROSSROAD 2 in 2017 and CROSSROAD 3 in 2018.

Since its founding, the initiative has expanded beyond the school building into several site-specific satellite spaces across the island. These projects involve the adaptive reuse of abandoned structures, transforming them into immersive environments:

- Nisshokan (opened in 2014): Originally built in 1961 as a movie theater "Momoshima Toei", renovation on the structure began in 2013 with an emphasis on preserving the architectural atmosphere of its original era. The space houses Yanagi's significant installation Hinomaru Illumination (2010). Featuring neon motifs of the Japanese flag, this artwork was originally created for the Inujima Art House Project and subsequently relocated to Momoshima.
- OTSU 1731-GOEMON HOUSE (opened in 2020): This facility was transformed from a private house that had remained vacant for 47 years. The space integrates functional architecture with contemporary art, featuring a large, working Goemon-style bath. It houses several significant installations, including Chu Enoki's LSDF 020 and Noriyuki Haraguchi's The relationship of Canvas bag and Ropes (2017). Since 2022, the site has operated as a residence, allowing visitors to stay overnight within the art installations.
- Kyu-shisho (opened in 2021): Formerly the Momoshima Branch Office of Onomichi City Hall, this building was reimagined as a multi-purpose art and community hub. It functions as an exhibition space, rental facility, and guesthouse. Due to its historical and architectural significance, the site was officially designated as a Registered Tangible Cultural Property under Japan's Law for the Protection of Cultural Properties in 2022.

== Art Direction and Community Design ==
Parallel to his art practices, Yanagi provides art direction aimed at improving community design and local identity in the Onomichi region. These projects move art out of the museum and into functional public life. A key initiative is the Onomichi Channel Project, which focuses primarily on urban designs; notable works include the ferry MOMOKAZE (2015) and the public restroom at Fukuda Port on Momoshima (2018). Additionally, his team directed the renovation of gallery cafe ULTRA (2019), a project that converted a vacant structure into a multi-functional art gallery and cafe within a shopping arcade in Onomichi, Hiroshima.

=== Collaborative and Collective Projects (2018–present) ===
To facilitate large-scale, cross-disciplinary works, Yanagi operates through YANAGI + ART BASE, a collective that brings together architects, designers, and craftsmen to work directly alongside local community members. This participatory approach allows for the execution of socially complex initiatives that transform regional revitalization into a shared, localized civic effort. Among these long-term efforts are the Kosagi Island "Bio-Isle" Project (initiated in 2009), which tackles rural depopulation by reclaiming vacant residences to explore sustainable community design, and the ongoing Onomichi Tea Garden House project, which convert traditional hillside structures overlooking the Onomichi Channel as multi-functional cultural and hospitality spaces. In addition to these local, community-focused projects, Yanagi's work extends to several major large-scale and international initiatives:

- Sumiya Kiho-an Project – Art Gallery "Hakutai" (2018) & Art Room "Kohoo" (2021): These hospitality spaces in Kyoto represent an immersive total work of art, where the architectural structure itself is integrated with contemporary art and traditional craftsmanship. Yanagi collaborated with architects to design, structurally rebuild, and curate the entire living environment from the ground up. To execute the interior and material details, Yanagi worked alongside Kyoto-based master artisans—including ceramicists, weavers, and plasterers—bridging historical regional techniques with a modern artistic vision to create spaces where guests physically reside inside the artwork.
- Tsunagi Project (2019–2022): Commissioned for the Tsunagi Art Museum's 20th anniversary, this community-led project addressed regional recovery from the legacy of Minamata disease. In collaboration with architects, Yanagi reclaimed neglected local sites, transforming them into permanent cultural landmarks and community assets. The project produced Ishidama Garden (2021), an installation of cracked stones in a Ginkgo grove from which faint voices emanate, echoing the local history and literature of Michiko Ishimure. It also established Nyukon House (2022), a project that transformed a former school swimming pool into a guesthouse. The entire site operates as an immersive architectural artwork, weaving Ishimure's poetry and historical photography by W. Eugene and Aileen M. Smith directly into the fabric of its physical design.
- Anjwa Island Project / Floating Museum (2018–present): This international initiative, located in Shinan County, South Korea, focuses on the reclamation of neglected coastal landscapes. The project centers on a "Floating Museum" design on Anjwa Island, utilizing site-specific installations to address the region's geographical history. It marks an expansion of Yanagi's revitalization methodology—which integrates artwork, architecture, and the environment into a single cohesive experience—into the Korean Peninsula's coastal environment. The design features seven floating cubes representing the continents and local islands, with reflective surfaces that mirror the surrounding landscape. Within these structures, Yanagi permanently installed new editions of his significant artworks, tailored to respond directly to the local environment. These recontextualized pieces engage with the history of the Korean Peninsula and the specific ecology of Anjwa Island, such as its UNESCO-recognized tidal flats and traditional salt fields.

== Selected Exhibitions (2016– ) ==
=== One-Person Exhibitions ===
2016

- YUKINORI YANAGI, Galerie Paris, Yokohama, Japan
- Wandering Position, BankART Studio NYK, Yokohama, Japan

2017

- YUKINORI YANAGI -UNION JACK-, Ticolat Tamura, Hong Kong

2019

- YUKINORI YANAGI, Blum & Poe, Tokyo, Japan
- YUKINORI YANAGI TSUNAGI PROJECT 2019 – Prologue, Tsunagi Art Museum, Kumamoto, Japan

2020

- YUKINORI YANAGI TSUNAGI PROJECT 2020 – Monologue and Dialogue, Tsunagi Art Museum, Kumamoto, Japan

2021

- YUKINORI YANAGI TSUNAGI PROJECT 2021 – Beyond the Epilogue, Tsunagi Art Museum, Kumamoto, Japan
- YUKINORI YANAGI, Blum & Poe, Los Angeles, United States
- Wandering Position 1988–2021, ANOMALY, Tokyo, Japan

2022

- YUKINORI YANAGI, 105MaGALLERY, Kokura, Fukuoka, Japan

2025

- YUKINORI YANAGI: ICARUS, Pirelli HangarBicocca, Milan, Italy

2026

- YUKINORI YANAGI: El Mare Pacificum, Estación MAZ, Guadalajara, Mexico

== Museum and Public Collection ==
- Inujima Seirensho Art Museum (Fukutake Foundation), Okayama, Japan
- The Museum of Art, Kochi, Kochi, Japan
- The National Museum of Art, Osaka, Osaka, Japan
- Takamatsu City Museum of Art, Kagawa, Japan
- The Museum of Contemporary Art, Tokyo, Tokyo, Japan
- The Museum of Modern Art, Tokushima, Tokushima, Japan
- Benesse Holdings, Inc., Okayama, Japan
- Hara Museum, Tokyo, Japan
- Hiroshima City Museum of Contemporary Art, Hiroshima, Japan
- Fukuoka Asian Art Museum, Fukuoka, Japan
- Yokohama Museum of Art, Kanagawa, Japan
- Yamanashi Prefectural Museum of Art, Yamanashi, Japan
- Museum of Modern Art, Shiga, Shiga, Japan
- Tsunagi Art Museum, Kumamoto, Japan
- Okinawa Prefectural Museum & Art Museum, Okinawa, Japan
- Allen Memorial Art Museum, Oberlin College, Ohio, United States
- Virginia Museum of Fine Arts, Richmond, United States
- The Museum of Modern Art (MoMA), New York, United States
- New York Public Library, New York, United States
- Fogg Art Museum, Harvard University, Boston, United States
- Philadelphia Museum of Art, Philadelphia, United States
- The Fabric Workshop and Museum, Philadelphia, United States
- Museum of Fine Arts, Houston, Houston, United States
- List Visual Arts Center, Massachusetts Institute of Technology, Boston, United States
- Zimmerli Art Museum, Rutgers University, New Jersey, United States
- Swiss Bank Corporation, Stamford, Connecticut, United States
- Bowdoin College Museum of Art, Maine, United States
- Rachofsky Collection, Dallas, United States
- Glenstone, Washington, D.C., United States
- National Gallery of Australia, Canberra, Australia
- Queensland Art Gallery, Brisbane, Australia
- Tate Gallery, London, United Kingdom
- Louisiana Museum of Modern Art, Humlebaek, Denmark
- Bayerische Vereinsbank, Munich, Germany
- Museum Moderner Kunst Stiftung Ludwig Wien, Vienna, Austria
- Museum of Modern and Contemporary Art in Nusantara, Jakarta, Indonesia
- MVCA, Riyadh, Saudi Arabia
- O Museum, Bangkok, Thailand

== See also ==
Shimada Yoshiko

Mono-ha

Yukio Mishima

Vito Acconci

Frank Gehry

Soichiro Fukutake

Jasper Jones

Venice Biennale
