= Naoshima Hall =

Building in Naoshima, Japan

- 直島ホール

General information
- Town or city: Naoshima, Kagawa
- Country: Japan
- Coordinates: 34.45936998150133°N 133.99588976060554°E
- Opened: 2015

Design and construction
- Architect(s): Hiroshi Sambuichi

Naoshima Hall (直島ホール) is a building in the Honmura district of Naoshima, an island of Japan, designed by Hiroshima-based Japanese architect Hiroshi Sambuichi. With a footprint of 1,000 square meters, it was built as a venue for the Setouchi Triennale, in anticipation for its 2016 iteration, and has since served as a multipurpose venue for local residents in addition to tourists.

== Design ==
Prior to designing Naoshima Hall, Sambuichi studied the houses of Honmura for two and a half years, specifically how they allow wind to pass through each house, as well as the adjacent houses standing beside them in a grid pattern. Sambuichi thus described the houses of Honmura as "a wind relay settlement," or a giant fan where wind is circulated among houses, rice terraces, and other parts of town. Regarding such a discovery, he considered the ancient wisdom of Honmura's ancestors to be remarkable.

As such, Sambuichi incorporated the town's circulatory elements into Naoshima Hall's design. The building has a cypress roof and is considered one of the largest cypress roofs in the world. The gambrel roof on top of it, made of hinoki wood, has a triangular opening that allows wind to pass into the building through a slit in the ceiling, causing a pressure differential that allows for natural ventilation through updraft.

Meanwhile the building's interior is covered in white shikkui plaster and is considered "the largest continuous surface of this material ever made." A stage occupies the center of its floor, while indoor seating can be shifted to chairs or even tatami as needed, with a seating capacity of up to 300 visitors. Underneath the floor—some of which is hinoki wood, some of which is earth—"air passages" allow breeze to come in to the building and cool it down during the summer. Due to its flexible nature, the building has been used for a number of events, including bunraku puppetry, as well as sports and recreation.

== History ==
Sambuichi was first tapped to design buildings for Naoshima in the early 2000s after Soichiro Fukutake of Fukutake Publishing, who had been buying Naoshima's land for development, encountered his work in Casa Brutus. His first project was the Seirensho Art Museum which was built in 2008 on Inujima, another island of the Seto Inland Sea. Other projects by Sambuichi on Naoshima include the houses Matabe and The Naoshima Plan: The Water.

Shortly before the 2016 Setouchi Triennale, Sambuichi designed, built, and opened Naoshima Hall in the island's Honmura district by 2015.

For Sambuichi's awarding of The Daylight Award in 2018, members of the jury pointed to the Naoshima Hall as an example of Sambuichi's care and consideration of light in architecture: "It sits remarkably compressed within the landscape. As in all his work, Sambuichi's mastery in framing volumes of light is here expressed as a horizontal work of spatial release, converting an intimate moment into an intense collective engagement with the natural world."
