= Fukutake =

Fukutake may refer to:

== People ==
- Hideaki Fukutake (born 1977), Japanese New Zealand businessman
- Soichiro Fukutake (born 1945), Japanese billionaire

== Other ==
- Fukutake Publishing, now Benesse
