= Hiroshi Sambuichi =

Japanese architect

- 三分一 博志
- Born: 1968 (age 57–58); Hiroshima, Japan
- Education: Tokyo University of Science
- Occupation: Architect
- Awards: Architectural Institute of Japan Prize

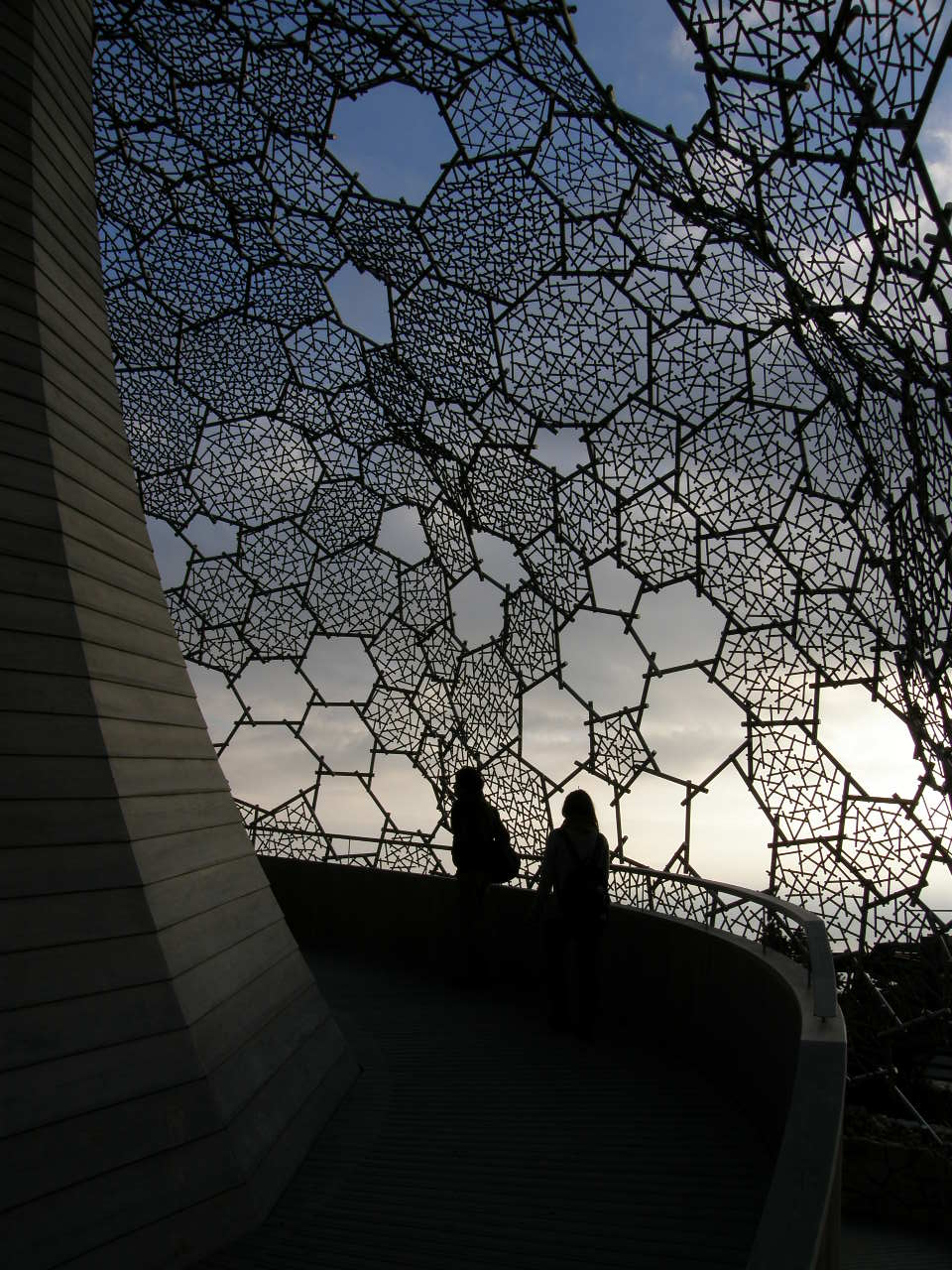
Rokko Observatory garden terrace

Hiroshi Sambuichi is a Hiroshima-based Japanese architect. He has been recognized and awarded for his buildings that combine aesthetic appeal with environmental sustainability in regards to their material composition and functional operation. His projects span various prefectures of Japan, as well as other parts of the world, like Denmark.

In 2017, the editorial team of Designwanted called Sambuichi's firm, Hiroshi Sambuichi Architects, one of ten top architecture firms in the world to know, citing his "unique design philosophy" of making architecture harmonize with nature.

== Themes ==
Sambuichi's architecture considers how to use a minimal amount of resources, as well as producing a minimal amount of waste, especially waste that cannot be recycled. In 2019, he told Wallpaper: "We've reached a stage where we have to pursue an intellectual relationship with the environment. The idea is not to leave any foreign substances in the earth." Such considerations extend not only to the designing and building of a structure but also its hypothetical demolition in the future.

In terms of design, Sambuichi considers "water, wind, and sun" to be the building blocks of architecture, and his designs consider how to utilize and harmonize with them—and nature as a whole—in a tangible sense while also understanding their transience. Before each project, Sambuichi "spends up to two or three years thoroughly researching the terrain, climate and history of the site, before even deciding on the architectural form that he feels would be most suitable"; in the case of Naoshima Hall, Sambuichi spent two and a half years studying the houses of its Honmura district before coming up with a plan for the building.

As such, ArchDaily called Sambuichi an architect whose work is "distinctive not for form or ideation, but for its profound connection to context."

== Early life and education ==
Sambuichi was born in Hiroshima in 1968 and grew up there while also spending time on the islands of the Seto Inland Sea.

Sambuichi attended Tokyo University of Science and moved back to Hiroshima upon graduating where he "was able to develop an unusual sense of aesthetics and architectural philosophy," after which he worked on projects in certain parts of Hiroshima, as well as the islands of the Seto Island Sea per the Benesse Art Site's plans for their redevelopment.

== Career ==
=== Japan ===
After graduating from Tokyo University of Science, Sambuichi worked at Shinichi Ogawa & Architects back in Hiroshima. He then founded his own firm, Hiroshi Sambuichi Architects, in 1997. In addition to his architecture, he also serves as an adjunct professor for the Royal Danish Academy of Fine Arts, as well as a lecturer of Yamaguchi University.

Starting in the 2000s, Sambuichi was tapped to design buildings for Naoshima, an island of Japan, after Soichiro Fukutake of Fukutake Publishing, who had been buying Naoshima's land for development, encountered Sambuichi's work in Casa Brutus. His first project was the Seirensho Art Museum which was built in 2008 on Inujima, another island of the Seto Inland Sea. Other projects by Sambuichi on Naoshima include the houses Matabe and The Naoshima Plan: The Water, as well as the multi-purpose building Naoshima Hall.

=== Denmark ===
In 2017, Sambuichi temporarily transformed an underground reservoir part of the Cisternerne in Copenhagen, Denmark, for an exhibition called The Water, which showed until February 2018. Sambuichi's first project outside of Japan, it had been planned ever since the Japanese architect met Cisternerne director Astrid la Cour in 2015.

Following its unveiling, la Cour made plans for Sambuichi to permanently expand the venue as a whole, specifically through a newly discovered "fourth chamber" of the Cisternerne that Sambuichi intended to excavate and renovate by creating a pond criss-crossed with wood and overlaid with glass to permit natural light within.

== Awards ==
In 2011, Sambuichi was awarded the Architectural Institute of Japan Prize for the Seirensho Art Museum on Inujima.

In 2018, Sambuichi won The Daylight Award for his consideration of light in design. The jury stated:

Sambuichi's work, in such projects as the Miyajima Misen Observatory and Hiroshima Orizuru Tower, constantly explores the thin film of space which we occupy on earth—a sliver of tactility, the richness of an intimate ecology. This awareness of the narrow band of topography, our sedimentary layer of life, with the weight of time below coupled with the weightlessness of time above us, is the world revealed by his work.

== Projects ==
Building/project	Location	Country	Date	Ref
Air House	Yamaguchi	Japan		
Sloping North House	Yamaguchi	Japan		
Dental clinic	Hiroshima	Japan		
Stone House	Hiroshima	Japan		
Hiroshima Hill	Hiroshima	Japan		
Seirensho Art Museum	Inujima	Japan	2008	
Rokko Shidare Observatory	Kobe	Japan	2010	
Naoshima Hall	Naoshima	Japan	2015	
The Water	Copenhagen	Denmark	2017	
Cisternerne (expansion)	Copenhagen	Denmark		
Base Valley House	Hiroshima	Japan		
