= Ando Museum =

Museum in Naoshima, Japan

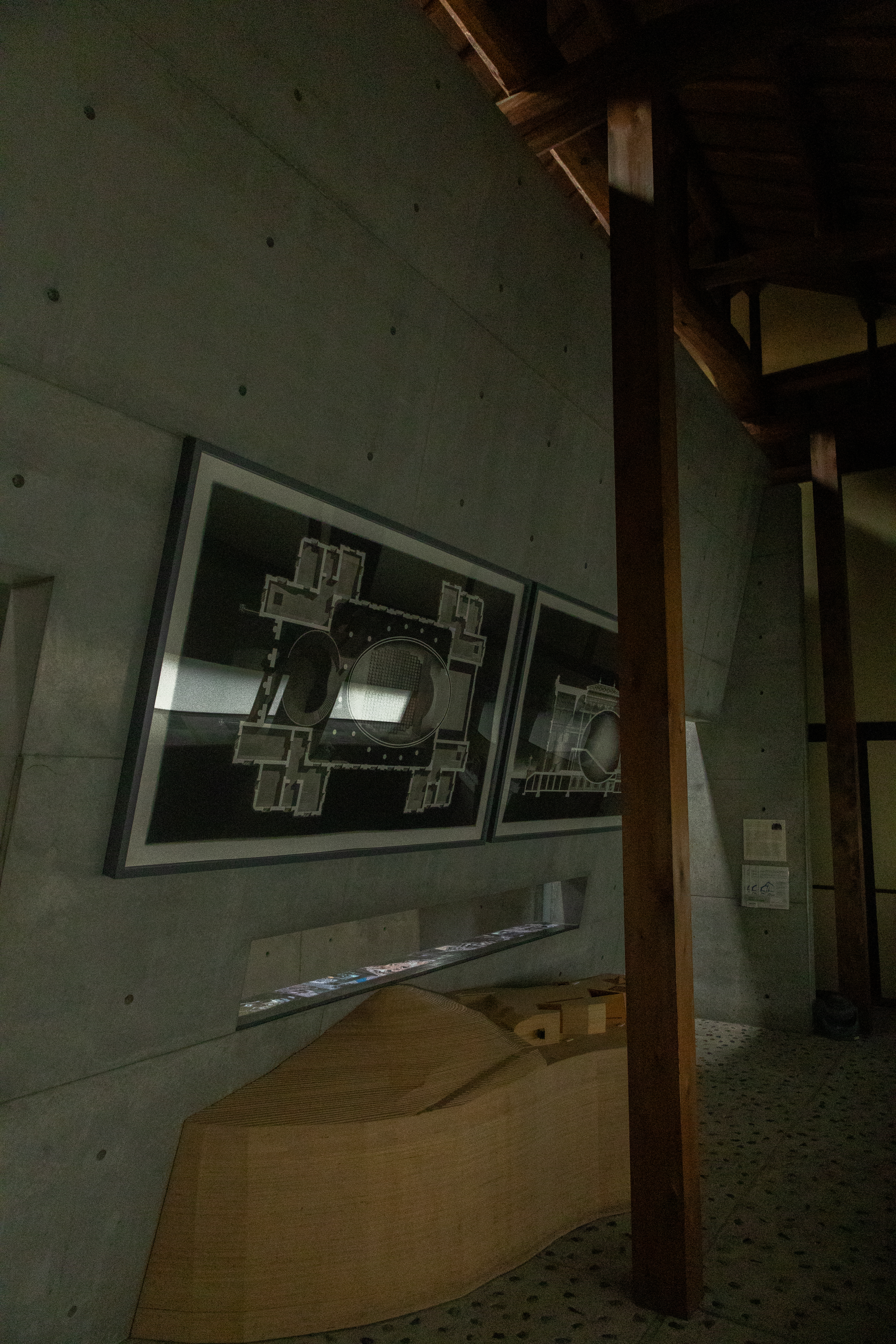
- Inside of the museum
- Interactive map of the Ando Museum area

General information
- Location: 本村736-2 〒761-3110, Naoshima, Kagawa, Japan
- Coordinates: 34.459425273428835°N 133.9970343270307°E
- Opened: March 12, 2013

Design and construction
- Architect: Tadao Ando

The Ando Museum is a museum on Naoshima, an island of Japan, which showcases the history of Japanese architect Tadao Ando and Naoshima as a whole. One of Ando's many designed buildings on the island, it is housed in a century-old "traditional wooden house" with a concrete interior of his design.

== History ==
In renovating a century-old house in the Honmura Area of Naoshima, Ando preserved its traditional exterior made of wood, but placed a concrete structure inside of it, as a means of establishing oppositions between past and present, light and dark, wood and concrete.

Following its completion, a press preview for the Ando Museum's unveiling was held on March 9, 2013, during which Soichiro Fukutake of the Fukutake Foundation stated that the museum was a culmination of the idea that art should create that which does not yet exist, rather than destroying or overwriting what exists.

A few days later, the Ando Museum opened on March 12, 2013. Since then, it has shown Ando's photographs, models, and drawings kept throughout his career as an architect. In line with Ando's architectural style, however, the building is intended to be an experience unto itself, rather than simply the space within which other experiences, such an exhibition, are contained.
