= Yuko Hasegawa (curator) =

Japanese art curator and professor (born 1957)

- Born: 1957 (age 68–69); Hyogo Prefecture, Japan
- Education: Kyoto University; Tokyo University of Fine Arts and Music
- Occupation: Art curator
- Title: Director, 21st Century Museum of Contemporary Art, Kanazawa; Professor, Tokyo University of the Arts, Graduate School of Global Arts
- Honours: Japan Commissioner for Cultural Affairs Award, Japan (2020) Ordem de Rio Branco, Brazil (2017) Chevalier de l'Ordre des Arts et des Lettres, France (2016)
- Website: http://yukohasegawa.jp/

Yuko Hasegawa (長谷川祐子, Hasegawa Yuko, born 1957) is the director of the 21st Century Museum of Contemporary Art, Kanazawa and professor of curatorial and art theory at Tokyo University of the Arts.

== Early life and education ==
Hasegawa was born in Hyogo Prefecture, Japan and graduated from Kyoto University with a Bachelor of Arts in law, and from Tokyo University of the Arts with a Master of Fine Arts in art history.

== Career ==
Hasegawa's past positions include and Chief Curator of the Museum of Contemporary Art, Tokyo from 2006 to 2020 and Chief Curator and Founding Artistic Director of the 21st Century Museum of Contemporary Art, Kanazawa from 1999 to 2006. Hasegawa was a board member of Hong Kong's West Kowloon Cultural District Authority from 2009 to 2011, and has remained a member of the Asian Art Council at the Solomon R. Guggenheim Museum in New York since 2008. She is also a member of the Istanbul Biennale Advisory Board.

Hasegawa is known for her work in various biennales including the 7th Moscow Biennale (Curator, 2017), 11th Sharjah Biennale (Curator, 2013), 12th Venice Biennale of Architecture (Artistic Advisor, 2010), the 29th São Paulo Biennale (Co-Curator, 2010), the 4th Seoul International Media Art Biennale (Co-Curator, 2006), and the 7th Istanbul Biennial (Curator, 2001).

Her recently curated exhibitions include Feminisms (2022), looking at pluralistic feminisms through the lens of contemporary art since the 1990s at 21st Century Museum of Contemporary Art, Kanazawa, "Olafur Eliasson: Sometimes the river is the bridge" (2020) at 21st Century Museum of Contemporary Art, Kanazawa, Fukami: A Plunge into Japanese aesthetics at Hotel Salmon de Rothschild, Paris (2018), Japanorama: New Vision on Art Since 1970 at Centre Pompidou-Metz (2017), and Kishio Suga: Situations at Pirelli Hangar Bicocca, Milan (2016). She is also the artistic director of the Inujima Art House Project.

Hasegawa was a member of the juries that selected Doris Salcedo (2019) for the Nomura Art Award; and Salcedo (2016), Isa Genzken (2019), Michael Rakowitz (2020), Senga Nengudi (2023), Otobong Nkanga (2024) and Petrit Halilaj (2027) for the Nasher Prize.

== Other activities ==
- Istanbul Biennale, Member of the Advisory Board

== Exhibitions ==
=== Japan ===
- "Beyond the Photographic Frame" Art Tower Mito, Ibaraki, Japan (1990)
- "Christian Boltanski" Art Tower Mito, Ibaraki; ICA, Aichi, Japan (1990–91)
- "Another World" Art Tower Mito, Ibaraki, Japan (1992–93)
- "Cai Guo Qiang- Chaos" Setagaya Art Museum, Tokyo (1994)
- "Richard Long-Sangyo Suigyo" Setagaya Art Museum, Tokyo. Traveled to National Museum of Modern Art, Kyoto. Co-Curated with Shinji Komoto (1996)
- "Join Me" Spiral, Wacoal Art Center, Tokyo (1996)
- "De-Genderism-detruire dit-élle /il （Art and Gender） " Setagaya Art Museum, Tokyo (1997)
- "James Turrell -Where does the light in our dreams come from?" Setagaya Art Museum, Saitama Prefectural Museum, Nagoya City Art Museum (1997–98)
- "Shirin Neshat: 9th part of Previous-Opening Event of Contemporary Art Museum, Kanazawa" Kanazawa Citizens' Art Center, Japan (2001)
- "21st Century Museum of Contemporary Art, Kanazawa Opening exhibition: The encounters in the 21st Century: Polyphony – Emerging Resonances" 21st Century Museum of Contemporary Art, Kanazawa, Japan (2004–05)
- "Matthew Barney: Drawing Restraint" 21st Century Museum of Contemporary Art, Kanazawa, Japan. Traveled to Leeum, Samsung Museum of Art, Korea and the San Francisco Museum of Modern Art (SFMOMA), USA. (2005)
- "Qiu Anxiong Exhibition" Museum of Contemporary Art Tokyo(MOT), Tokyo, Japan (2007)
- "Marlene Dumas – Broken White" Museum of Contemporary Art Tokyo(MOT), Tokyo, Japan (2007)
- "SPACE FOR YOUR FUTURE – Recombining the DNA of Art and Design" Museum of Contemporary Art Tokyo(MOT), Tokyo, Japan (2007–08)
- "Daido Moriyama and Miguel Rio Branco Photographic Exhibition: A Quiet Gaze, Echoing Worlds" Museum of Contemporary Art Tokyo (MOT), Tokyo, Japan (2008–09)
- "When lives Become Form Contemporary Brazilian Art: 1960s to the Present" Museum of Contemporary Art Tokyo (MOT), Tokyo, Japan. Traveled to the Yerba Buena Center, San Francisco (2008–09)
- "Ryoji Ikeda +/－[the infinite between 0 and 1]" Museum of Contemporary Art Tokyo (MOT), Tokyo, Japan (2009)
- "Rebecca Horn" Museum of Contemporary Art Tokyo (MOT), Tokyo, Japan. Co-Curated with Naoko Seki (2009–10)
- "A Tokyo Culture Creation Project: Luxury in fashion Reconsidered: Special Exhibition: Kazuyo Sejima Spatial Design for Comme des Garçons" Museum of Contemporary Art Tokyo (MOT), Tokyo, Japan. Traveled to Yerba Buena Center for the Arts, San Francisco, U.SA (2009–10)
- "Art Immacure- Le principe d'esperance" （Outsider art）" CCAA Art Plaza, Tokyo, Japan. Co-Curated with Shinichi Nakazawa (2010)
- "Hussein Chalayan – from fashion and back" Museum of Contemporary Art Tokyo (MOT), Tokyo, Japan (2010)
- "Tokyo Art Meeting: "Transformation" （Art and Anthoropology）" Museum of Contemporary Art Tokyo (MOT), Tokyo, Japan. Co-Curated with Shinichi Nakazawa (anthropologist) (2010-11)
- "Berlin 2000-2011: Playing among the Ruins" Museum of Contemporary Art Tokyo (MOT), Tokyo, Japan. Co-Curated with Angela Rosenberg (2011–12)
- "Tokyo Art Meeting II: Architectural Environments for Tomorrow – New Spatial Practices in Architecture and Art（Art and architecture）" Museum of Contemporary Art Tokyo (MOT), Tokyo, Japan. Co-Curated with SANAA (2011–12)
- "Atsuko Tanaka – The Art of Connecting" Museum of Contemporary Art Tokyo (MOT), Tokyo, Japan. Traveled to the Espai d'art contemporani de Castelló, Valencia, Spain, and Ikon Gallery, Birmingham, U.K. Co-Curated with Jonathan Watkins(director of IKON gallery) (2012)
- "Thomas Demand" Museum of Contemporary Art Tokyo (MOT), Tokyo, Japan (2012)
- "Tokyo Art Meeting III: Art and Music – Search for New Synthesia" Museum of Contemporary Art Tokyo (MOT), Tokyo, Japan. General Advisor: Ryuichi Sakamoto (2012–13)
- "Tokyo Art Meeting IV: BUNNY SMASH — design to touch the world （Art and Design）" Museum of Contemporary Art Tokyo (MOT), Tokyo, Japan. Co-Curated with Hiroshi Kashiwagi '(design critic): Taku Satoh (designer) and Hiroshi Ishii Media (artist MIT) (2013–14)
- "The Marvelous Real – Contemporary Spanish and Latin American Art from The MUSAC Collection" Museum of Contemporary Art Tokyo (MOT), Tokyo, Japan (2014)
- "Tokyo Art Meeting V: Seeking New Genealogies Bodies/Leaps/Traces（Art and Performance）" Museum of Contemporary Art Tokyo (MOT), Tokyo, Japan. General Advisor：Mansai Nomura (2014–15)
- "KISHIO SUGA – SITUATED LATENCY" Museum of Contemporary Art Tokyo (MOT), Tokyo, Japan. Co-Curated with Naoko Seki (2015)
- "Gabriel Orozco – Inner Cycles" Museum of Contemporary Art Tokyo (MOT), Tokyo, Japan (2015)
- "Oscar Niemeyer The Man Who Built Brasilia: Solo exhibition One of the most important Brazilian architect" Museum of Contemporary Art Tokyo (MOT), Tokyo, Japan (2015)
- "Tokyo Art Meeting VI: TOKYO – Sensing the Cultural Magma of the Metropolis" Museum of Contemporary Art Tokyo (MOT), Tokyo, Japan (2015–16)
- "Dumb Type | Actions + Reflections" Museum of Contemporary Art Tokyo (MOT), Tokyo, Japan (2019–20)
- "Olafur Eliasson: Sometimes the river is the bridge" Museum of Contemporary Art Tokyo (MOT), Tokyo, Japan (2020)
- "rhizomatiks_multiplex" Museum of Contemporary Art Tokyo (MOT), Tokyo, Japan (2020)
- "Kacchu Anatomy : The aesthetics of design and engineering", 21st Century Museum of Contemporary Art, Kanazawa, (2022)

=== Other countries ===
- "Liquid Crystal Futures; 11 Contemporary Japanese Photography" Fruitsmarket Gallery, Edinburgh; Charlottenbourg Udstilingsbygning, Copenhagen; Spiral, Wacoal Art center, Tokyo; Neue Gesellschaft fur Bildende Kunst, Berlin; Mucsarnok Palace of Art, Budapest; Kunsthallen Goteborg, Sweden. Co-curated with Shinji Komoto (1994–96)
- "Fancy Dance A show of 13 Contemporary Japanese Artists after 90's" Sonje Art Museum, Kyonju, Sonje Art Center, Seoul (1999)
- "7th International Istanbul Biennial" Istanbul, Turkey (2001)
- "Shanghai Biennale 2002" Shanghai, China (2002–03)
- "Venice Biennale 2003, 50th International Exhibition of Art, Japan Pavilion" Venice, Italy (2003)
- "SUMMER 2006 INTERNATIONAL ARTIST-IN-RESIDENCE PROGRAM" Art Space San Antonio, Texas (2006)
- "Trial Balloons: Group exhibition featuring 64 emerging global artists" Museo de Arte Contemporáneo de Castilla y León (MUSAC), Spain. Co-Curated with Agustin Perez Rubio and Octavio Zaya (2006)
- "Sensorium: Embodied Experience, Technology, and Contemporary Art" MIT List Visual Arts Center, Boston, USA. Co-curated Bill Arning, Jane Farver, Marjory Jacobson and Caroline A. Jones (2006)
- "The 4th Seoul International Media Art Biennale: Dual Realistic" Seoul Museum of Art and public sites around Seoul, Korea. Co-Curated with Rhee Wonil, Pi Li (2006)
- "When Lives Become Form – Dialogue with the Future Brazil / Japan" Museu de Arte Moderna de São Paulo (MAM) (2008)
- "A Blow to the Everyday" Osage Gallery Limited, Hong Kong (2009)
- "The 12th Venice Architecture Biennale: People meet in architecture" Artistic Advisor (collaborate with Director: Kazuyo Sejima) (2010)
- "The 29th Sao Paulo Biennial: Art and Politics" São Paulo, Brazil. Co-Curated with Rina Carvajal, Sarat Maharaj, Fernando Alvim, Chus Martínez (2010)
- "Trans-Cool Tokyo – Contemporary Japanese Art from MOT Collection" Travelling to Singapore Art Museum, Bangkok Art Culture Center and Taipei Fine Art Museum (2011–12)
- "Art Basel 2014 Encounters" Hong Kong (2012)
- "The 11th Sharjah Art Biennial: Re Emerge – Toward a New Cultural Cartography" Sharjah, UAE (2013)
- "Art Basel in Hong Kong Encounters" Hong Kong (2014)
- "A Retrospective Curated by SUPERFLEX" Kunsthal Charlottenborg, Copenhagen. Co-Curated Eungie Joo, Toke Lykkeberg, Daniel McClean and Lisa Rosendahl, Adriano Pedrosa, Agustin Perez Rubio, Hilde Teerlinck, and Rirkrit Tiravanija (2013–14)
- "Unfamiliar Asia: The Second Beijing Photo Biennial 2015" CAFA Art Museum, Beijing, China. Co-curated with Huangsheng Wang, Chunchen Wang, Wai Chun and others (2015)
- "Breaking through to the actual via the imagination ---Long museum collection show" Long Museum, Shanghai, China (2015–16)
- "New Sensorium – Exiting Failures of Modernization" ZKM / Center for Art and Media, Karlsruhe, Germany (2016)
- "Kishio Suga: Situations: Solo exhibition: a famous Japanese MONO-HA artist called Kishio Suga" Pirelli HangarBicocca, Milan, Italy. Co-curated with Vicente Todolí (director of Pirelli HangarBicocca) (2016–17)
- "Japanorama: A NEW VISION ON ART ART SINCE 1970" Centre Pompidou-Metz, Metz, France (2017–18)
- "7th International Moscow Biennale: Clouds ⇄Forests" The State Tretyakov Gallery, Russia (2017–18)
- "Saudade: Unmemorable Place in Time" Fosun Foundation, Shanghai (2018)
- "Fukami: A Plunge into Japanese aesthetics" Salomon de Rothschild Hotel, Paris (2018)
- "Saudade: Unmemorable Place in Time" Museu Colecção Berardo, Lisbon (2018–19)
- "Sharjapan: The Poetics of Space" Al Hamriyah Studios, Sharjah, UAE (2018–19)
- "Francis Alÿs – La dépense" Rockbund Art Museum, Shanghai (2018–19)
- "Intimate Distance: the masterpieces of the Ishikawa Collection" Montpellier Contemporain, Montpellier, France (2019)
- "Desire: A revision from the 20th century to the digital age" Irish Museum of Modern Art, Co-curated with Rachael Thomas, Dublin. (2019–20)
- "Sharjapan : Inter-Resonance | Inter-Organics: Japanese Performance and Sound Art" Sharjah Art Foundation, UAE (2019–20)
- "SYMBIOSIS : The Lived Island", Japan House São Paulo,(2021-2022)
- "Sharjapan: Remain Calm | Solitude and Connectivity in Japanese Architecture" Sharjah Art Foundation, UAE (2021)
- "Thailand Biennale, Korat 2021 | Butterflies Frolicking on the Mud: Engendering Sensible Capital" Contemporary Art and Culture (OCAC), Co-curated with Seiha Kurosawa, Vipash Purichanont and Tawatchai Somkong, Thailand (2021-2022)

== Publications ==
- "Grotesque and Cruel Imagery in Japanese Gender Expression: Nobuyoshi Araki, Makoto Aida and Fuyuko Matsui" in The Persistence of Taste: Art, Museums and Everyday Life After Bourdieu (2018), ed. Malcolm Quinn, Dave Beech, Michael Lehnert, Carol Tulloch, Stephen Wilson. London: Routledge
- "New Sensorium: Exiting from Failures of Modernization" in GLOBALE: New Sensorium (2016). Berlin: ZKM
- "Emotional Minimalism – Yet Seeking New Modernity" in Xavier Veilhan (2015) with Andrew Berardini. Paris: Galerie Perrotin, Editions Dilecta
- "Performativity in the Work of Female Japanese Artists in the 1950s-1960s and 1990s" in Modern Women: Women Artists at the Museum of Modern Art (2010), ed. Cornelia Butler, Alexandra Schwartz. New York: Museum of Modern Art
- Kazuyo Sejima + Ryue Nishizawa: SANAA (2006). London: Phaidon Press
- "Polyphony," "Lee Bul, interviewed by Yuko Hasegawa," and "Matthew Barney, interviewed by Yuko Hasegawa" in Polyphony: Emerging Resonances (2005). Kanazawa: 21st Century Museum of Contemporary Art and Tankosha Publishing Co., Ltd.
- "What is a 21st century art museum? An attempted answer" in A Museum for the New Century: The Vision and Innovation of the 21st Century Museum of Contemporary Art, Kanazawa (2004), ed. Kiyoshi Kusumi, Mari Nakayama, Tamaki Harada, Yuko Hasegawa, Misato Fudo, Chieko Kitade. Tokyo: Bijutsu Shuppan-Sha, Ltd.
- "When lives Become Form Contemporary Brazilian Art: 1960s to the Present" (2008) Esquire Magazine Japan Co., Ltd.
- "Luxury in Fashion Reconsidered" (2009) The Kyoto Costume Institute
- "Performativity in the Work of Female Japanese Artists In the 1950s-1960s and the 1990s" in Modern Women: Women Artists at the Museum of Modern Art. (2010) Museum of Modern Art
- "Tokyo Art Meeting: Transformation" (2010) Access Co., Ltd.
- "Tokyo Art Meeting II: Architectural Environments for Tomorrow – New Spatial Practices in Architecture and Art" (2011) Access Co., Ltd.
- "Trans-Cool Tokyo" (2011) Chia Shin Printing Co., Ltd., Taipei
- "Tokyo Art Meeting III: Art & Music – Search for New Synesthesia" (2012) Film Art Inc.
- "A Retrospective Curated by XXXXXXXXX" (2013) Binding: Rosendahls-Schultz
- "Sharjah Biennial 11: Re:emerge: towards a new cultural cartography" (2013)Sharjah Art Foundation
- "Tetsuya Ishida" (2013) Gagosian Gallery
- "Tokyo Art Meeting IV: Bunny Smash –Design to Touch the World" (2013) Film Art Inc.
- "Tokyo Art Meeting V: Seeking New Genealogies: Art/Bodies/Performances" (2014) Film Art Inc.
- "Thoughts on Kishio Suga, Kishio Suga Situated Latency" (2015) HeHe
- "Xavier Veilhan, Emotional Mnimalism – Yet Seeking New Modernity" (2015) Galerie Perrotin, Editions Dilecta
- "Gabriel Orozco – Inner Cycles" (2015) Film Art Inc.
- "Jan Fabre: Tribute to Hieronymus Bosch in Congo" (2015) Espace Louis Vuitton Tokyo
- "Tokyo Art Meeting VI: "TOKYO" – Sensing the Cultural Magma of the Metropolis" (2015) Seigensha Art Publishing, Inc.
- "Destroy, They Say: Women Artists Subtly Traversing Boundaries" (2017) Tokyo Geidai Press
- "Japanorama: Un Archipel en Perpétuel Changement" in Japanorama. (2017) Edition du Centre Pompidou Metz,
- "Grotesque and cruel imagery in Japanese gender expression – Nobuyoshi Araki, Makoto Aida and Fuyuko Matsui" in The Persistence of Taste – Art, Museums and Everyday Life After Bourdieu. (2018) Routledge
- "Saudade: Unmemorable Place in Time." (2018) Fosun Foundation
- "Fukami: The Expression of Life and Liveliness in Japanese Aesthetics" in Fukami: immersion in the art and aesthetics of Japan. (2019) Flammarion
- "The Dumb Type effect, 1984 to the present" in "DUMB TYPE 1984 2019" (2019) Kawade Shobo Shinsha
- "Inter-Resonance: Inter-Organics" in "Sharjapan – Inter-Resonance: Inter-Organics" (2019) Sharjah Art Foundation
- "Die Kraft der Allegorie" in "ARCH+" (2020) ARCH+
- "Olafur Eliasson, the artist who listens no the future: Arts as the practice of ecology" in "Olafur Eliasson: Sometimes the river is the bridge" (2020) Film Art Inc.
- "A New Ecology and Art: on the Clouds⇄Forests exhibition" in "Journal of Global Arts Studies and Curatorial Practices vol. 1" (2020) Tokyo University of the Arts
- "Un Autre Vide" in "Le Ciel Comme Atelier Yves Klein et ses Contemporaines" (2020) Editions du Centre Pompidou-Metz
