= Hideaki Fukutake =

Japanese New Zealand businessman and arts patron

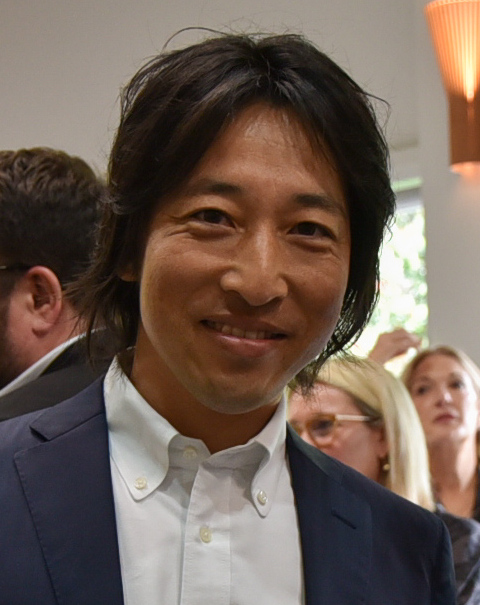
Hideaki Fukutake, 2020

Hideaki Fukutake (born c. 1977) is a Japanese New Zealand businessman and arts patron, based in New Zealand since 2009. He is CEO of New Zealand company STILL that is focused on New Zealand-based opportunities to enhance art, culture and community through business, social enterprise and projects. He is a Director of Benesse Holdings in Japan and Chairman of the Fukutake Foundation which operates Benesse Art Site Naoshima and is an important contributor to the Setouchi Triennale.

== Early years ==
He is the son of Japanese billionaire Soichiro Fukutake. He was raised in Okayama, Japan and attended Chuo University where he studied a Bachelors of Commerce.

== Family ==
Fukutake is married with three children, and lives in Auckland, New Zealand, following moving to the country in 2009.

Fukutake's family is known for creating the Benesse Art Site and for revitalising Naoshima, Teshima and Inujima islands in the Seto Inland Sea, which were polluted by copper refineries emitting sulphur dioxide and by illegally dumped industrial waste.

== Career ==
Fukutake is a director of Benesse Holdings, Japan, a company founded by his grandfather, and previously worked at Japanese companies SMS Corporation and Keyence Corporation.

In 2020, he set up a New Zealand company STILL with the mission to acquire or start 100 New Zealand businesses that are fundamentally good for New Zealand. STILL's interest is companies that enhance art, culture and community and is an intergenerational organisation with a long term outlook.

== Current Interests ==
=== STILL ===
STILL is a group of New Zealand companies including the World of Wearable Art, SHAPE Energy, National Candles, design agency DDMMYY, Queenstown's Hulbert House Hotel, Consult Recruitment, and Auckland's Metro magazine. STILL's urban green division owns the nursery King's Plant Barn, No More Boring workspace design and office plant supplier, Awa Nursery and Humphreys Landscaping.

=== Benesse Corporation ===
His grandfather Tetsuhiko Fukutake founded a publishing company called Fukutake Publishing Co. in the 1950s focusing on education and correspondence. The company later developed simulated exams and correspondence courses and became successful in the field of education. Following Tetsuhiko's death in 1986, his son Soichiro Fukutake, took over the business. The company's name was changed to Benesse Corporation in 1990 taking the Latin words bene (well) and esse (being). The company's mission is to support people's well-being over the generations. In 2023, Fukutake announced the intention to privatise the company via a management buyout with Swedish investment house EQT.

=== Fukutake Foundation ===
In 2012 Soichiro Fukutake and his family gifted 5.2% of Benesse stock to launch the foundation which was raised to 8% in 2020. Hideaki Fukutake is expected to take over the foundation.
