= Anjwa-myeon =

- Township
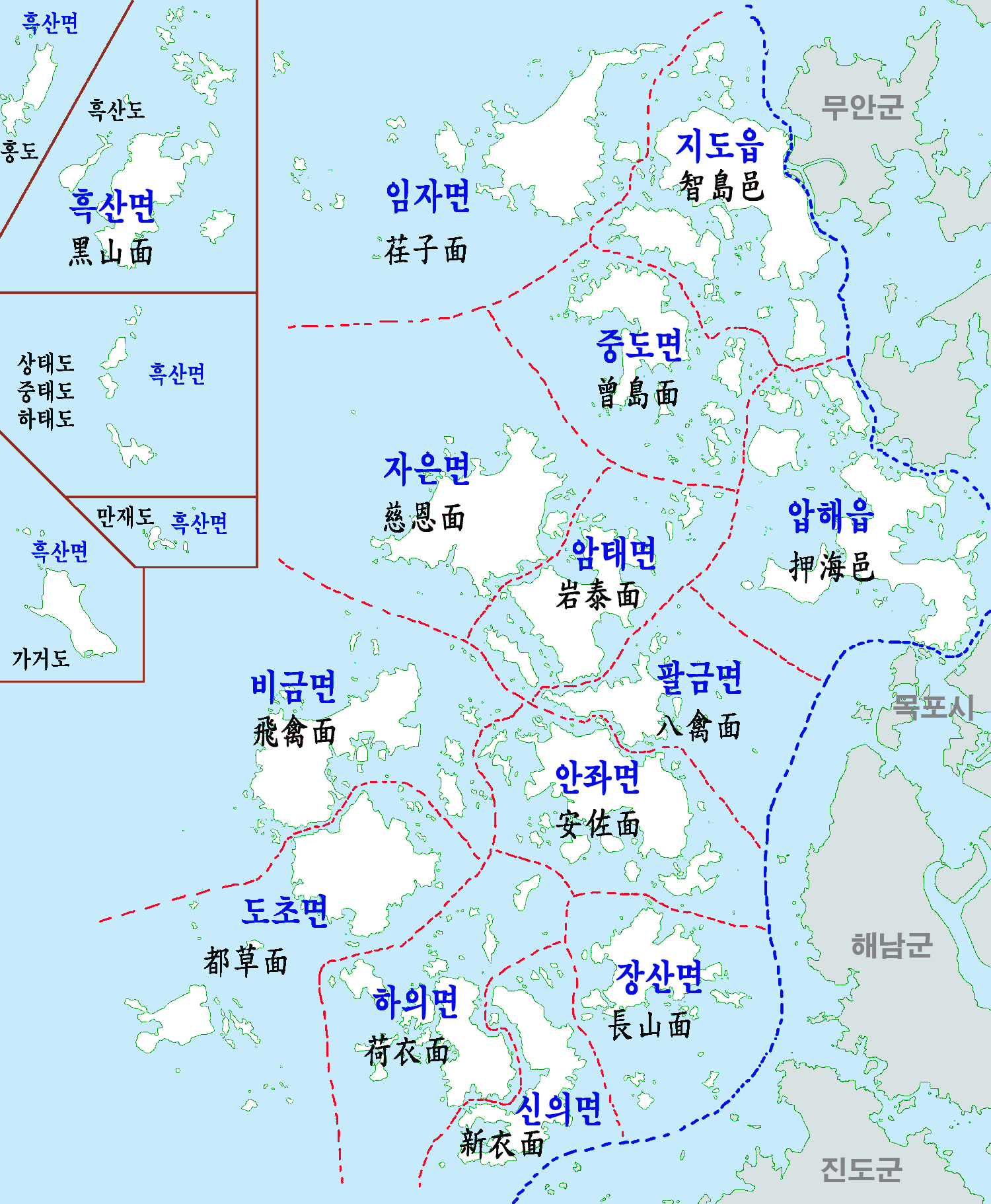
- Position of Anjwa-myeon in the south-central region of Shinan County

- Location within South Korea
- Coordinates: 34.7307°N 126.1316°E
- Country: South Korea
- Province: South Jeolla
- County: Shinan County

Area
  - Land: 59.97 km^{2} (23.15 sq mi)

Population (March 2022)
  - Total: 3,071
  - Density: 51.21/km^{2} (132.6/sq mi)
- Time zone: UTC+9 (Korea Standard Time)

Korean name
- Hangul: 안좌면
- Hanja: 安佐面
- RR: Anjwa-myeon
- MR: Anjwa-myŏn

Anjwa-myeon (Korean: 안좌면) is a myeon located in Shinan County, South Jeolla, South Korea. It has an area of 59.97 km^{2} and its population in March 2022 was 3,071. The myeon is composed of 63 islands, 10 inhabited and 53 uninhabited. Its largest island is Anjwa Island (안좌도; 安佐島 which comprises the majority of its land area. This island is also the largest island of Shinan County. Its northern coast is connected by a bridge to neighboring Palgeum-myeon, while to west of the island lies Bigeum-myeon. To the southwest of the myeon lies Haui-myeon, whilst Jangsan-myeon lies to its southeast.

== History ==
Anjwa Island itself was reclaimed from mudflats in 1917. Before then, it consisted of two islands, Anchang Island (안창도; Anchang-do) to the west and Gijwa Island (Korean: 기좌도; Hanja: 基佐島; RR: Gijwa-do) to the east. The modern name of the island is formed as a portmanteau of these two names.

=== Administrative history ===
- Three Kingdoms period: Mura County (물아군), Baekje
- Joseon period: Najumok Jurisdiction (나주목 관할)
- 1896: Gijwa-myeon and Anchang-myeon, Jido County (지도군)
- 1903: Gijwa-myeon and Anchang-myeon, Jindo County (진도군)
- 1914: Gijwa-myeon and Anchang-myeon, Muan County (무안군)
- 1917: Anjwa-myeon, Muan County
- 1969: Anjwa-myeon, Shinan County (신안군)

== Geography ==
The three highest points of the myeon and of Anjwa Island are marked by Bongsan (봉산; 鳳山) at a height of 182m in the northwest of the island, and Daesan (대산) at 151m and Hudongsan (후동산) also at 151m, in the southeast.

The geology of the islands is principally that of acidic igneous rock. However, due to the sedimentation caused by coastal currents as well as governmental land reclamation projects, along the eastern coast of Anjwa Island a plain has formed. The native tree flora include a species of evergreen oak, camellia, evergreen spindle, and red machilus.

=== Administrative subdivisions ===
Anjwa-myeong has 25 ri.

Name of Ri	Korean name of 리	Hanja name	Village names (Administrative ri)	Notes
Geumsan-ri	금산리	琴山里	금산 (Geumsan)	On Anjwa Island
Tandong-ri	탄동리	炭洞里	탄동 (Tandong)	On Anjwa Island
Sandu-ri	산두리	山斗里	산두 (Sandu)	On Anjwa Island
Bokho-ri	복호리	伏虎里	복호 (Bokho)	On Anjwa Island
Dae-ri	대리	大里	대리 (Daeri)	On Anjwa Island
Jara-ri	자라리	者羅里	자라1, 자라2 (Jara-1, Jara-2)	Comprises Jara Island, Jeungsan Island (증산도) and Hyu'am Island (휴암도), as well as some smaller islands
Jonpo-ri	존포리	存浦里	존포 (Jonpo)	Comprises Banggu Island (방구도) and part of Anjwa Island
Hyangmok-ri	향목리	香木里	향목 (Hyangmok)	On Anjwa Island
Yeoheul-ri	여흘리	如屹里	여흘 (Yeoheul)	On Anjwa Island
Namgang-ri	남강리	南江里	남강 (Namgang)	On Anjwa Island
Daecheok-ri	대척리	大尺里	대척 (Daecheok)	On Anjwa Island
Changma-ri	창마리	唱馬里	창마 (Changma)	On Anjwa Island
Sogok-ri	소곡리	所谷里	소곡, 두리 (Sogok, Duri)	On Anjwa Island
Bakji-ri	박지리	朴只里	박지 (Bakji)	Comprises Bakji Island, one of the Purple Islands
Banwol-ri	반월리	半月里	반월 (Banwol)	Comprises Banwol Island, one of the Purple Islands
Gudae-ri	구대리	舊垈里	구대, 우목 (Gudae, Umok)	On Anjwa Island
Mamyeong-ri	마명리	馬鳴里	마명 (Mamyeong)	On Anjwa Island
Sinchon-ri	신촌리	新川里	신촌 (Sinchon)	On Anjwa Island
Dae-u-ri	대우리	大芋里	대우 (Dae'u)	On Anjwa Island
Bangwol-ri	방월리	方月里	방월, 전진 (Bang'wol, Jeonjin)	On Anjwa Island. Site of the Stone Tombs, a set of dolmens.
Naeho-ri	내호리	內湖里	내호 (Naeho)	On Anjwa Island
Han'un-ri	한운리	閑雲里	한운, 사치 (Han'un, Sachi)	Comprises the Upper and Lower Sachi Islands (사치도) and part of Anjwa Island
Siseo-ri	시서리	枾西里	시서, 오동 (Siseo, Odong)	On Anjwa Island
Eupdong-ri	읍동리	邑洞里	읍동, 와우 (Eupdong, Wau)	On Anjwa Island; location of the Administrative Welfare Center
Majin-ri	마진리	馬津里	마진 (Majin)	On Anjwa Island

== Economy ==
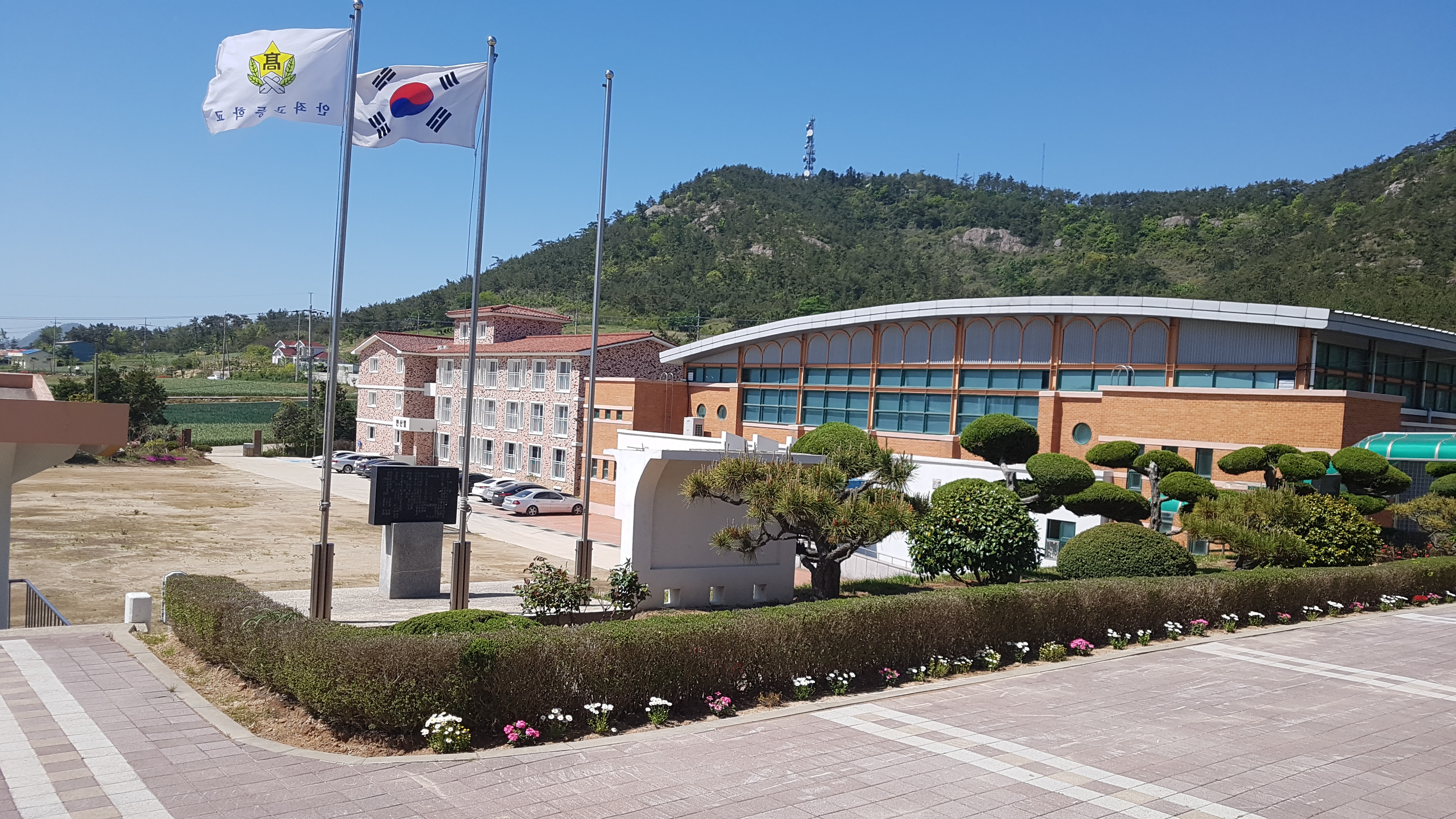
Anjwa Middle School

Land use is composed of 10.12 square kilometres (3.91 mi^{2}) of rice paddies, 11.61 square kilometres (4.48 mi^{2}) of agricultural fields, and 16.37 square kilometres (6.32 mi^{2}) of forest. Major agricultural products include rice, barley, beans, sweet potatoes, tobacco, and onions; additionally, jujubes are abundant as forest products. Anchovies, cutlassfish, octopus (including nakji and larger species), and croaker are caught in the coastal waters. Production of oysters, gim seaweed, miyeok seaweed and salt are all active industries; local specialties include garlic, gim seaweed, rice and gamtae (also known as paddle weed).

=== Transportation ===
Regular passenger ferries link Anjwa-myeon to Mokpo on the mainland of South Korea, as well as between the islands that make up the myeon. There are also road bridges that connect Anjwa Island to other myeon, with Local Route 805 being the principal trunk road leading out from National Route 2. This local route currently finishes on Jara Island (자라도), one of the southernmost parts of the myeon. However, the more touristy smaller islands of the myeon are only connected to Anjwa Island by footbridge.

=== Education ===
Anjwa Island has one middle school, located in Changma-ri. The myeon has several elementary schools.

== Purple Islands ==
Anjwa-myeon also includes Banwol Island (Korean: 반월도, lit. 'half-moon island') and Bakji Island (also known as Parkji Island, Korean: 박지도), which have been given the name the Purple Isles or the Purple Islands. Each of these islands forms a ri in its own right within Anjwa-myeon.

Banwol Island historically depended on fishing and agriculture, with both deep-sea fishing and marsh fishing being practiced. The traditional cultivation of kohlrabi as well as the abundance of native bellflowers inspired a purple-themed rebrand for the region in 2015, with 400 buildings in the region painting their roofs purple, as well as telephone boxes. The planting of 21,500 m^{2} of lavender fields, as well as fields of Aster daisies, lily magnolia, lilac, hollyhock and purpletop vervain have contributed to the aesthetic and environmental appeal of the region throughout the seasons. Since the initial revitalization efforts in 2018, more than 490,000 visitors had come to the island as of 2021. Because of the close association of the color purple with the fandom of South Korean boy band BTS, photo zones dedicated to the group and a sculpture of the catchphrase 'I purple you' are found on the island.

Banwol Island is connected to Bakji Island and thence to Anjwa Island by a large two-section wooden pedestrian bridge called the "Purple Bridge" (Korean: 퍼플교; RR: Peopeul-gyo) due to its color. This has also been referred to as Cheonsa Bridge or Angel Bridge (천사의 다리, Cheonsa-ui Dari, lit. 'Bridge of Angel(s)'), not be confused with a suspension road bridge of much greater dimensions, also located in Shinan County. The bridge was first built to honor the wishes of Kim Mae-geum, a resident of Bakji Island, "to walk on two feet onto the mainland".
