= Inujima =

Japanese island

Coordinates: 34°33′45″N 134°05′59″E

Native name: 犬島
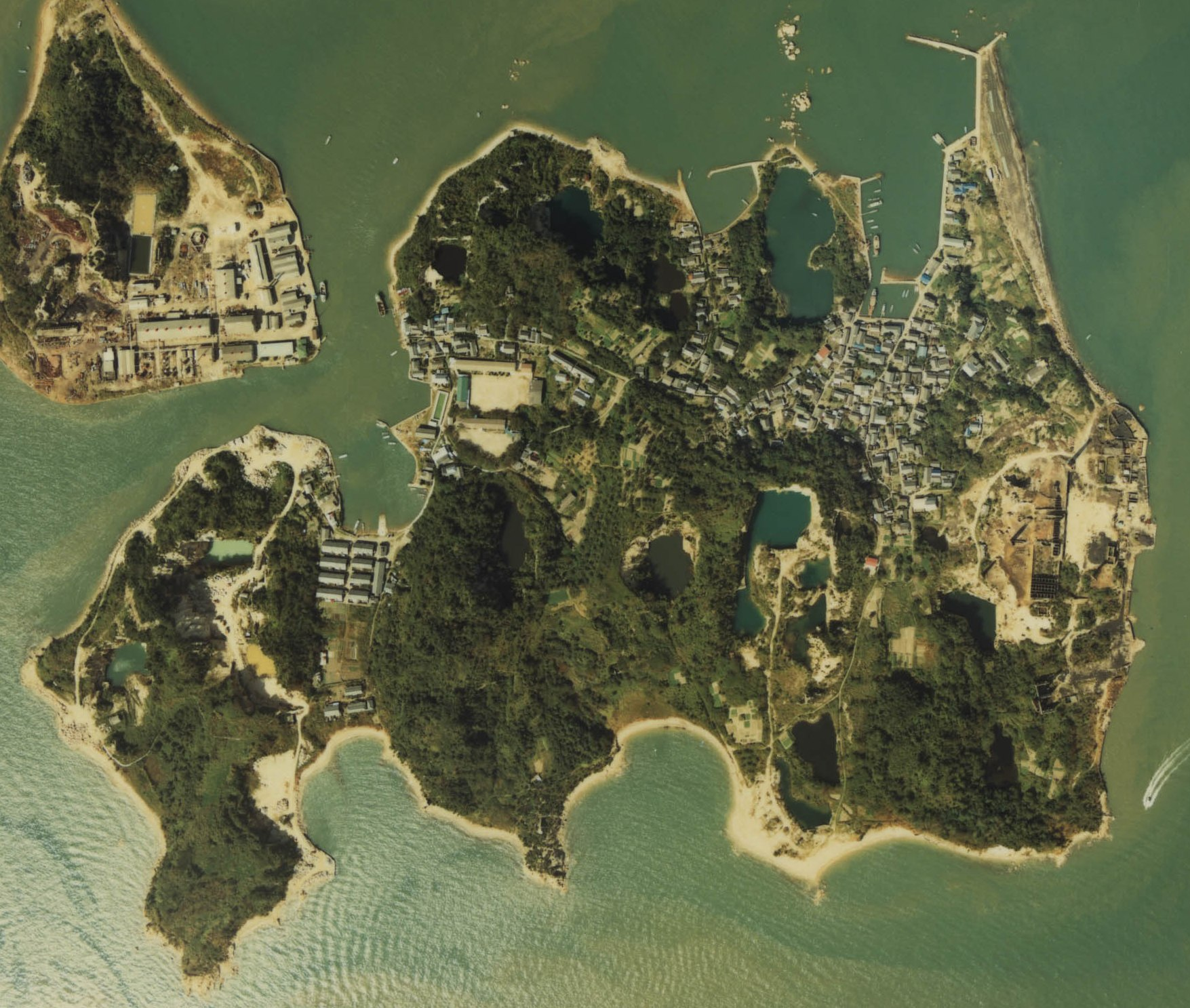
- Aerial photo of Inujima, circa 1980
- Interactive map of Inujima

Administration
- Japan
- Higashi-ku, Okayama, Okayama Prefecture

Demographics
- Population: 47 (2017)

Inujima (犬島; [inɯdʑima], lit. "Dog Island") is a Japanese island in the Seto Inland Sea, located near the coast of Okayama Prefecture. It is part of Higashi-ku, Okayama.

As of the 2020 national census, Inujima has a population of 36.

== Access from mainland ==
A ferry service operates between Hōden and Inujima.Additionally, a high-speed boat connects Inujima to Naoshima via Teshima.

== Industrial heritage ==
A copper refinery was opened on the island in 1909, but this closed in 1919. The remaining brick ruins have been designated as a Heritage of Industrial Modernization by the Ministry of Economy, Trade and Industry, serving as valuable historical evidence of Japan’s modernization. Over the years, the site also served as a filming location for various television dramas and movies.

From 2008, the site formed the centerpiece of "the Inujima Art Project," which aims to preserve the ruins and revitalize the island. Since 2010, when the museum served as a venue for the Setouchi Triennale produced by Fram Kitagawa, Inujima has also gained recognition as an island of contemporary art.

== Inujima Art Project ==
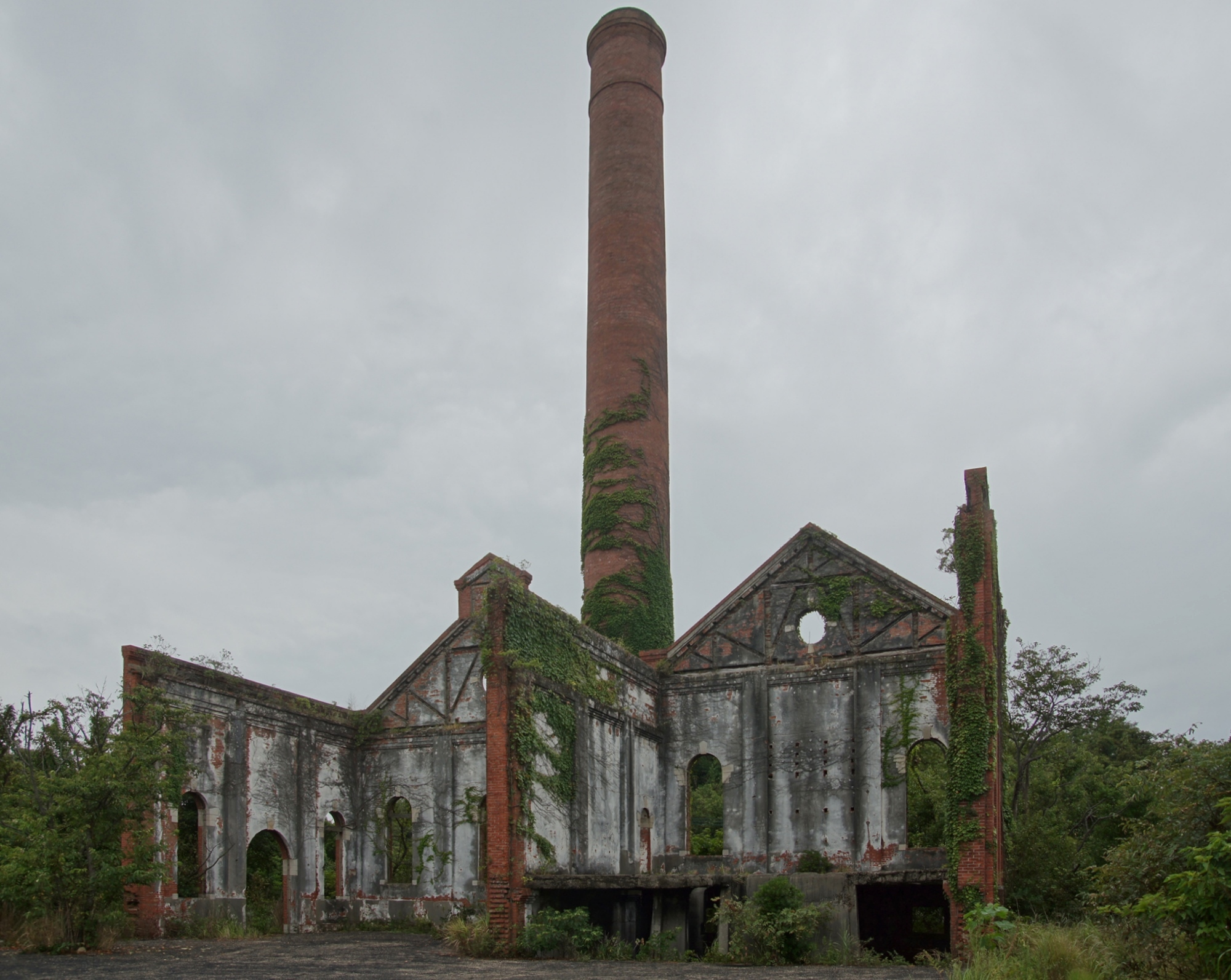
Remains of the refinery in 2011

The Inujima Art Project (犬島アートプロジェクト) refers to an art initiative developed on the island of Inujima in Okayama City, Okayama Prefecture, as a project of Benesse Corporation. The project was realized and promoted through the financial backing of the Fukutake Foundation (formerly the Naoshima Fukutake Art Museum Foundation), after former chairman Soichiro Fukutake endorsed the concept initially proposed by contemporary artist Yukinori Yanagi. The "Inujima Seirensho Art Museum" opened in April 2008 as the first phase of the project, followed by the "Art House Project" and other developments in the second phase.

The first phase of the project, the Inujima Seirensho Art Museum, turned the old seirensho copper refinery into a model of contemporary architecture and art to revitalise Japanese industrial heritage. Originated in 1995 from the vision of contemporary artist Yukinori Yanagi, the project was developed in coordination with architect Hiroshi Sambuichi and local residents from 2006. Centered on the concept of "reclamation," the museum transforms the refinery ruins into a space powered by contemporary art and natural energy, transmitting a message of "reclaim the past and transmigrate it into the future." The museum houses permanent, site-specific installations by Yanagi that are integrated directly into the architectural space. The museum reuses elements of the refinery and the former house of Yukio Mishima, a Nobel-nominated writer known for his vocal dissent of Japan's modernization.

In 2010, as the second phase, the Inujima Art House Project, gallery spaces were opened within the local community of Inujima under the concept of allowing visitors to experience "beautiful landscapes of everyday life and the familiar natural environments that extend beyond the artworks." Curated by artistic director Yuko Hasegawa with architect Kazuyo Sejima, the project features five galleries, started with "F-Art House," "S-Art House," and "I-Art House," followed by the addition of "A-Art House" and "C-Art House" in 2013, along with the "Former site of a stone-cutter's house. While featuring works solely by Yukinori Yanagi, the galleries have also exhibited works by multiple artists, including Kohei Nawa and Haruka Kojin.

== Population data ==
The population of the island has changed over the years as follows.

Year	Population	Number of households
1822	80	18
1862	110	22
1919	1,200	240
1935	1,500	280
1945	982	241
1951	1,350	242
1955	843	220
1960	629	189
1969	750	190
1975	353	133
1984	224	93
1991	130	70
1996	115	59
2001	79	49
2002	70	45
2005	72	44
2017	47	35

== Film locations ==
- Seibu Keisatsu (July 1984)
