= Shikkui =

Plastering material

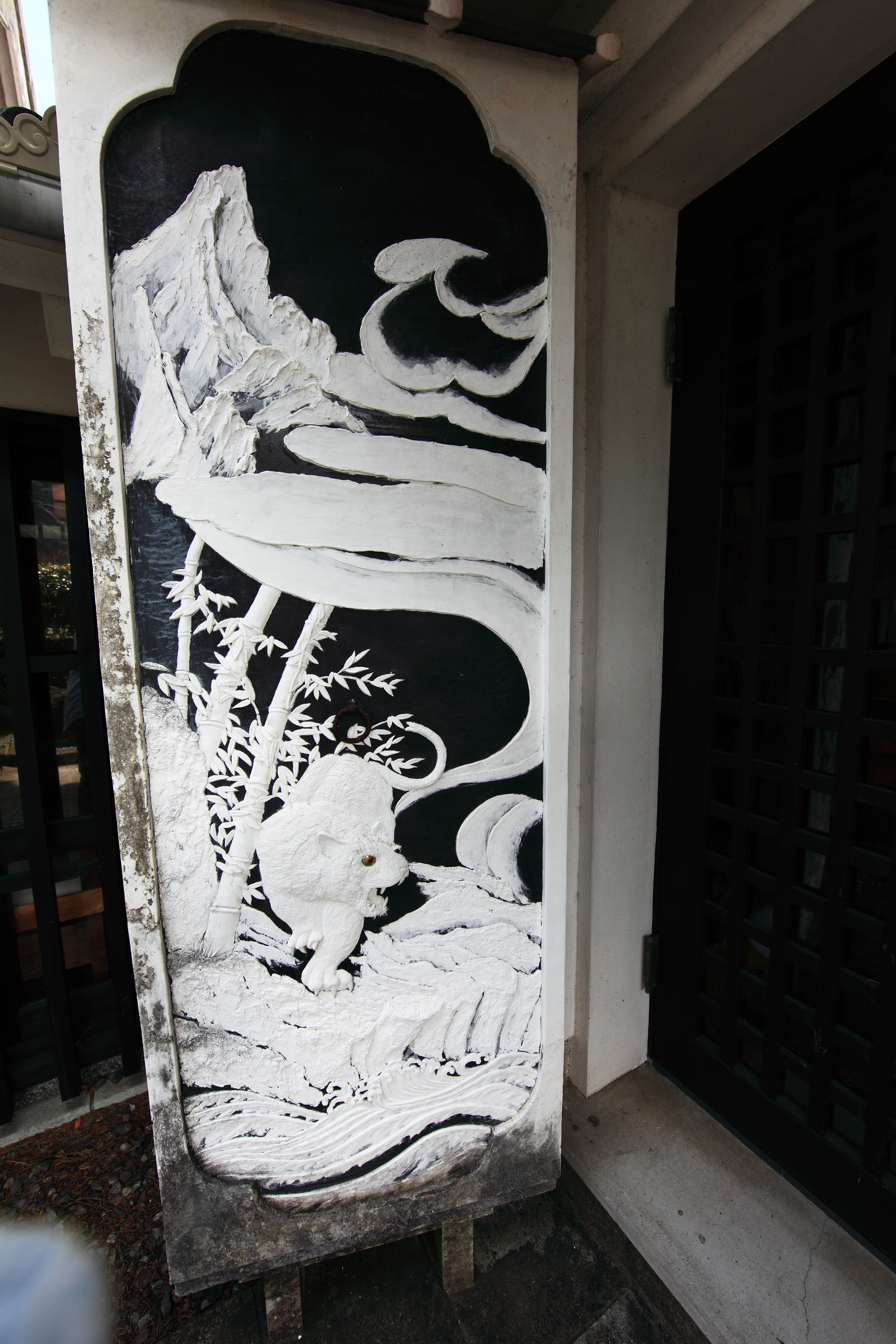
A plaster relief picture made from shikkui.

Shikkui (漆喰) is an ecological nontoxic Japanese lime plaster primarily made out of hydrated lime and calcium carbonate coming from reprocessed eggshells. It is mainly used for surface coatings of walls and ceilings in housing construction.

This material is reputed to achieve a notable range of traditional and modern finishes, including a full range of Venetian stucco and stone effects. Shikkui finishes allow a thin two-coat application, and their elasticity provides good stress-crack resistance. The color and texture of a finishing can be individually customized using a variety of diluted color pigments.

The coatings are highly porous and naturally antiseptic, so indoor air quality is actively improved for healthier spaces. Shikkui coatings are also said to be humidity-regulating, fire-resistant, antistatic (preventing dust accumulation), hypoallergenic, antifungal and mold resistant.

== Ecological characteristics ==
Limix, a Shikkui plaster-based material, has a low carbon footprint in production, and a low energy consumption in production (85% less compared to baked ceramic tiles). It absorbs VOC odors and CO_{2}. It is also fully recyclable or decomposable.

== Technical specifications ==
=== ASTM Test Data ===
The Shikkui Surface Coatings have been tested in accordance with the ASTM International standards by accredited testing laboratories in the United States.

• Fire Resistance (ASTM E84) Class A (Type I in other codes)

• VOC Content (ASTM D3960) Zero-VOC material

• Shore D Hardness (ASTM D2240) 61-85 (depending on product)

• Mold/Fungal Resistance (ASTM D3273/D3274) Rating 10 (no fungal growth)
