= Kohei Nawa =

Japanese sculptor and designer (born 1975)

- Born: 1975 (age 50–51); Osaka, Japan
- Occupations: Sculptor, designer
- Website: kohei-nawa.net

Kohei Nawa (born 1975) is a Japanese sculptor and designer. He holds a bachelor's degree from the Kyoto City University of Arts, and, since 2003, he also holds a Ph.D. in Fine Arts from the Royal College of Art (RCA). Since 1999, Nawa has participated in group exhibitions.
