= Noriyuki Haraguchi =

Japanese artist (1946–2020)

- Born: 1946; Yokosuka, Japan
- Died: 2020 (aged 73–74)
- Education: Nihon University, Tokyo
- Known for: sculpture, installation art
- Notable work: Oil Pool (1971)

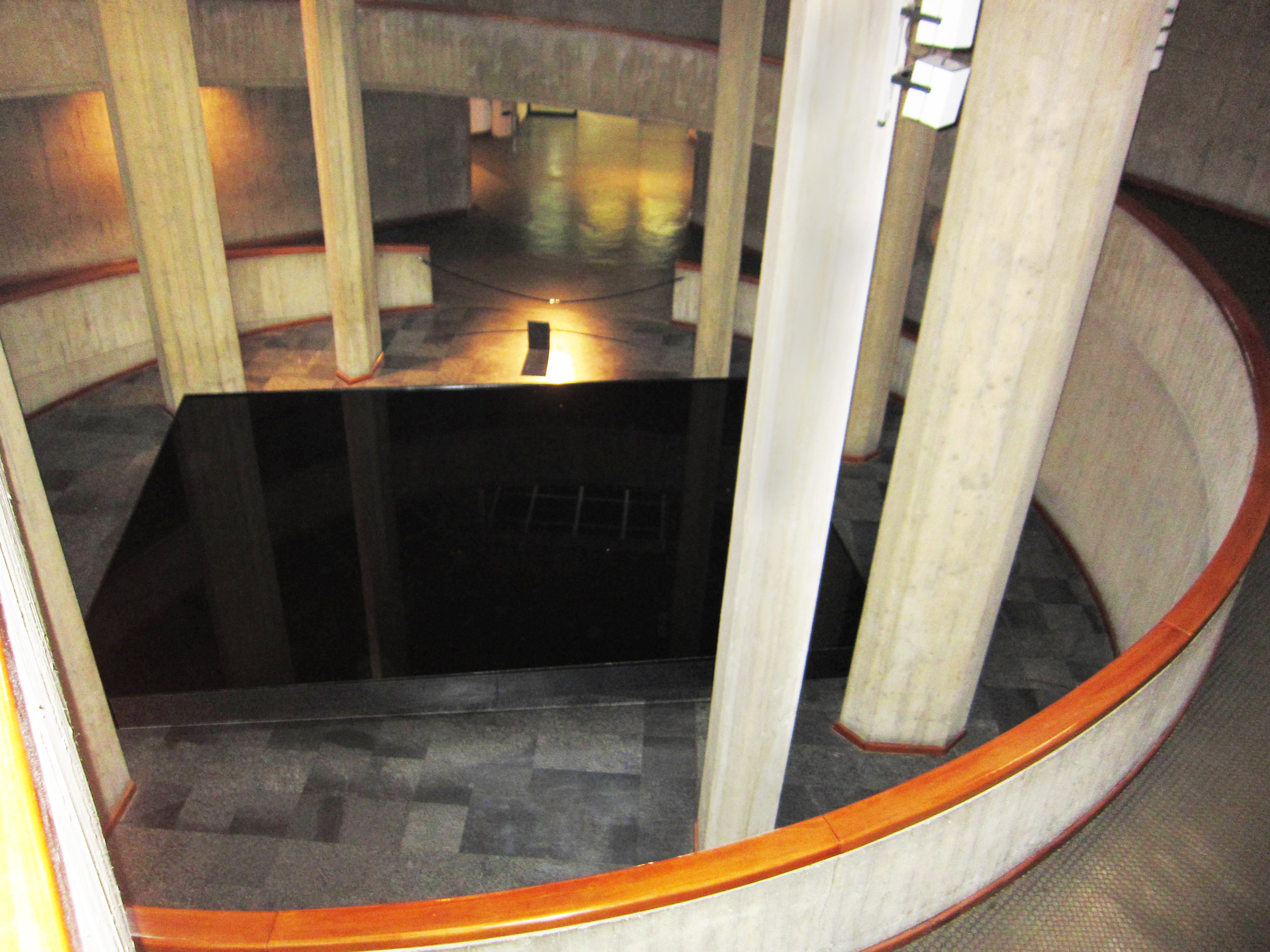
Oil Pool installation at the Tehran Museum of Contemporary Art

Noriyuki Haraguchi (1946-2020) was a Japanese artist who is known as a leading figure of Mono-ha and Post-mono-ha, with a precise attention paid to the materials used (often industrial), their spatial arrangement, the relationship with the exhibition space and the processual reach of the artistic practice. His first works reference the aesthetics and materials of militarism and heavy industry. From the 1970s onwards, his work turned to issues related to perception and representation by creating complex conversation between raw and manufactured materials exploring notions of modernity, industrialization, and nature in works with a beguiling formal beauty.

== Early life ==
Haraguchi was born in Yokosuka, Japan in 1946. The port of Yokosuka had an illustrious history, whether in terms of openness to the world (in the Edo era) or a naval base in times of war (in the Meiji era). When Haraguchi was born, the port was already used by the American army. He spent his childhood in Hokkaido, where his father worked as a radar technician. The extreme landscape had a considerable influence on him.

As a teenager Haraguchi returned to Yokosuka. Impressed by the port and the naval base, he started drawing intensively. At that time, he used a traditional form, namely landscape drawing, to depict the transformations and destructive interventions he saw in his surroundings, as the country entered into a phase of flourishing economic growth.

During the 1960's, he studied at the Nihon University in Tokyo. He participated to anti-Vietnam War protests. He graduated in 1970, his major being oil painting. It was at this time that he developed his first artistic series, that deal outright with conflict.

== Work ==
=== Mono-ha ===
Haraguchi was associated with Mono-ha (School of Things), a 1960s art movement in Japan and Korea that explored the correlations between the natural and industrial worlds. While his contemporaries, Nobuo Sekine, Lee Ufan and Kishio Suga are known for using natural materials, Haraguchi used industrial components such as waste oil, I-beams, automobile parts, miniatures and models, plastics, and rubber.

Right from the outset, Haraguchi's work has operated on very different formal levels : distinctly temporary surface demarcations, bodies (materials) "set" and reflected in defined surroundings (outdoor and inside), and sculptures which not only depict reality but which also imitate it in another material.

Haraguchi was also a central figure of the Nichidai Connection (also known as "Yokosuka Group", due to Haraguchi's early life in Yokosuka), composed of students of the fine arts department at the Nihon University (Tokyo). This group corresponds to one of the three major groups of Mono-ha, in terms of academic training and intellectual exchange. Graduating around the times of the student riots, they belonged to a generation that could fine in them any positive sign for the historical change.

=== Anti-war works ===
Haraguchi often recreated detritus from airplanes, ships and weapons of mass destruction in his sculptures, such as A-7 E Corsair II (2011), Tsumu 147 (1966), and Battleship Ref. A (1966). His first artistic works, at barely eighteen years old, were : Ships (1964) and Submarines (1964). These are scale models of these menacing but fascinating ships and submarines, some of which are partially destroyed, set on a white block and encapsulated in a transparent hood. His iconic sculpture A-4E Skyhawk (1968–69) was a reproduction at full-scale of the U.S. Navy fighter jet of the same name. The sculpture was created behind barricades at Nihon University during a student demonstration when riot police took over the campus during the protests against the Vietnam War. The sculpture makes an immediate impact for its size alone, the reproduction confronting the viewer with the immediate presence of airborne weaponry. On the other hand, its scrappy construction and obviously not-smooth landing on the floor of the gallery make an ironic comment on power and military might. An ineffectual piece of military equipment, doomed to failure, lies on the ground, "only" of any use as a sculpture. The artist's understanding of the model-like quality of his own work is as follow : art creates conceptual yet tangible models of reality.

=== Matter and Mind (Oil Pool) ===
His best known work is Oil Pool (1971), that was first shown in Kassel, Germany at Documenta 6. These sculptures consist of a low-slung rectangular containment structure constructed of steel and filled with thick, opaque waste oil with a glossy surface that appears to be polished black stone. During his lifetime, he created about 20 of these sculptures throughout the world. The sculpture, in its manifestation in Tehran, measures 14 by 21 feet, and 7 inches deep. It contains approximately 1,190 gallons of oil. The official title of the sculpture is Matter and Mind.

Haraguchi said in a short statement for documenta 6 : "We recognize the conditions in our surroundings - the situation, you might say - by relating them to universal concepts, be these the cosmos, nature, the laws of physics, or simply the space in which we find ourselves.... An exhibition space creates a particular kind of self-contained, closed-off situation which can be understood conceptually. Since the point is to express the totality of all our perceptions in this situation, I convey my concepts in an extremely simplified form. In my work I want to present all the elements involved in the process of perception, including myself, in a fixed, balanced relationship. My aim is to objectify horizontality, verticality, materiality, reflections, fluids, containers, physical phenomena of all kinds including myself (body, feelings and thoughts."

=== Event of The transfer of Steel and Untitled (1982) ===
Haraguchi performed this piece in 1975 and 1976 in the Nirenoko Gallery and in the Maki Gallery in Tokyo, moving twenty-seven steel plates (each 180x22.5 cm) around in the space, thereby "occupying" the floor and the walls in a variety of configurations.

Untitled (1982), was made from layered steel plates. Twenty-five layers of steel are used to make a cut-off pyramid, as a stack of numerous surfaces, with each of there being the topmost surface for a moment. Thus the processual quality of the work, its construction over a period of time, becomes an important criterion of the work; at the same time one can equally well imagine the work being dismantled, taken apart piece by piece. A similar effect is also created in 100, Revised of 1985-6 which consists of a pyramid of wooden beams and angled sheet copper.

=== 1990's works ===
In the 1990s, Haraguchi revisited past works, notably his 1975-76 actions, whether through the figure of the upright rectangle or various modalities of spatial demarcation. In addition, the artist returns again and again to his work with gleaming black oil. He changes the position from the centre to the edge of the room, the form mutates from rectangle to circle to square, combinations with wall pictures or partition-like steel plates are explored - but in al of these the notion of space as such determines the form the work takes, as was already the case in his first installation in the mid-1970's. His work seems to progress in cycles, as a performance of devotional repetition, always seeking to produce something new in the process.

The material factors of a work, the act of creating it, and the time and place of its creation are unique and transitory. There is only one life, and likewise there is only one art. Only the continuing process counts, not the results. That is why I constantly move to another place and repeat an action on many occasions. A series of improvisations without beginning or end.

— Noriyuki Haraguchi

== Critical reception ==
Haraguchi's work has been described as simultaneously personal and political; as his birthplace, Yokosuka, is a port city where the United States deployed its forces during the Vietnam war era. His work references the military-industrial complex and the correlation between Japanese modernity and the United States military relationship to it.

== Exhibitions ==
Haraguchi's work has been exhibited in the Museum of Modern Art (1988, 2012-2013), New York, the Tate Museum (2016), the Hamburger Kunsthalle (1974), the Städtische Galerie, Munich (2001), Documenta 6 (1977), Kassel, Biennale de Paris (1977), and other venues.

== Collections ==
Oil Pool was acquired by the Tehran Museum of Contemporary Art for their permanent collection. Haraguchi's work is also in the collection of the Tate Modern Museum, London and the Kröller-Müller Museum in the Netherlands.

== Catalogue raisonné ==
A catalogue raisonné was produced on his work: Helmut Friedel, ed., Noriyuki Haraguchi: Catalogue Raisonne 1963-2001, German and English (Hatje Cantz Publishers, 2001).
