= Soichiro Fukutake =

Japanese businessman (born 1945)

- Born: 1945 or 1946 (age 80–81)
- Education: Waseda University
- Occupation: former chairman of Benesse Corporation
- Spouse: Married
- Children: Hideaki Fukutake

Soichiro Fukutake (福武 總一郎, Fukutake Sōichirō; born 1945) is a Japanese billionaire, and the former chairman of the Benesse Corporation, a publishing firm and juku company known for its patronage of the arts.

== Career ==
Fukutake inherited Benesse, which his father founded in 1955 as Fukutake Publishing. After his father's death in 1986, he renamed it Benesse (Latin for well-being), and expanded the company, and his family owns 15% of the company. Benesse owns 275 nursing homes in Japan and the Berlitz language schools.

== Personal life ==
Fukutake is married, with one son Hideake, and lives in Auckland, New Zealand. He owns a house on Waiheke Island, Tangaroa. Fukutake founded Still Limited, the owner of a range of New Zealand companies including Metro magazine, Kings Plant Barn and the World of Wearable Art.

== Art "shrines" ==
Fukutake has created four museums or "art shrines" on the islands of Naoshima, Teshima and Inujima in an archipelago in Japan's southern Seto Inland Sea, including the Chichu Art Museum. They have been built in collaboration with the architect Tadao Ando.
