= Benesse =

Japanese education and publishing corporation

Benesse Holdings, Inc.

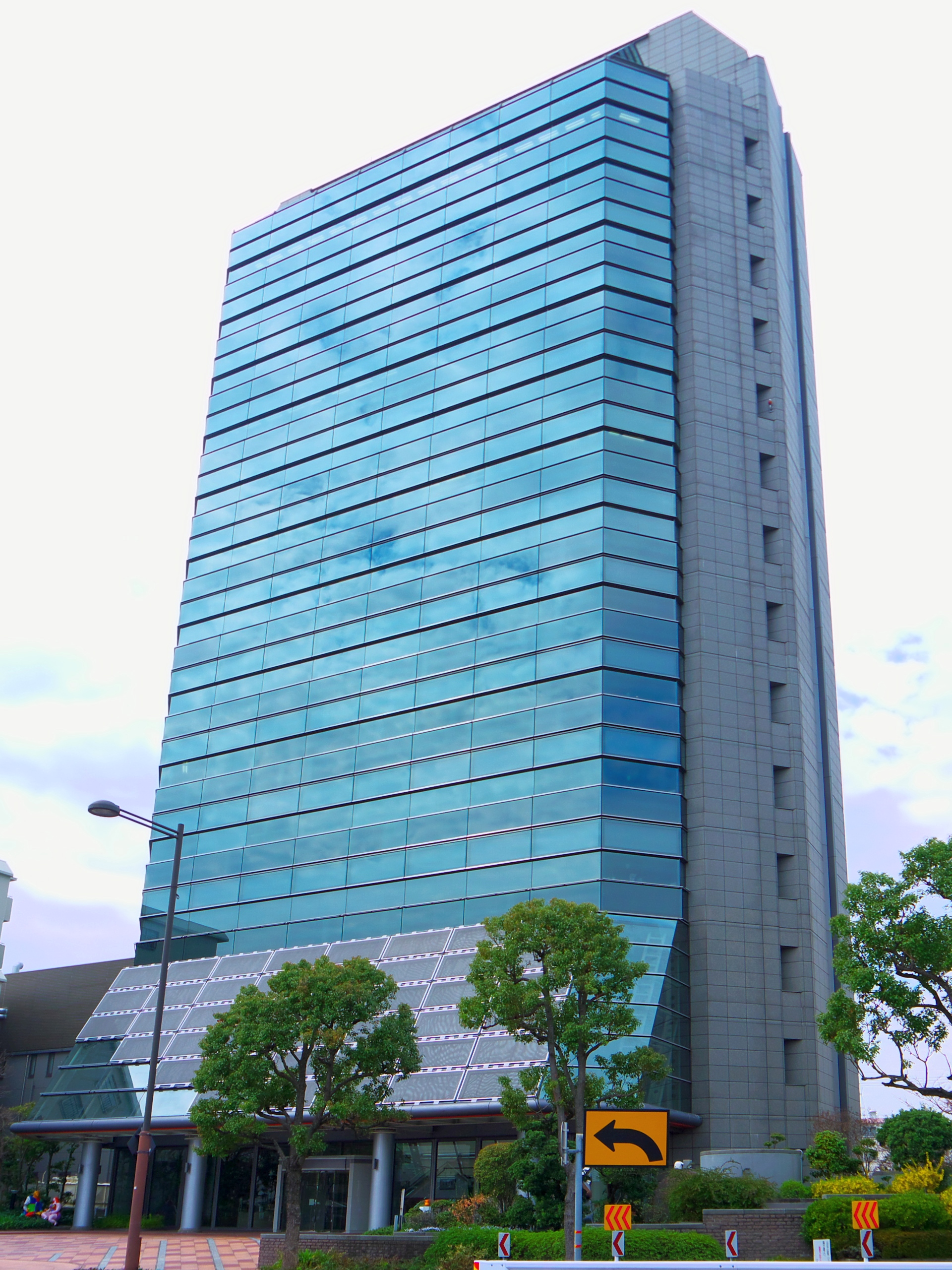
- Headquarters in Okayama
- Native name: 株式会社ベネッセホールディングス
- Formerly: Fukutake Publishing Co., Ltd. (1955–1987); Fukutake Shoten Co., Ltd. (1987–1995); Benesse Corporation (1995–2009)
- Type: Private
- Industry: Educational Services
- Founded: January 28, 1955; 71 years ago
- Headquarters: Kita-ku, Okayama City, Okayama Prefecture, Japan
- Key people: Eikoh Harada (president)
- Revenue: ▼JPY 430.064 billion (2017)
- Operating income: ▼JPY 7.685 billion (2017)
- Net income: ▲JPY 3.557 billion (2017)
- Owner: EFU Investments Ltd.; (2024–present); BPEA EQT; (2024–present)
- Number of employees: 21,022 (consolidated) (2017)
- Subsidiaries: Berlitz Language Schools
- Website: benesse.co.jp

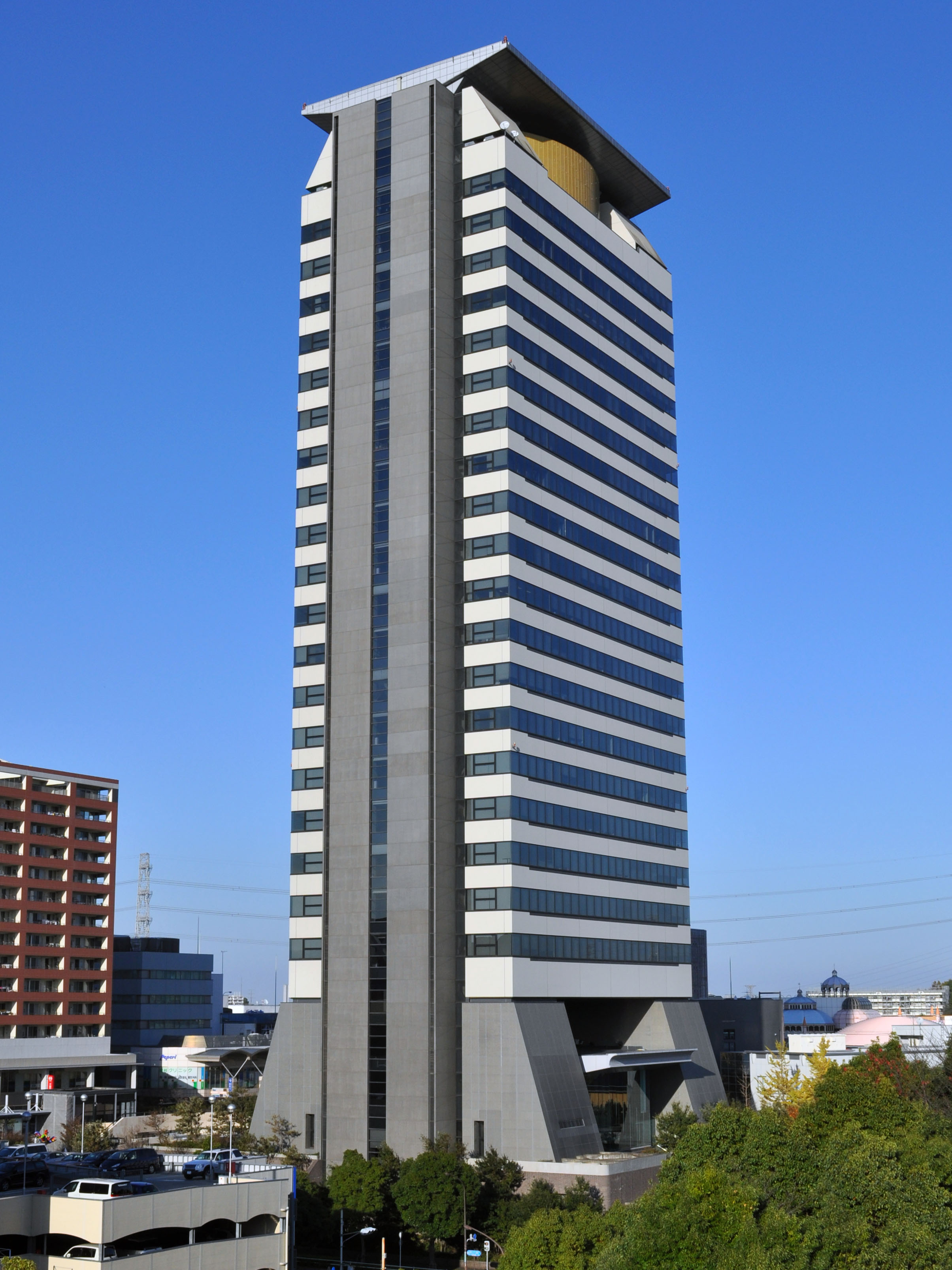
Benesse Corporation Building in Tokyo, Japan.

Benesse Corporation (ベネッセコーポレーション, Benesse Kōporēshon) is a Japanese company which focuses on correspondence education and publishing. Based in Okayama, it is the parent company of Berlitz Language Schools, which in turn is the parent company of ELS Language Centers. Benesse is listed on the Tokyo Stock Exchange (listing code 9783).

The company name is derived from the Latin words "bene" (well) and "esse" (being).

== History ==
The company was founded in 1955 as Fukutake Publishing Co., Ltd. (株式会社福武書店, Kabushiki-gaisha Fukutake Shoten) by Tetsuhiko Fukutake, a publisher of educational materials. In 1986, Soichiro Fukutake succeeded his father as president on the latter's death. His son Hideaki Fukutake is a company director.

In 1994, the company completed the construction of the Fukutake Shoten Tokyo Building (now Benesse Corporation Tokyo Building) in Tama, Tokyo. In April 1995, the company was renamed Benesse Corporation.

A major breakthrough in the company's history was the acquisition of a majority stake in Berlitz Language Schools, which had gone public in 1989. In 2001, Benesse completed the take-over by acquiring 100% ownership of Berlitz and making it a private company once again.

In 2023, Swedish private equity firm EQT AB together with Benesse's founding family announced their intention to buy the company and take it private in a deal valued at US$1.78 billion (¥270 billion). On March 3, 2024, it was announced that EFU Investments Ltd. and a fund managed by BPEA EQT completed the purchase of a 70.1% stake in Benesse.

== Benesse Foundation ==
The Benesse House is a 10-room hotel located inside a contemporary art museum, the Benesse Art Site, on the island of Naoshima in the Seto Inland Sea. Built in 1992, it was designed in partnership with architect Tadao Ando. It was built by the Benesse Foundation which is funded by the Benesse Corporation.

== Franchises ==
Benesse is the originator of the Kodomo Challenge educational program, which debuted in April 1988 and introduced three young-animal mascot characters: Shimajiro the tiger, Torippi the parrot, (Note: Names to the left of the slashes are the original Japanese; those to the right, the English ones used in WildBrain Spark's dub.) and Ramurin the sheep. These characters, along with later 1991 addition Mimirin the rabbit, would appear in a long-running series of Shimajiro anime starting in 1993.
