= Valley Gallery =

Art museum in Naoshima, Japan

- ヴァレーギャラリー
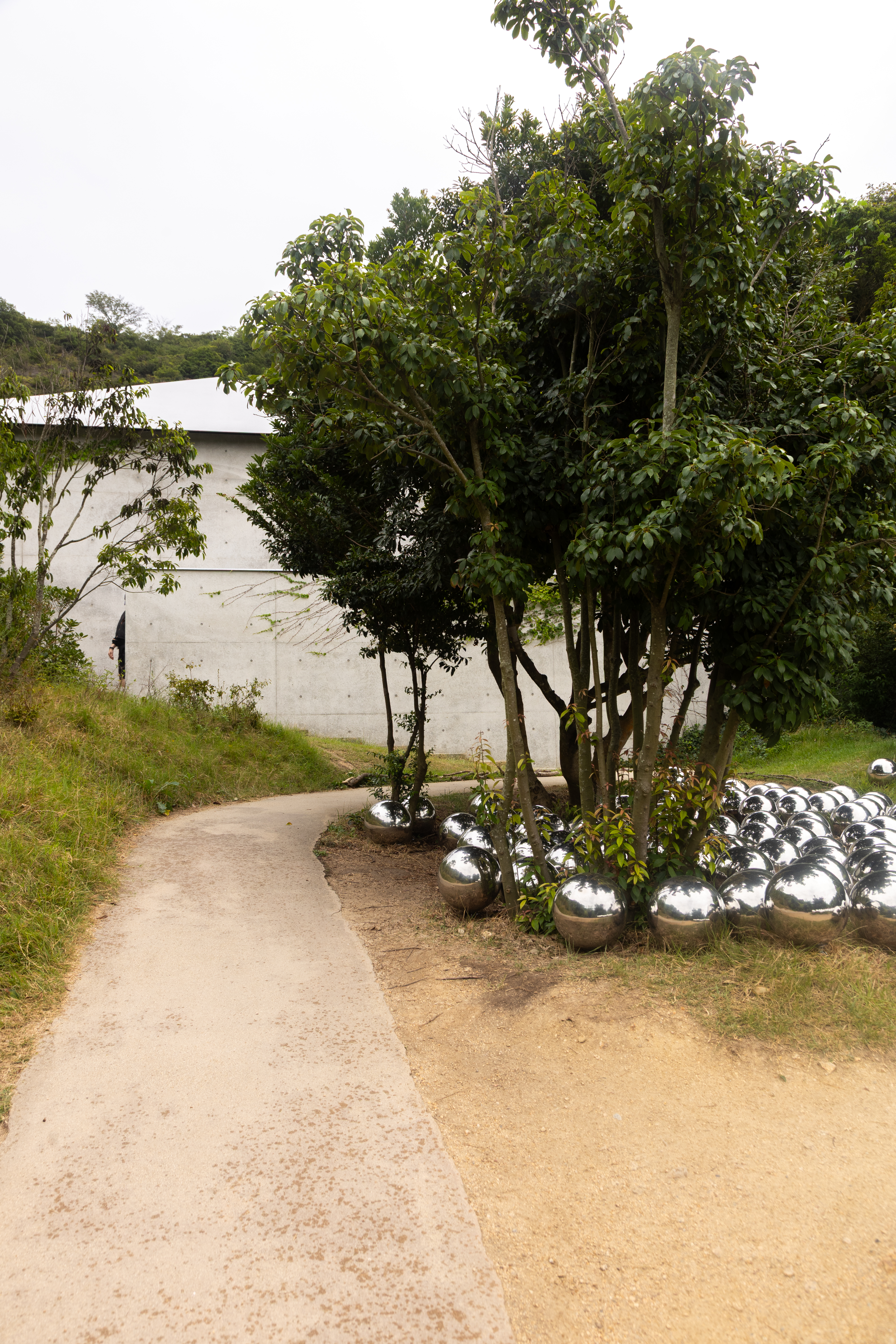
- Entrance to the gallery

General information
- Location: Naoshima, Kagawa, Japan
- Coordinates: 34.44793370633129°N 133.99027781392695°E
- Opened: March 12, 2022

Design and construction
- Architect: Tadao Ando

The Valley Gallery (ヴァレーギャラリー) is an art museum located in the mountains of Naoshima, an island of Japan. Designed by Japanese architect Tadao Ando, marking his ninth building on Naoshima, it opened to the public in 2022 ahead of that year's Setouchi Triennale.

== Design ==
The Valley Gallery, designed by Ando in his characteristic style, is a semi-open, trapezoidal, shrine-like building made of concrete, with a steel roof. Ando specifically designed it with exposure to light in mind vis-à-vis slits and other openings. The Spaces wrote that it "looks like a crashed spaceship" due to its "Sharp angles and apertures," its steel roof "resembling a pair of folded wings."

Both indoors and outdoors, the Valley Gallery has showcased works like Yayoi Kusama's Narcissus Garden and Tsuyoshi Ozawa's 88 Slag Buddhas. It also connects several parts of the Benesse House, allowing its visitors to navigate many of its facilities altogether. Its name refers to its placement in a valley formed by three mountains and covered in azaleas during spring.

== History ==
On October 9, 2021, a press conference was held by Akiko Miki, the International Artistic Director of the Benesse Art Site, as well as Ando and Hiroshi Sugimoto. There, plans were announced for two new facilities on Naoshima. As for the construction itself, Ando and several others, including Soichiro Fukutake, selected a site in a valley near the Lee Ufan Museum, after which he began work on a building "that is as strong as a crystal, even if it is small."

By the following year, on March 12, 2022, the Valley Gallery, as well as the Hiroshi Sugimoto Gallery, opened on Naoshima, coinciding with the thirtieth anniversary of the Benesse Art Site's activities on the island, as well as the Setouchi Triennale.
