= Benesse House =

Art museum and hotel in Naoshima, Japan

Benesse House Museum
- ベネッセハウス ミュージアム
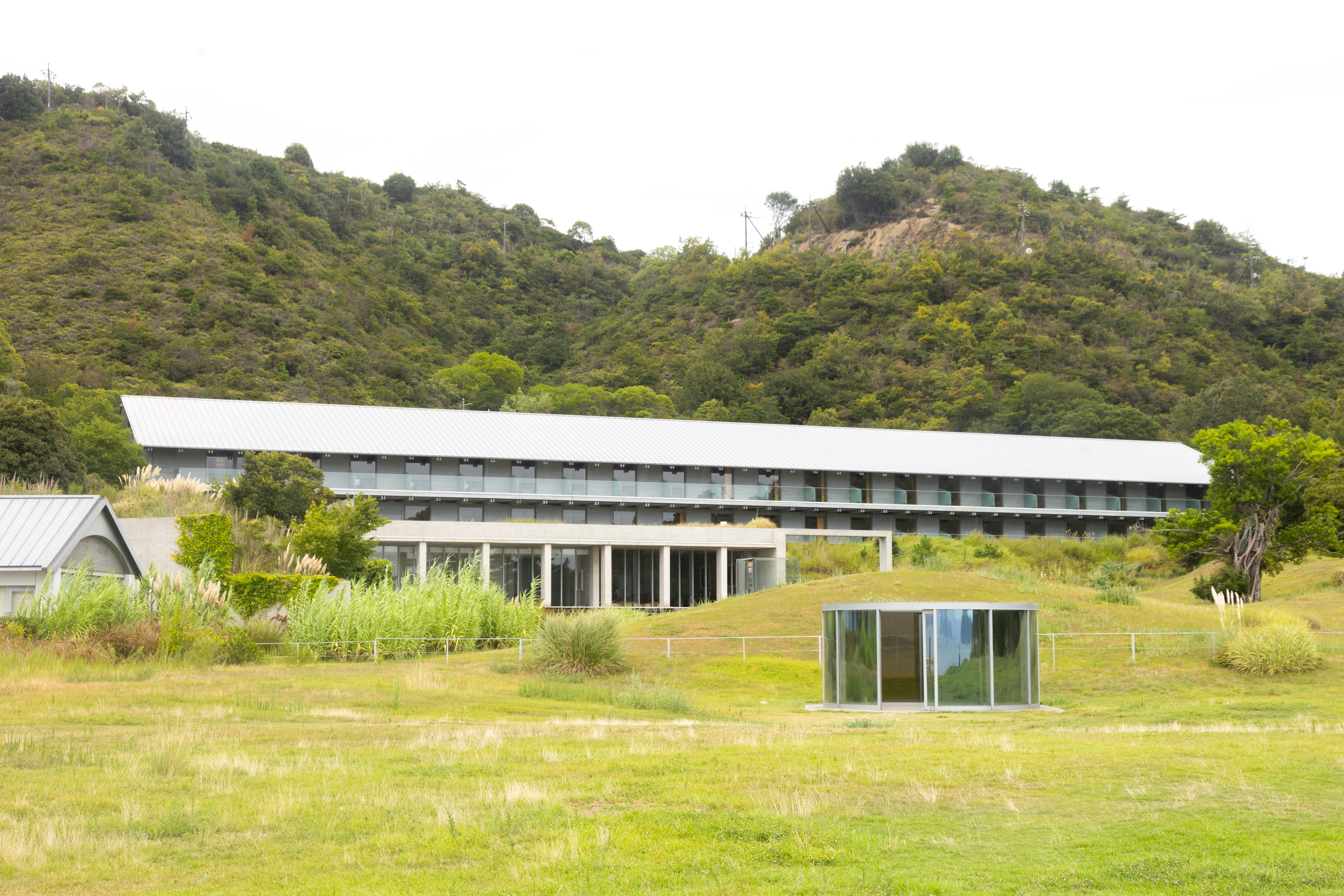
- Outside of the Benesse House Park
- Interactive map of the Benesse House Museum area

General information
- Location: Naoshima, Kagawa, Japan
- Coordinates: 34.44538721943812°N 133.99073929481585°E
- Opened: 1992

Design and construction
- Architect: Tadao Ando

The Benesse House (ベネッセハウス) is an art museum and hotel on Naoshima, an island of Japan, designed by Japanese architect Tadao Ando. It opened in 1992 and was an early effort of the Benesse Art Site's activities to revitalize Naoshima into an art haven. Since then, Ando has expanded it and combined it with other parts of the Benesse Art Site, such as the Valley Gallery and the Hiroshi Sugimoto Gallery, both of which were opened in 2022.

== History ==
The Benesse House was designed by Ando and opened for public use in 1992. In 1985, it had been envisioned between Fukutake Publishing founding president Tetsuhiko Fukutake and Naoshima mayor Chikatsugu Miyake. Afterward, Ando was tapped to help design and build several museums across the island of Naoshima, newly marked for development as a whole in the eighties. Over the years, Ando continued to design and expand the Benesse House while establishing other buildings nearby as well.

Facing the mountains of Shikoku, the Benesse House has four hotel areas: the Museum, the Park, the Beach, and the Oval, while housing several Japanese and French restaurants. Many works of art are exhibited within, including selections by Shinro Ohtake, Jean-Michel Basquiat, and David Hockney, among others. Outside, a pumpkin by Yayoi Kusama sits by the ocean.

In 2022, two new galleries were opened as expansions of Benesse House. The Valley Gallery sits between Benesse House and the Chichu Art Museum, while the Hiroshi Sugimoto Gallery serves as an expansion of the Benesse House's Park where his photographs were previously exhibited. Both were designed by Ando as well.

In 2024, the Benesse House updated its exhibition for the first time in thirty years to celebrate Benesse Prize–winning artists from the Singapore Biennale. Later, in 2025, the Benesse House updated its exhibition again with works from Cy Twombly, Basquiat, Yves Klein, Frank Stella, Hockney, Jennifer Bartlett, and others.

== Critical reception ==
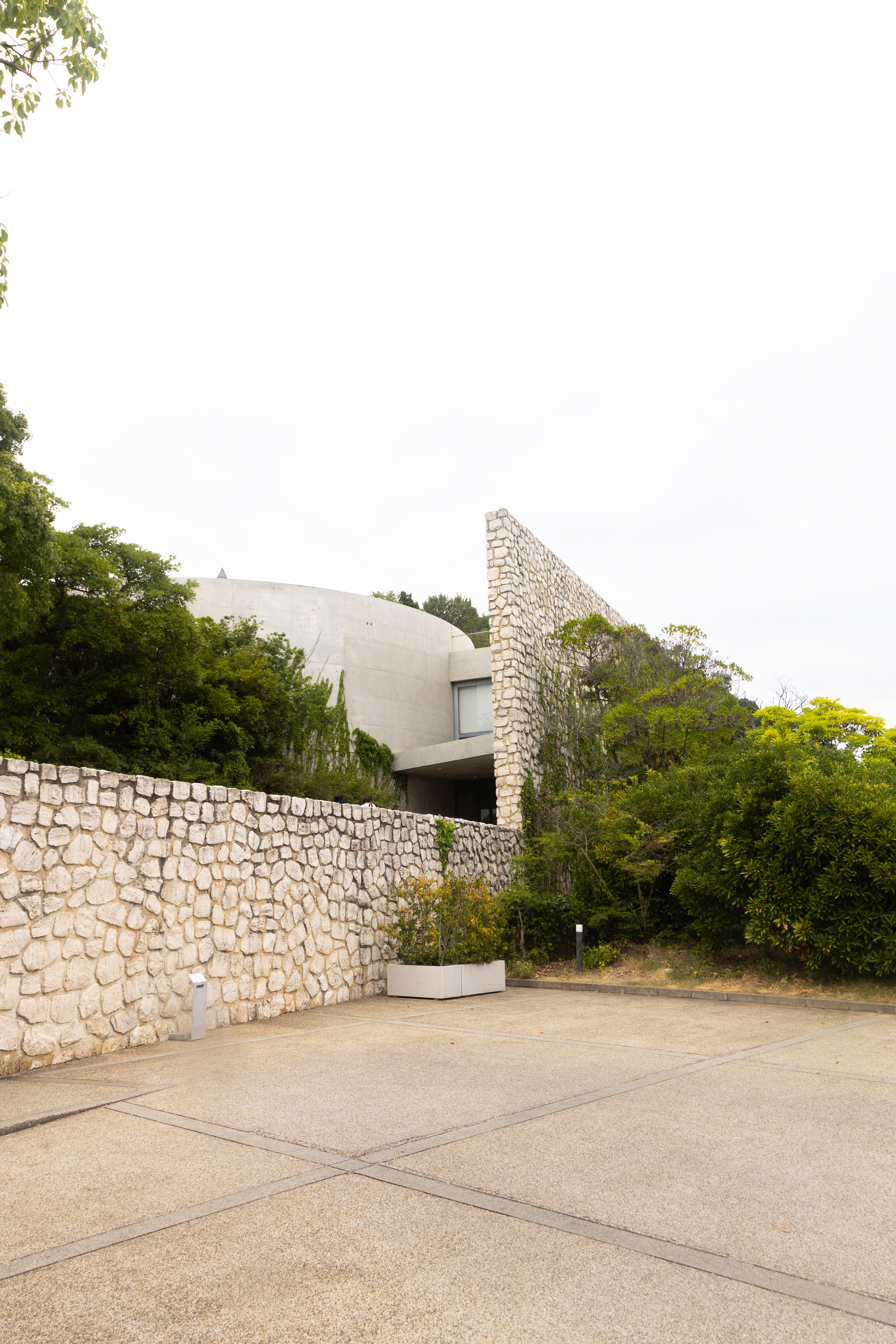
Entrance to the museum

The Daily Telegraph, in a review of the Benesse House, rated its location a 9/10, its style and character a 9/10, its service and facilities an 8/10, its rooms a 9/10, its food and drink an 8/10, and its value for money an 8/10. In 2025, Travel + Leisure called it, as well as other Naoshima and Teshima hotels, one of the first examples of the "art hotel" in the world. Casa Brutus named it among the best museums in Japan.

Meer Travel stated that "Staying at Benesse House is as little like a night at a museum as one could ever hope for. The hotel stands out as a deliciously eccentric and decadent beacon of hospitality among the region's more conventional local inns." Tokyo Weekender called the Benesse House a "crown jewel" of Naoshima as "a facility that integrates hospitality and high art." In 2025, English writer Pico Iyer called the Benesse House "the most stylish (and unforgettable) hotel I’ve encountered in Japan or almost anywhere else I’ve been over 51 years of constant travel," having visited it six times.
