= Hiroshi Sugimoto =

Japanese artist and photographer

- 杉本博司
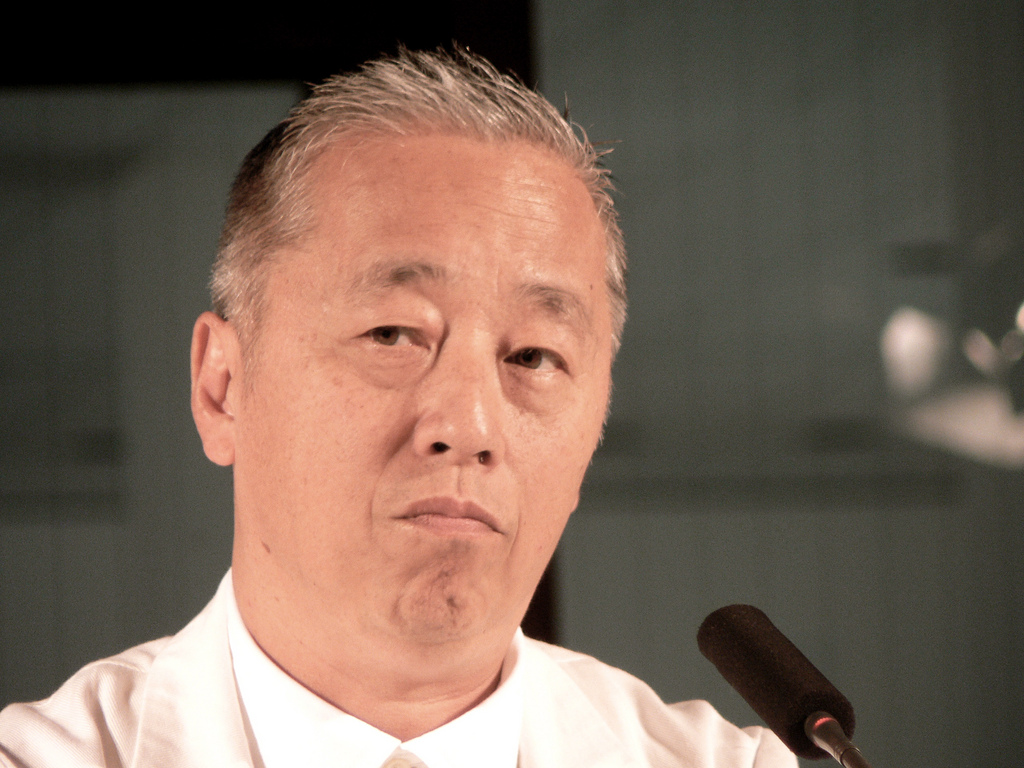
- Sugimoto in 2008
- Born: 23 February 1948 (age 78); Tokyo, Japan
- Known for: Photography, architecture, film industry
- Website: sugimotohiroshi.com

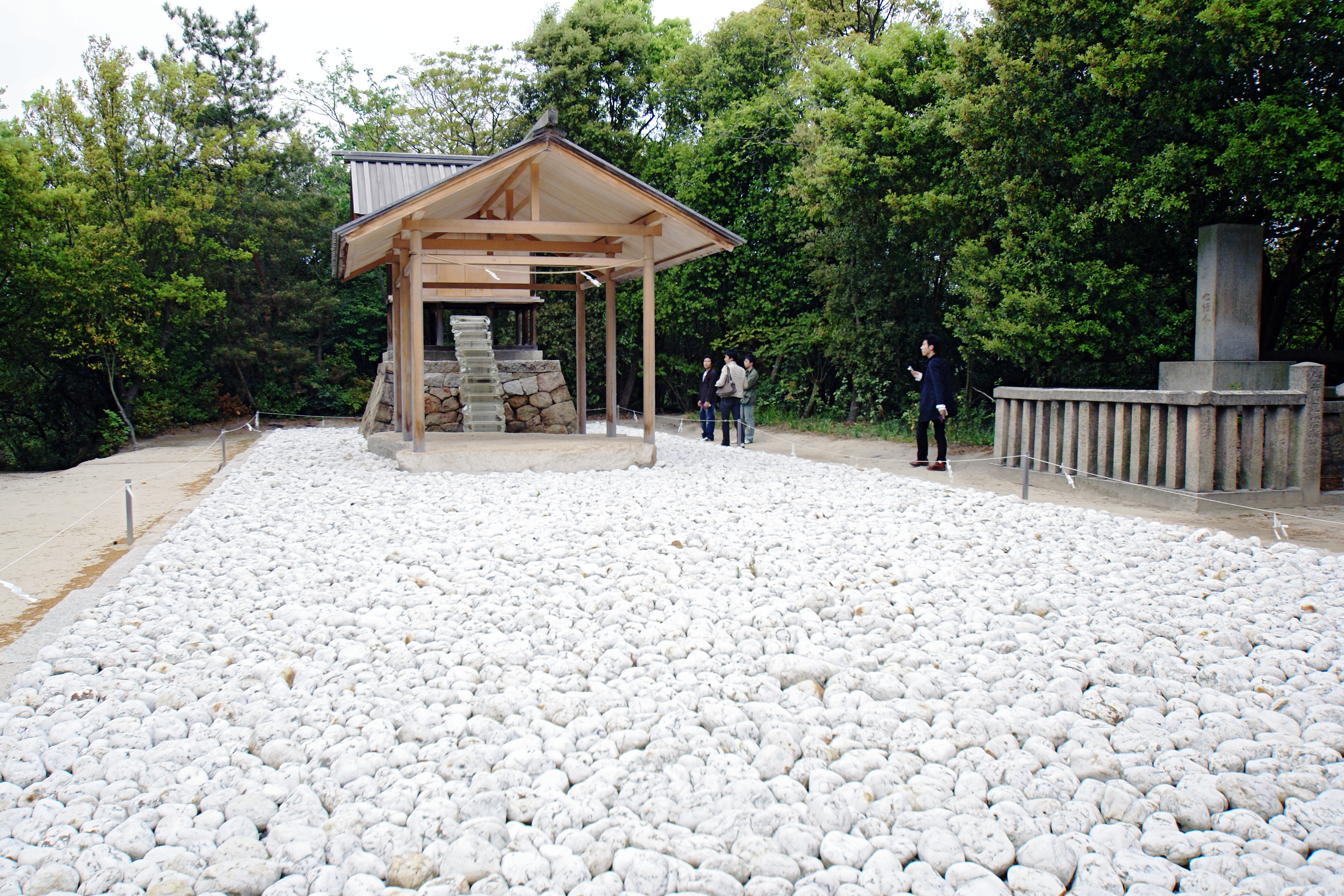
"Appropriate Proportion", one of his architectural projects. Renovation of Gooh shrine, Naoshima, Kagawa prefecture, Japan

Hiroshi Sugimoto (杉本博司, Sugimoto Hiroshi; born 23 February 1948) is a Japanese photographer and architect. He leads the Tokyo-based architectural firm New Material Research Laboratory.

== Early life and education ==
Hiroshi Sugimoto was born and raised in Tokyo, Japan. He reportedly took his earliest photographs in high school, photographing film footage of Audrey Hepburn as it played in a movie theater. In 1970, Sugimoto studied politics and sociology at Rikkyō University in Tokyo. In 1974, he retrained as an artist and received his BFA at the Art Center College of Design, Pasadena, California. Afterwards, Sugimoto settled in New York City. He soon started working as a dealer of Japanese antiquities in Soho.

== Photography ==
Sugimoto has spoken of his work as an expression of 'time exposed', or photographs serving as a time capsule for a series of events in time. His work also focuses on transience of life, and the conflict between life and death.

The conceptual and philosophical aspects of Sugimoto's work are deeply influenced by the writings and works of Marcel Duchamp, as well as the Dadaist and Surrealist movements as a whole. He has also expressed a great deal of interest in late 20th century modern architecture.

His use of an 8×10 large-format camera and extremely long exposures has garnered Sugimoto a reputation as a photographer of highly skilled technical ability.

=== Dioramas, In Praise of Shadows and Portraits ===
Sugimoto began his work with Dioramas in 1976, a series in which he photographed displays in natural history museums. (A polar bear on a fake ice floe contemplates his fresh-killed seal; vultures fight over carrion in front of painted skies; exotic monkeys hoot in a plastic jungle.) Initially the pictures were shot at the American Museum of Natural History, a place he returned to later for dioramas in 1982, 1994, and 2012. Many of the earlier silver gelatin prints – including Polar Bear (1976), his first photograph from the Diorama series – present animals. The assumption that cameras show reality tricks many viewers into assuming the animals in the photos are real until they examine the pictures carefully. His later work in 2012 – including Mixed Deciduous Forest and Olympic Rain Forest – focus on natural landscapes rather than diorammas.

In Praise of Shadows (1998) is a series of photographs based on Gerhard Richter's paintings of burning candles.

His series Portraits, begun as a commission by the Deutsche Guggenheim in 1999, returns to the idea of reality in photography. In that series, Sugimoto photographed wax figures of Henry VIII and his wives based on portraits from the 16th century. When taking the picture, Sugimoto attempted to recreate the lighting that would have been used by the painter. Using Madame Tussaud's in London and Amsterdam, as well as a wax museum in Ito, Japan, Sugimoto used 8-by-10-inch negatives to take three-quarter view photos of the wax figures. They were typically shot against a black background.

=== Theatres ===
In 1978, Sugimoto created the Theatres series by photographing old American movie palaces and drive-ins with a folding 4x5 camera and tripod. His approach was to open the camera shutter and expose the film for the duration of the entire feature-length movie, the film projector providing the sole lighting. The luminescent screen in the centre of the composition, the architectural details, and the seats of the theatre are the only subjects that register owing to the long exposure of each photograph. The lighting gives the works a surreal look, and continues Sugimoto's attempt to reveal time in photography. Sugimoto discovered that "Different movies give different brightnesses. If it's an optimistic story, I usually end up with a bright screen; if it's a sad story, it's a dark screen. Occult movie? Very dark."

=== Seascapes ===
In 1980 he began working on an ongoing series of photographs of the sea and its horizon, Seascapes, in locations all over the world. He used an old-fashioned large-format camera to make exposures of varying duration (up to three hours). The locations varied widely and included the English Channel, Cliffs of Moher, the Arctic Ocean, Positano, the Tasman Sea, the Norwegian Sea at Vesterålen, and the Black Sea at Ozuluce in Turkey. The black-and-white pictures are all exactly the same size, bifurcated exactly in half by the horizon line. The systematic nature of Sugimoto's project recalls the work Sunrise and Sunset at Praiano by Sol LeWitt, in which he photographed sunrises and sunsets over the Tyrrhenian Sea off Praiano on the Amalfi Coast.

=== Architecture works ===
In 1995, Sugimoto photographed the Sanjūsangen-dō ("Hall of Thirty-Three Bays") in Kyoto. In special preparation for the shoot, he had all late-medieval and early-modern embellishments removed, and the contemporary fluorescent lighting turned off. Shot from a high vantage point and editing out all architectural features, the resulting 48 photographs concentrate on the bodhisattvas – 1,000 life-size and almost identical gilded figures carved from wood in the 12th and 13th centuries, that are banked up inside the building.

In 1997, on a commission from the Museum of Contemporary Art in Chicago, Sugimoto began producing series of large-format photographs of notable buildings around the world. In 2003, the museum showed the series in a sepulchral installation, with the pictures installed on layered rows of dark-painted partitions. Sugimoto's later Architecture series (2000–03) consists of blurred images of well-known examples of Modernist architecture.

In 2001, Sugimoto traveled the length of Japan, visiting the so-called meisho "famous sites" for pines: Miho no Matsubara, Matsushima, and Amanohashidate. On the royal palace grounds in Tokyo, Sugimoto photographed a pine landscape, copying a traditional 16th-century Japanese ink-painting style. Specifically, the Shōrin-zu byōbu (Pine Forest Screens) (ca. 1590) by Momoyama period painter, Hasegawa Tōhaku (1539–1610), represent a coming of age in Japanese imaging.

=== Joe ===
In July 2003 Sugimoto travelled to St. Louis to photograph the Pulitzer Arts Foundation, designed by Tadao Ando whose work he had portrayed various times before. Instead, he photographed Richard Serra's sculpture Joe in an outdoor courtyard at dawn and at dusk for five days. The resulting Joe series was made using short exposure, producing a blurring effect from Sugimoto's unconventional use of the flexibility of the large format camera. He set the distance between the lens and the film to half the focal length, in his words "twice-infinity". Sugimoto gave the photographs serial numbers from his Architecture series. The hand-developed gelatin silver photographs are mounted on aluminum panels but are otherwise unframed, unglazed, and unlaminated to draw attention to what Sugimoto describes as the "transformation from the three-dimensional steel source sculpture to the thin layers of what I would call my 'silver sculpture'." When the Pulitzer Arts Foundation decided to publish a book about the series, Sugimoto asked Jonathan Safran Foer to write a text to accompany the nineteen selected photographs.

=== Other notable series and collaborations ===
A 2004 series consisted of large photographs depicting antique mathematical and mechanical models, which Sugimoto came across in Tokyo and shot from slightly below. The mathematical forms – stereometric models in plaster – were created in the 19th century to provide students with a visual understanding of complex trigonometric functions. The mechanical forms – machine models including gears, pumps and regulators – are industrial tools used to demonstrate basic movements of modern machinery. Sugimoto began working on this series as a response to The Bride Stripped Bare By Her Bachelors, Even (The Large Glass) by Marcel Duchamp.

For the series Stylized Sculpture (2007), Sugimoto selected distinctive garments by celebrated couturiers from the collection of the Kyoto Costume Institute. Headless mannequins were shot in chiaroscuro—including Madeleine Vionnet's T-dress, Balenciaga's ensemble, Yves St Laurent's Mondrian shift, and Issey Miyake's slip.

For his 2009 series Lightning Fields, Sugimoto abandoned the use of the camera, producing photographs using a 400,000 volt Van de Graaff generator to apply an electrical charge directly onto the film. Instead of placing an object on photo-sensitive paper, then exposing it to light, he produced the image by causing electrical sparks to erupt over the surface of a 7-by-2.5-foot sheet of film laid on a large metal tabletop. The highly detailed results combine bristling textures and branching sparks to create evocative images.

In 2009 U2 selected Sugimoto's Boden Sea, Uttwil (1993) as the cover for their album No Line on the Horizon to be released in March that year. This image had previously been used by sound artists Richard Chartier and Taylor Deupree for their 2006 CD inspired by Sugimoto's Seascapes series. Sugimoto noted it was merely a "coincidence" that the image appears on both album covers. In addition, he notes that the agreement with U2 was a "stone age deal" or, artist-to-artist. No cash exchanged hands, rather a barter agreement which allows Sugimoto to use the band's song "No Line on the Horizon" (partly inspired by the "Boden Sea" image) in any future project.

In 2009, Sugimoto acquired rare negatives made by Henry Fox Talbot in the 1840s and retrieved, through an intensely fragile process, what "looks remarkably like Plato's shadows in the cave". The works of Sugimoto's All Five Elements series (2011) consist of optical quality glass with black and white film. On the occasion of Art Basel in 2012, Sugimoto presented Couleurs de l'Ombre, 20 different colorful scarf designs in editions of just seven, all created using a new inkjet printing method for French fashion label Hermès.

== Architecture ==
Sugimoto founded his architecture practice in Tokyo after receiving requests to design structures from varied institutions including restaurants and art museums. Because he does not have an architectural license himself—an official permit would require years of training—he hired three qualified architects to help him execute his vision. Architecture is one component that he uses to design the settings for his exhibitions. His recent projects include an architectural commission at Naoshima Contemporary Art Center in Japan, for which Sugimoto designed and built a Shinto shrine. He also gets involved with performance art occurring beside these works.

In 2013, Sugimoto created a sculpture and rock garden for the Sasha Kanetanaka restaurant in Omotesandō, Tokyo. He also designed Stove, a French restaurant housed in a refurbished wooden house in the Kiyoharu Art Village, Yamanashi Prefecture. For the first in a series of temporary artist-designed structures at the Le Stanze del Vetro museum on view during the Venice Architecture Biennale in 2014, Sugimoto designed a glass teahouse which was set over a tiled pool. A traditional tea ceremony was performed for the public inside of it.

In 2011, Sugimoto published an architecture book about the many museums that have shown his work, from the Hirshhorn Museum in Washington, D.C., to the Fondation Cartier in Paris.

In 2018, the Hirshhorn Museum and Sculpture Garden announced that Sugimoto would transform the interior of the Gordon Bunshaft-designed building. The plans included a coffee bar and removal of the tint on the windows.

== Sculpture ==
Sugimoto designed Point of Infinity, a nearly 70 ft-high stainless steel needle that also acts as a sundial, on top of the Yerba Buena Hilltop Park on Yerba Buena Island.

== Exhibitions ==
Sugimoto has exhibited extensively in major museums and galleries throughout the world, including the Museum of Contemporary Art in Los Angeles (1994), the Metropolitan Museum of Art, New York (1995); Deutsche Guggenheim, Berlin (2000); the Kunsthaus Bregenz, Austria (2002); the Serpentine Gallery, London (2003) and the Fondation Cartier pour l'Art Contemporain, Paris (2004). A major 30-year survey of his work opened at the Mori Art Museum, Tokyo in 2005 and travelled to the Hirshhorn Museum and Sculpture Garden, Washington, D.C., and the Modern Art Museum of Fort Worth, Texas (2006). In 2007, a European retrospective began at K20 Kunstsammlung Nordrhein-Westfalen, Düsseldorf (2007) and traveled to the Museum der Moderne, Salzburg, Neue Nationalgalerie, Berlin and Kunstmuseum Luzern, Switzerland. (2008). In 2011, Gagosian Gallery in Paris showed Sugimoto's series Stylized Sculpture alongside Rodin's sculptures The Three Shades (c. 1880), Monument to Victor Hugo (1897), and The Whistler Muse (1908).

In 2005, Japan Society, New York, and Arthur M. Sackler Gallery, Washington, organized a US and Canadian tour of "Hiroshi Sugimoto: History of History", an exhibition of artifacts that Sugimoto has collected over the years, particularly from East Asia and Japan, curated by the artist himself (travelled to the Kanazawa 21st Century Museum of Contemporary Art and the National Museum of Art, Japan). In 2013, Sugimoto exhibited his artwork alongside pieces from his personal collection at the Fondation Pierre Bergé-Yves Saint Laurent in Paris.

From 7 February to 10 May 2015, The Phillips Collection exhibited Hiroshi Sugimoto: Conceptual Forms and Mathematical Models, featuring five photographs and three sculptures. "This is the first exhibition to contrast Sugimoto's mathematical photographs of 19th-century mathematical plaster models inspired by Man Ray with his own aluminum or stainless-steel mathematical models crafted with computer-controlled, precision milling machines." It was shown in conjunction with The Phillips Collection exhibit, Man Ray–Human Equations: A Journey from Mathematics to Shakespeare,

His exhibition, "Lost Human Genetic Archive", at the Tokyo Photographic Art Museum in 2016, incorporated selected images from Dioramas, Seascapes, Theaters and the Sanjūsangen-dō series, among others. His exhibition at the Tel Aviv Museum of Art in 2018 featured 34 large-scale photographs from Sugimoto's central series. A retrospective of his work is currently showing at the Museum of Contemporary Art, Sydney (2024).

In 2022, the Benesse Art Site on Naoshima opened the Hiroshi Sugimoto Gallery, showcasing work from throughout Sugimoto's career and art practice.

== Collections ==
Sugimoto's work is held in numerous public collections including the Metropolitan Museum of Art, New York; Moderna Museet, Stockholm; Centre Georges Pompidou, Paris; Museum of Contemporary Art, Tokyo; Museum of Modern Art, New York; National Gallery, London; National Museum of Modern Art, Tokyo; Smithsonian Institution, Washington, D.C.; MACBA, Barcelona; and Tate Gallery, London.

== Odawara Art Foundation ==
In 2009, Sugimoto established the Odawara Art Foundation to promote Japanese culture. In 2014, the Japan Society awarded a $6 million grant to the foundation. The money went the construction of a multidisciplinary arts complex in Odawara, about 60 miles west of Tokyo. The complex opened to the public on October 9, 2017. The project includes an original 15th-century entrance gate, a minimalist exhibition space, a modern Japanese teahouse, and a contemporary Noh theater with a stage that appears to float above the sea. The foundation will produce joint productions with the Japan Society as well as artist-in-residency programs at the new complex. The two institutions will also collaborate on exhibitions and performances. It is based at Sugimoto's Enoura Observatory in Odawara.

== Awards ==
- 2001 – Hasselblad Foundation International Award (Hasselblad Honour).
- 2009 – Japanese Art Association: Praemium Imperiale prize for the 'Painting' category
- 2010 – Medal with Purple Ribbon
- 2013 – Officier of the Ordre des Arts et des Lettres
- 2014 – Isamu Noguchi Award for Kindred Spirits in Innovation, Global Consciousness and Japanese/American Exchange
- 2017: Centenary Medal, Royal Photographic Society

== Books ==
- Seascapes. Los Angeles: Museum of Contemporary Art, 1994. ISBN 0-914357-32-8.
- Time Exposed. London: Thames & Hudson, 1995. ISBN 0-500-97427-6.
- In Praise of Shadows. Germany: Steidl, 2000. ISBN 4-7713-3414-5.
- Theatres. Koln: Walther Konig, 2006. ISBN 0-615-11596-9.

== Art market ==
Sugimoto has been represented by Lisson Gallery, New York, since 2024. He was formerly represented by Pace Gallery, New York, since 2010, while also regularly showing with Gagosian Gallery. Before, he showed with Sonnabend Gallery.
