= Pae White =

American artist

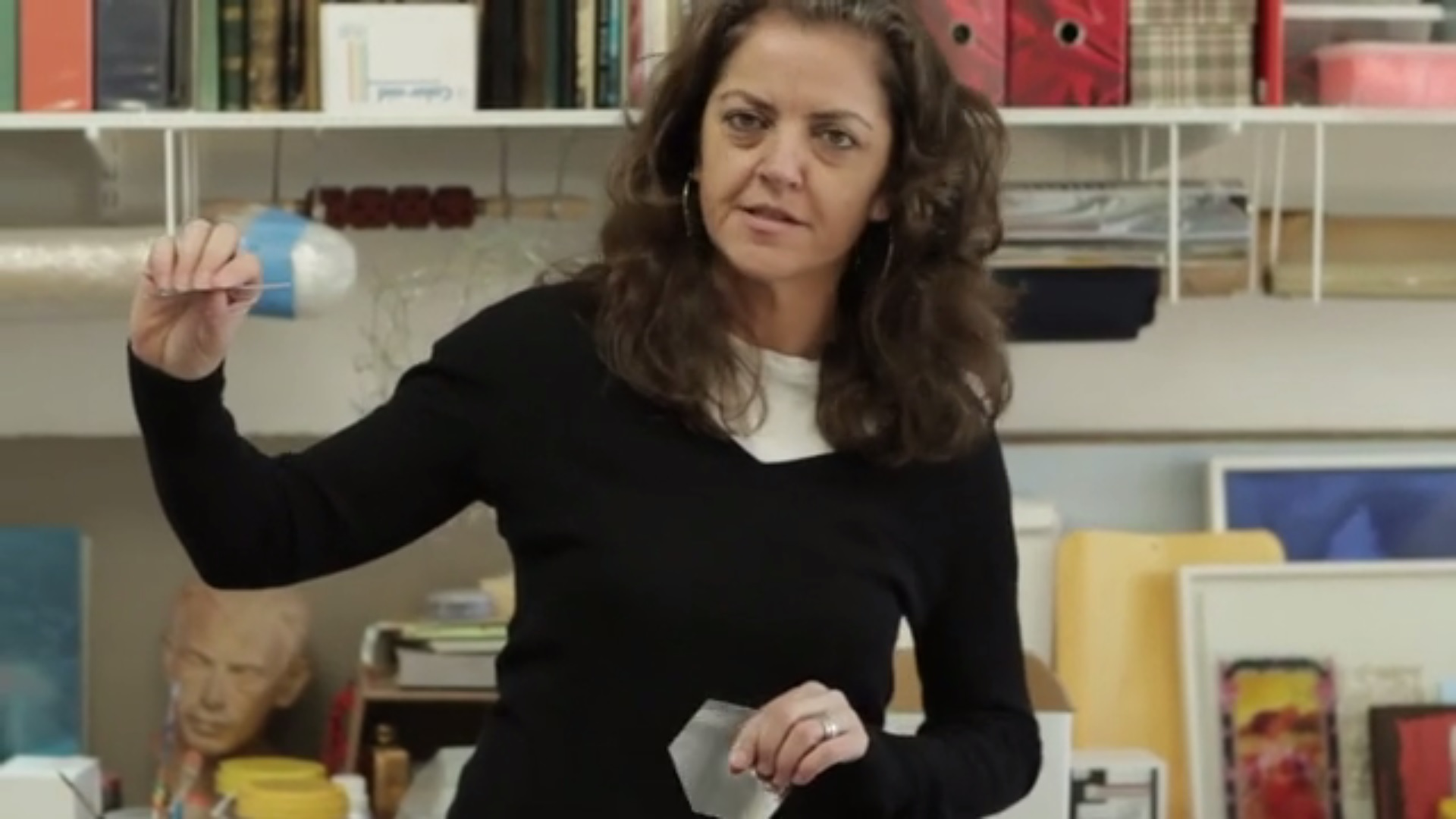
- Pae White in her studio, 2011
- Born: 1963 (age 62–63); Pasadena, California
- Website: https://paewhite.com/

Pae White (born 1963) is an American multimedia visual artist known for her unique portrayal of nature and mundane objects through her creations of suspended mobiles. She currently lives and works between Sonoma County and Los Angeles, California.

== Early life and education ==
Pae White was born in 1963 in Pasadena, California. She frequently visited Sea Ranch, California as a child, which has largely informed her work. White attained a Bachelor of Arts degree from Scripps College in 1985. In 1990, she studied at the Skowhegan School of Painting and Sculpture. White attained a Master of Fine Art from the Art Center College of Design in Pasadena, California in 1991.

== Work ==
THE Magic Carpet (2012) is suspended above the passengers of Berlin Brandenburg Airport Terminal 1

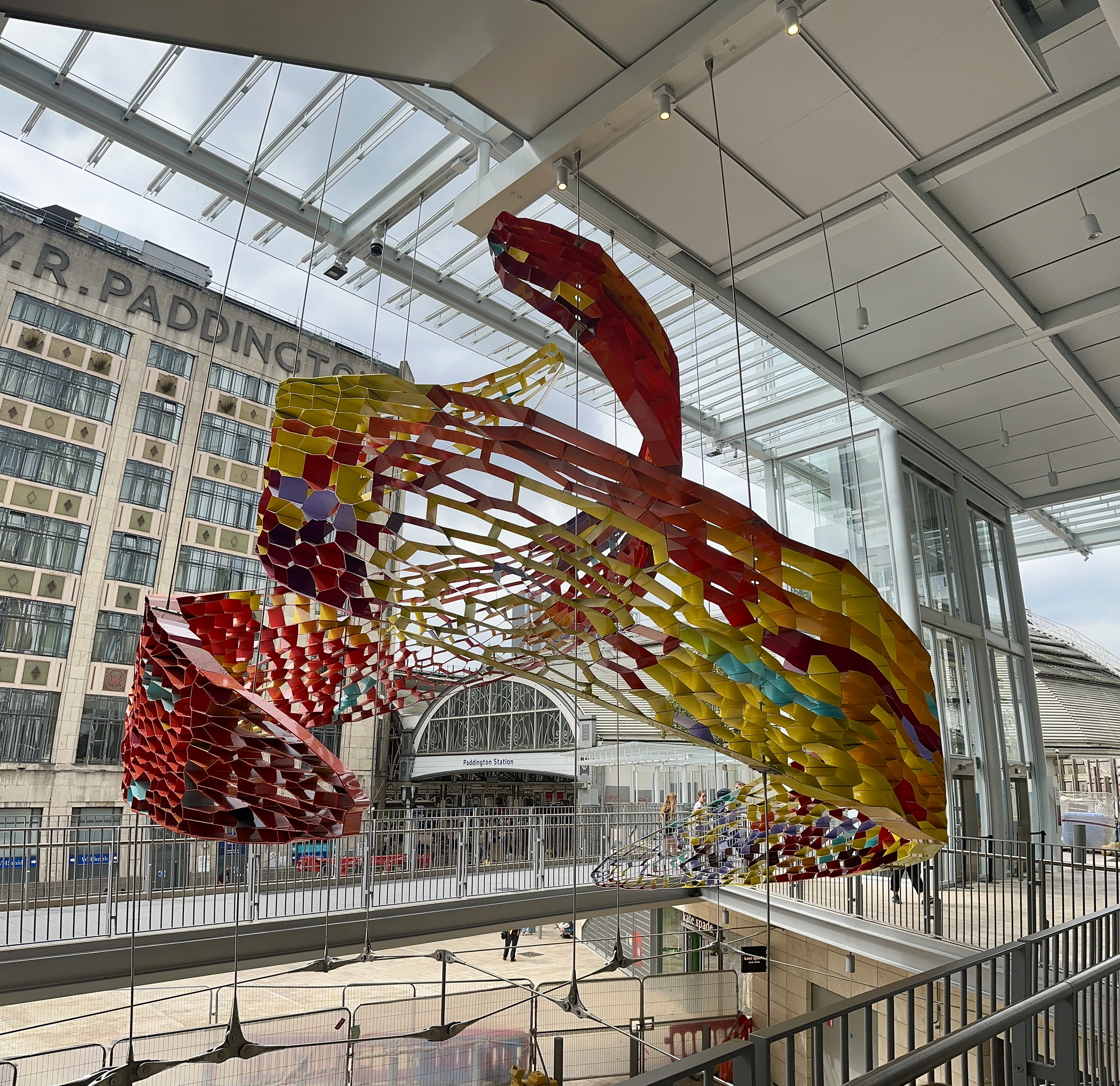
Somethinging (2024) at the mixed use Paddington Square development, London

White is a multi-media artist who frequently creates large-scale installations in various media, from tapestry to ceramics to tinfoil. Her work is said to "merge art, design, craft, and architecture," and it has been called both abstract and surreal. She is specifically known to work with yarn, cardboard, and mirror fragments to create suspended mobile sculptures. Some of her pieces are commissioned, and many are site-specific. She has been active through numerous solo and group exhibitions since 1990. Notable for her unusual use of space, White's work has been featured in a range of non-exhibition spaces, including the bookshop window at Galerie Buchholz and a children's learning area at the Los Angeles County Museum of Art.

A past exhibition from the Hammer Museum in Los Angeles included a set of Pae's mobiles that she created using colorful pieces of paper hung on multicolored strings. She often draws inspiration from nature and represents elements like fish, birds, and ponds in her works. She is known to observe the ordinary and often overlooked objects of everyday life and use them in her pieces. Artists like Alexander Calder and Sister Corita primarily influence her work.

White created a non-mobile piece titled Smoke Knows in 2009 that consists of a large tapestry expressing her interpretation of photographs of smoke. At this time in her career, White drew inspiration from smoke, creating numerous pieces. One source states that the recurring use of the smoke motif through her works represents her fascination with the ordinary and allows for exploration of the curves and various shades found within its clouds. The San Francisco Museum of Modern Art acquired this piece in 2010, identifying that the tapestry is made of cotton and polyester.

Of the concept behind her work, White has said:

"For the last several years, my practice has focused on exploring the neglected, the forgotten, the spaces between things, even the things between things. I am equally drawn to the temporary, fleeting, and ephemera of everyday life. My work has attempted to subvert the viewer's expected relationship to an everyday object, nudging them off balance, encouraging a deeper look."

Notable cities where she has pieces on display include Los Angeles, San Francisco, Münster, London, Berlin, Venice, Manchester, Washington D.C., and Melbourne.

=== Select exhibitions ===
- Directions: Virgil Marti and Pae White, Hirshhorn Museum and Sculpture Garden (2007)
- Smoke Knows (2009)
- Venice Biennale (2009)
- Whitney Biennial (2010)
- Sumer XX, The Fabric Workshop and Museum(2012)
- Too Much Night, Again, South London Gallery (2013)
- In love with tomorrow, Langen Foundation, Neuss (2013)
- ORLLEGRO, MAK – Österreichisches Museum für angewandte Kunst/Gegenwartskunst, Wien (2013)
- "Genau or Never", Greengrassi (2014)
- "Special No. 127", Neugerriemschneider (2014)
- "… and then you know what?", Kaufmann Repetto (2014)
- "Command-Shift-4", Henry Art Gallery, Seattle (2015)
- "Qwalala", Le stanze del vetro, Venice (2017)
- "demimondaine", Kaufmann Repetto (2017)
- "Spacemanship", Saarland Museum, Saarbrucken (2019)
- "Beta Space: Pae White", San Jose Museum of Art (2019)

== Awards and publications ==
Pae White has had works published in two books on women artists. In 2005, her work was featured "Women Artists in the 20th and 21st century", edited by Uta Grosenick. In 2012, "Women, Art, and Society: 5th Edition", by Whitney Chadwick noted that White's work ". . . point[s] to the rich history and legacy of the contemporary women's movement, and insure[s] that the complex histories of feminism in the visual arts of the 1st century will be carried long into the new millennium".
