= Enoura Observatory =

Art space by Hiroshi Sugimoto

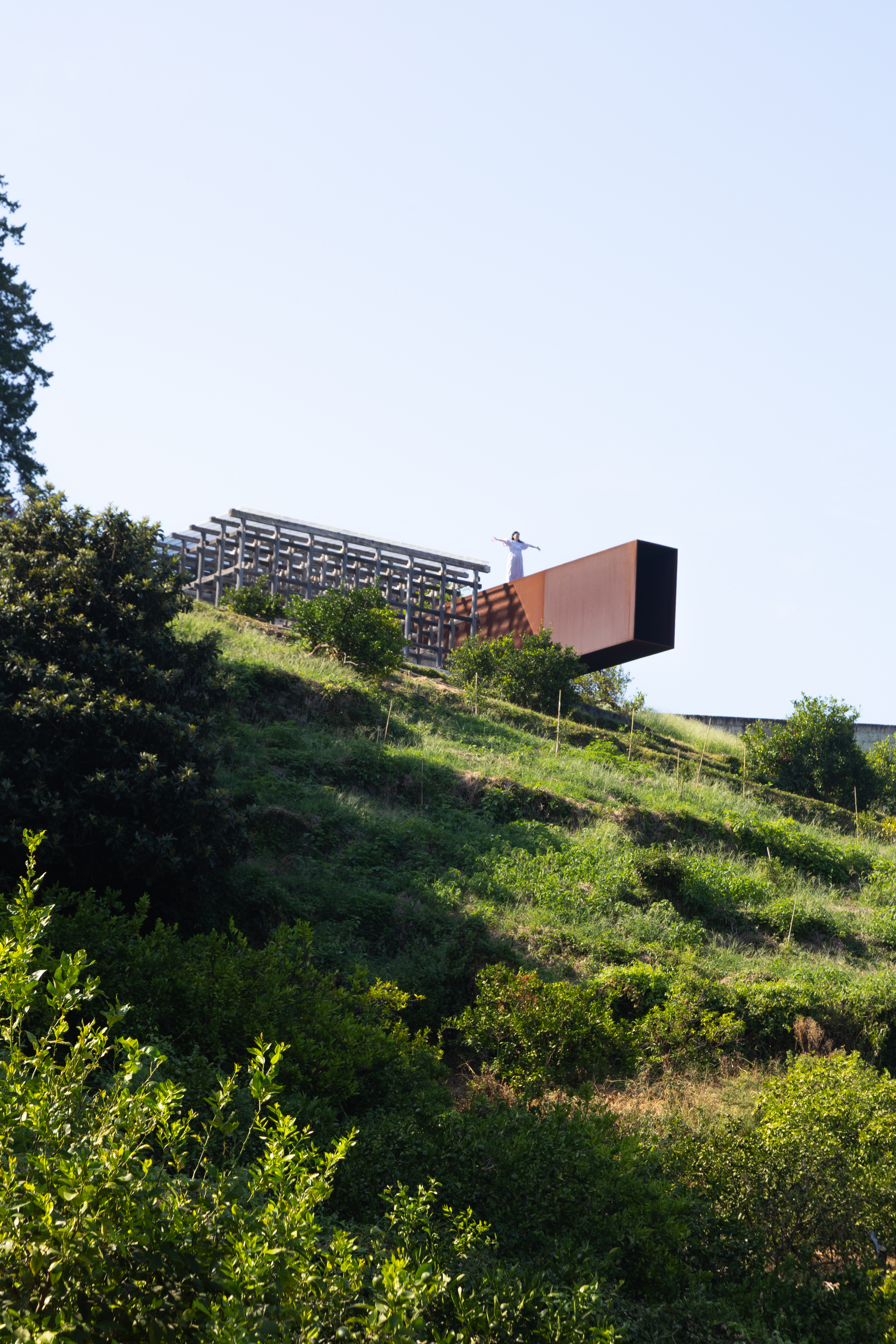
- One of the protruding hall installations at Enoura Observatory

General information
- Location: 362-1 Enoura, Odawara, Kanagawa 250-0025, Japan
- Coordinates: 35.18836962732539°N 139.13496982522284°E
- Opened: October 7, 2017

Design and construction
- Architects: Hiroshi Sugimoto, Toshiyuki Sakikida

The Enoura Observatory (江之浦測候所) is a museum and land art exhibition designed by Japanese multimedia artist Hiroshi Sugimoto and located in Odawara, Kanagawa Prefecture, Japan. Built along the hills of Odawara with principles of Heian gardening in mind, it features architecture interwoven into natural surroundings, Sugimoto's works on display, and objects of archaeological significance, among other installations. It opened in 2017 after two decades of planning.

Tokyo Weekender named the Enoura Observatory one of five beautiful museums in Japan designed by famous architects.

== Space ==
Sitting between the mountains of Hakone and Sagami Bay on a citrus grove across 60,000 square meters, the Enoura Observatory has several indoor and outdoor exhibition spaces, several outdoor stages, a teahouse, installations along various walking paths throughout the hilltop, and offices for Sugimoto's Odawara Art Foundation.

The space is also occasionally used to host other artists, exhibitions, and performances that fall in line with the Odawara Art Foundation's goal of bringing awareness to ancient history.

== History ==
Sugimoto became familiar with Odawara from a young age through various train trips, on Tokaido line, which ran between the town and the Pacific Ocean. In 2008, he founded the New Material Research Laboratory, and In 2009, he founded the Odawara Art Foundation with the goal of conveying Japanese art and culture to as wide of an audience as possible. Together, these two foundations, under Sugimoto's lead, would make plans for the Enoura Observatory.

Built in collaboration with Japanese architect Tomoyuki Sakakida, the museum opened on October 9, 2017. It had taken Sugimoto and his collaborators over 20 years to realize. Sugimoto intended it to be a space where others can also reconnect with their most primordial memories, such as one first recognizing the passage of time, as well as premodern Japanese aesthetics in general. He has considered it to be the most holistic project of his career as an artist spanning multiple disciplines and hopes that the space will "devolve beautifully into ruins of stone" in the wake of civilizational collapse.
