= Lee Ufan Museum =

Art museum in Naoshima, Japan

- 李禹煥美術館
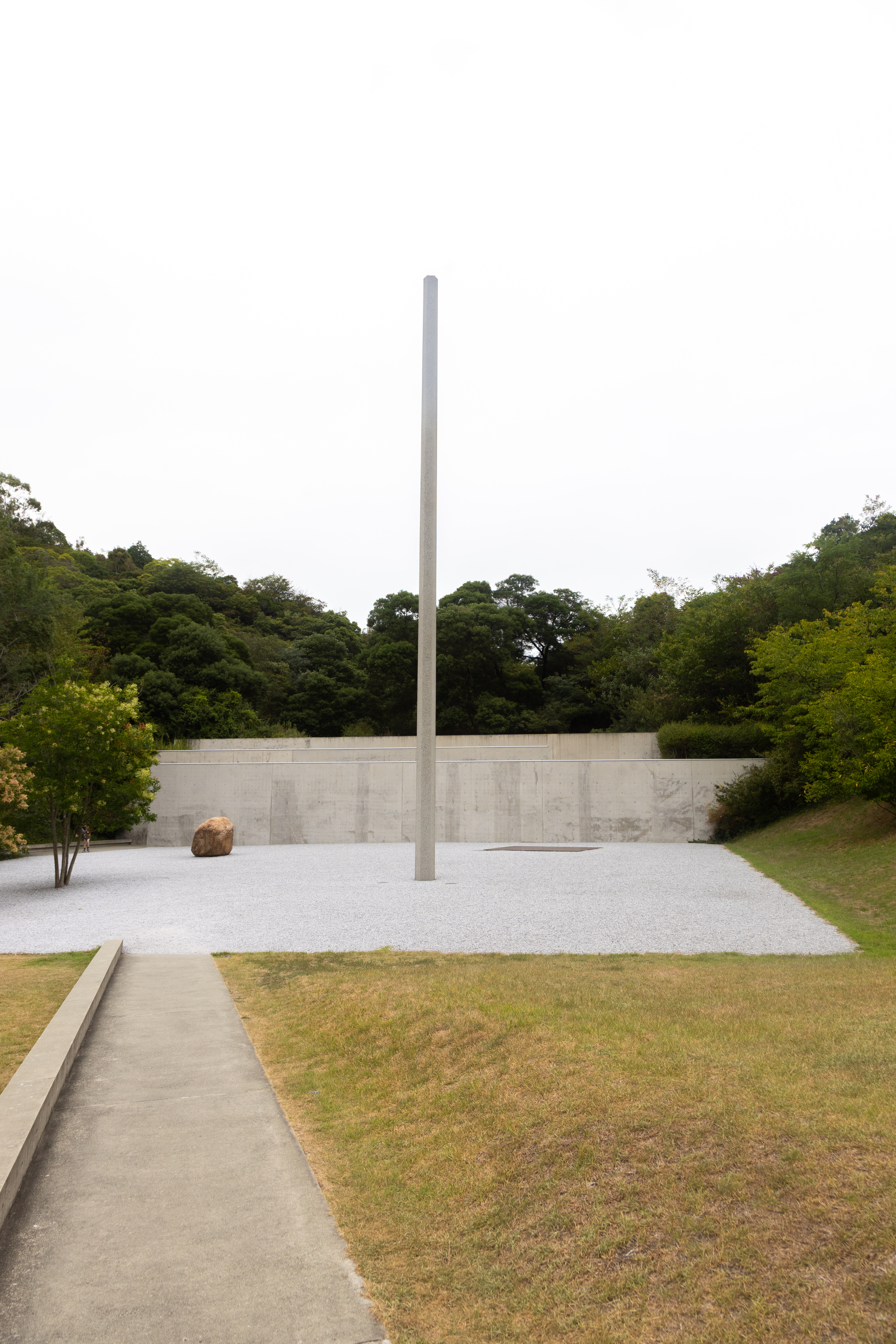
- Walkway to the museum
- Interactive map of the Lee Ufan Museum area

General information
- Location: 字倉浦1390 〒761-3110, Naoshima, Kagawa, Japan
- Coordinates: 34.44882128160816°N 133.98909583613826°E

Design and construction
- Architect: Tadao Ando

The Lee Ufan Museum (李禹煥美術館) is an art museum on Naoshima, an island of Japan, dedicated to the work of Korean artist Lee Ufan. The first-ever museum in the world of such a kind, it was designed as a collaboration between Japanese architect Tadao Ando and Lee himself.

== Design ==
Like many Ando buildings, the Lee Ufan Museum is made with large concrete walls and designed with the interplay between light and dark, as well as nature and humankind, in mind. Its minimalism is derived both from Lee and Ando's respective relationships to the sensibility. Additionally, Lee specifically wanted the building to be more vertical, having noted that Ando typically designs more horizontally focused buildings.

Located semi-underground in a valley between mountains and beside the ocean, the museum houses Lee's works in three different rooms, each with a different theme, and with different levels of light and dark. Visitors must remove their shoes upon entering.

== History ==
When first approached by Soichiro Fukutake, Lee was not originally enthusiastic about the idea of establishing a museum after his work. Eventually, Ando convinced Lee to move forward with it by presenting it as a collaborative effort between the two. Of the museum, Lee told Apollo:

The final result is not a space conceived by an architect, with the artwork installed in it afterwards. Not at all. Ando couldn't have done it on his own, nor could I. Our two sets of ideas were juxtaposed to create what you see. Fortunately, Ando is an old friend of mine, so there were no quarrels or disagreements. Our discussions went mysteriously smoothly.
