= Hiroshi Sugimoto Gallery =

Gallery on Naoshima, Japan

Hiroshi Sugimoto Gallery: Time Corridor
- 杉本博司ギャラリー 時の回廊
- Interactive map of the Hiroshi Sugimoto Gallery: Time Corridor area

General information
- Location: 積浦3418 〒761-3110, Naoshima, Kagawa, Japan
- Coordinates: 34.448607074836985°N 133.99396425909956°E

Design and construction
- Architect: Tadao Ando

The Hiroshi Sugimoto Gallery: Time Corridor (杉本博司ギャラリー 時の回廊, Sugimoto Hiroshi gyararī no kairō) is a gallery in Naoshima, Japan, featuring a wide range of the Japanese artist and photographer Hiroshi Sugimoto's works.

Like many other buildings on Naoshima, the Hiroshi Sugimoto Gallery is housed in a building designed by Japanese architect Tadao Ando; the building was formerly a part of the Benesse House Park and already showed Sugimoto's photography as of 2006, but was expanded in 2022 to accommodate more of Sugimoto's installations, as well as a lounge and many outdoor spaces.

== History ==
After Sugimoto created the Enoura Observatory in Odawara, he sought to further explore concepts regarding nature and time through more physical spaces akin to it in Japan. Decades before establishing it, Sugimoto had created and been involved with many projects on Naoshima since the early days of its Benesse Art Site in the 1990s; examples include Seascapes, shown at the Benesse House Museum since 1994, as well as the Go'o Shrine completed in 2002. Akiko Miki, the International Artistic Director of Benesse Art Site, stated that Sugimoto's early commitment to Naoshima had been the precursor to his eventual creation of the Enoura Observatory. Thus, he intended to create a site there to connect the two places central to his career and art practice.

On October 9, 2021, a Benesse Art Site press conference was held, with both Sugimoto and Ando in attendance, to unveil plans for new works and galleries on Naoshima. Already, Sugimoto's photography was exhibited in a facility of the Benesse House Park as of 2006, but plans were arranged to expand the facility even further to showcase a wider range of Sugimoto's work across his career. An official announcement for the new Hiroshi Sugimoto Gallery was made in November.

Subsequently, the gallery on Naoshima's Benesse Art Site opened on March 12, 2022, coinciding with the opening of the Valley Gallery nearby, which had also been designed by Ando. The opening date marked the thirtieth anniversary of the Benesse Art Site's activities on Naoshima.

As of 2022, the gallery has shown works across Sugimoto's career, including his early photographs, models of his buildings like Go'o Shrine, later projects like Opticks, sculptures such as Prism, and the Glass Tea House Mondrian, the last of which is shown outdoors. It also includes a lounge designed by the New Material Research Laboratory. Of the gallery, Miki stated that the gallery was a harmony between Ando's ambient architecture, which harmonized with nature, and Sugimoto's art, which concerned itself with the nature of time.
