= Le stanze del vetro =

Art gallery in Venice, Italy

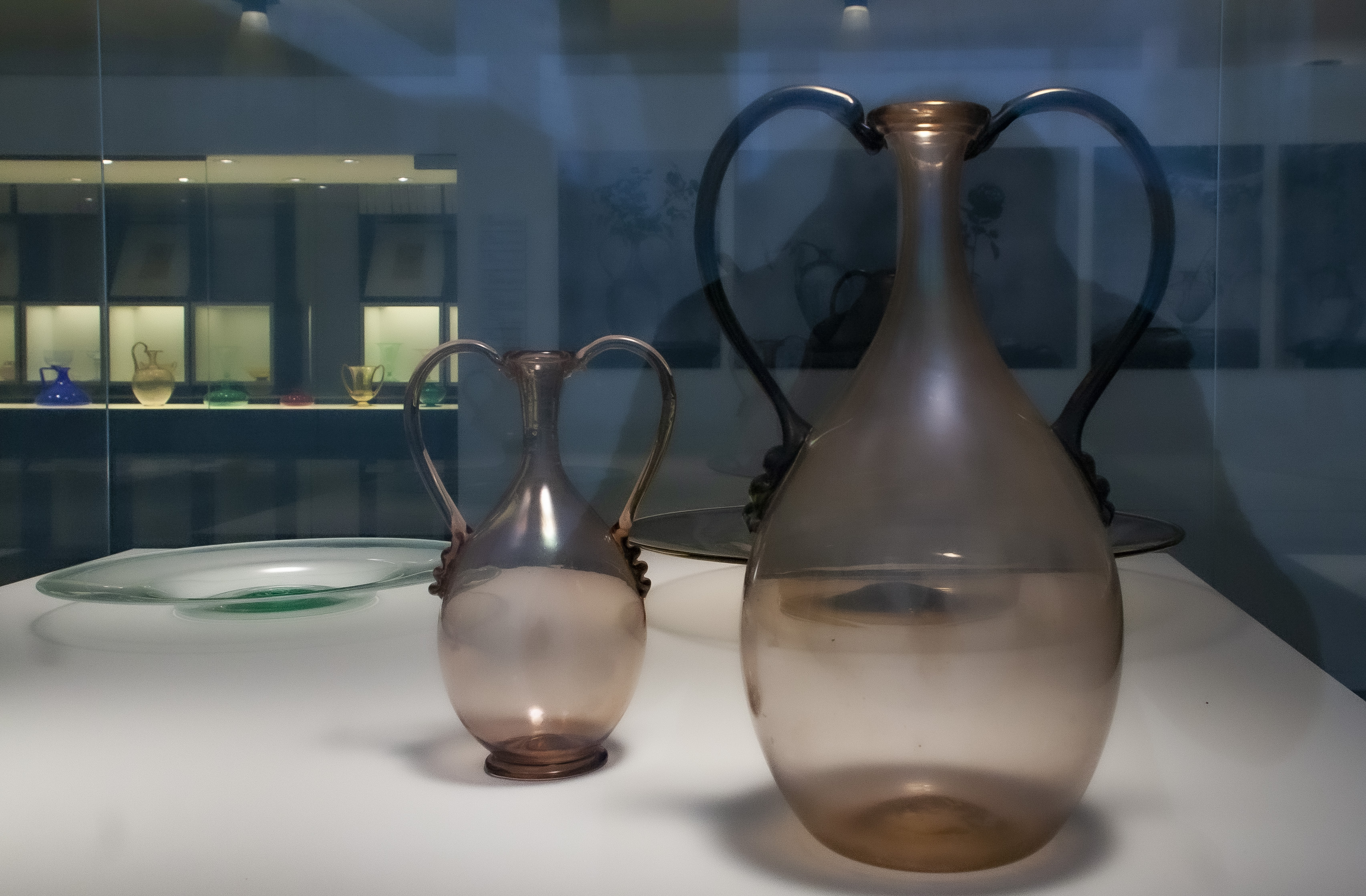
Works on display by artist Vittorio Zecchin

Le Stanze del Vetro (in English: Rooms for Glass) is a gallery located on the island of San Giorgio Maggiore in Venice, Italy with rotating exhibits of Venetian glass. It is a joint venture between the Cini Foundation and Pentagram Stiftung, a non-profit foundation established by David Landau and Marie-Rose Kahane. It is housed in a former boarding school, renovated and designed by Annabelle Selldorf.

== Mission ==
The purpose of Le Stanze del Vetro is to focus on the history and the use of glass in 20th and 21st century art to bring this medium back into the center of the attention and discussion within the international art scene. Le Stanze del Vetro has adopted a model often found in English-speaking countries of free access to museums, based on the idea that cultural heritage belongs to the community.

== Exhibitions and cultural initiatives ==
The cultural initiatives of Le Stanze del Vetro focus not only on contemporary artists who have used glass as their artistic medium, but also on the main producers and on the major glass collections in the world. For this reason, two exhibitions are staged each year on the Island of San Giorgio Maggiore. One in the spring, dedicated to the use of glass in 20th and 21st century Art and Design, the second in autumn, dedicated to the talented people who have designed objects for the Venini glassware company in the 20th century.

== Site-specific Projects ==
Alongside these initiatives, a series of special, often site-specific projects are organized involving contemporary artists (Swiss artist Not Vital in 2013 and Japanese artist Hiroshi Sugimoto in 2014), who are invited to work with glass, either prefabricated or specially produced by craftsmen from Venice. The result is a large site-specific installation, coupled with the design of a small limited-edition object produced in Murano and sold at the Le Stanze del Vetro bookshop to support the activities organized and promoted by Le Stanze del Vetro.

== Study Centre ==
Le Stanze del Vetro has set up a Study Centre dedicated to research in the field of artistic glass, together with a general archive of Venetian glass, a series of scholarships specifically addressed to researchers interested in the topic and a series of seminars, conferences and workshops for scholars and artists interested in the history, technology and development of the art of glassmaking.
