= Naoshima =

Naoshima 直島町
- Town
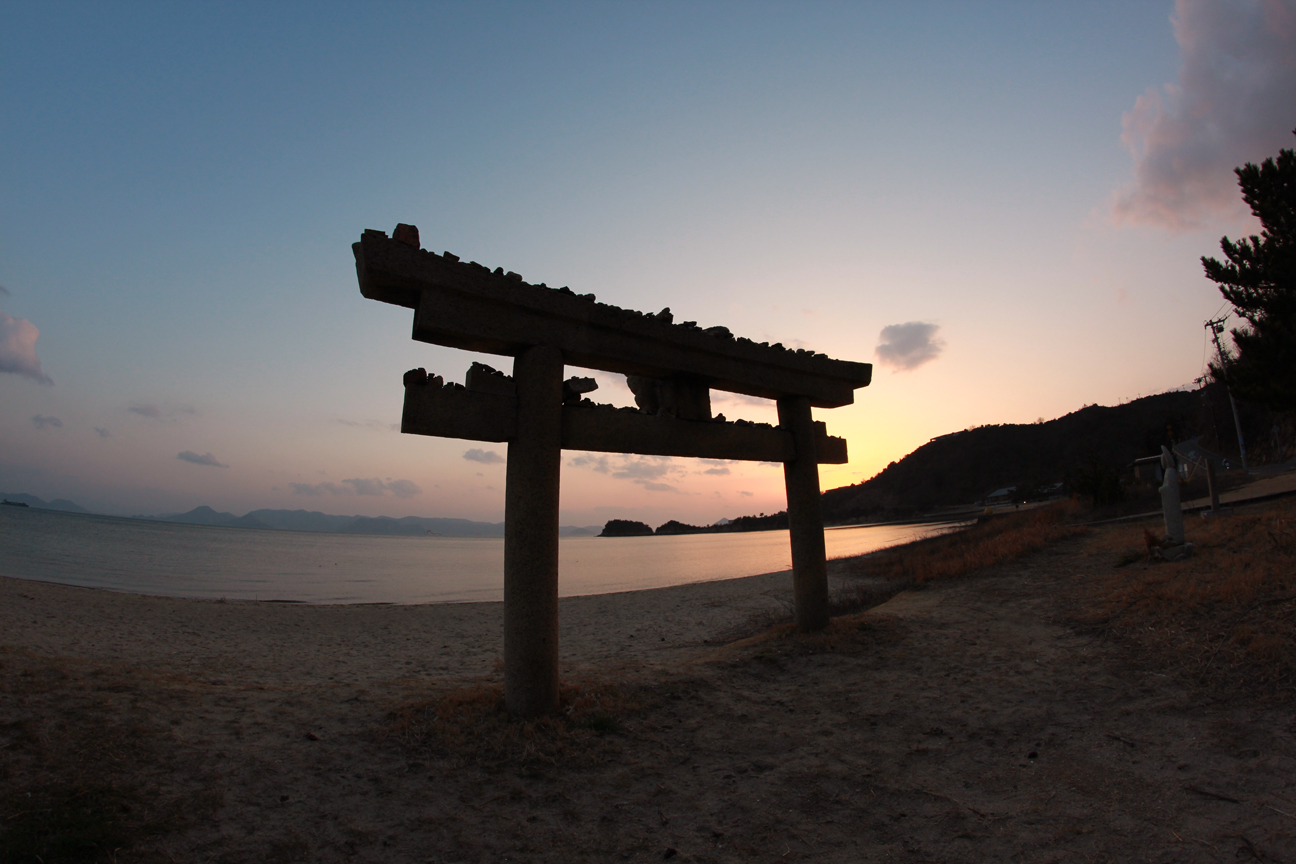
- Beachside Torii on the southern part of the island

- Flag Chapter

- Location of Naoshima in Kagawa Prefecture

- Location in Japan
- Coordinates: 34°27′30″N 133°59′00″E
- Country: Japan
- Region: Shikoku
- Prefecture: Kagawa Prefecture
- District: Kagawa

Government
  - Mayor: Shin'ichi Kobayashi

Area
  - Total: 14.22 km^{2} (5.49 sq mi)

Population (2020)
  - Total: 3,026
  - Density: 212.8/km^{2} (551.1/sq mi)
- Time zone: UTC+09:00 (JST)
- Website: www.town.naoshima.lg.jp

Naoshima (直島, Naoshima) is an island in Japan's Seto Inland Sea, part of Kagawa Prefecture. The island is best known for its many contemporary art installations and museums. The Town of Naoshima (直島町, Naoshima-chō) administers Naoshima and 26 smaller islands nearby. As of 2020, the town has an estimated population of 3,026 and a density of 210 persons per km^{2}. The total area is 14.22 km^{2}.

Naoshima Island is known for its many contemporary art museums. For example, the Chichu Art Museum (literally, "in the earth") houses a number of site-specific installations by James Turrell, Walter De Maria, and paintings by Claude Monet. Designed by Tadao Ando, it is located on one of the highest points of the island, and various exhibits and facets of the museum's architecture take advantage of its commanding view. Another contemporary museum (and hotel) is Benesse House, also by Ando. Another is the Naoshima Fukutake Art Museum, with an outdoor sculpture garden, and a third is the James Bond museum, inspired by the island's use as one of the settings for the 2002 Bond novel The Man with the Red Tattoo by Raymond Benson.

The museums and beauty of the island draw many tourists, whose visits help support the local economy. However, it is Mitsubishi Materials, loosely affiliated with other Japanese companies of the Mitsubishi name, that dominates industry on the island, as Naoshima has been the site of massive refining by Mitsubishi since 1917.

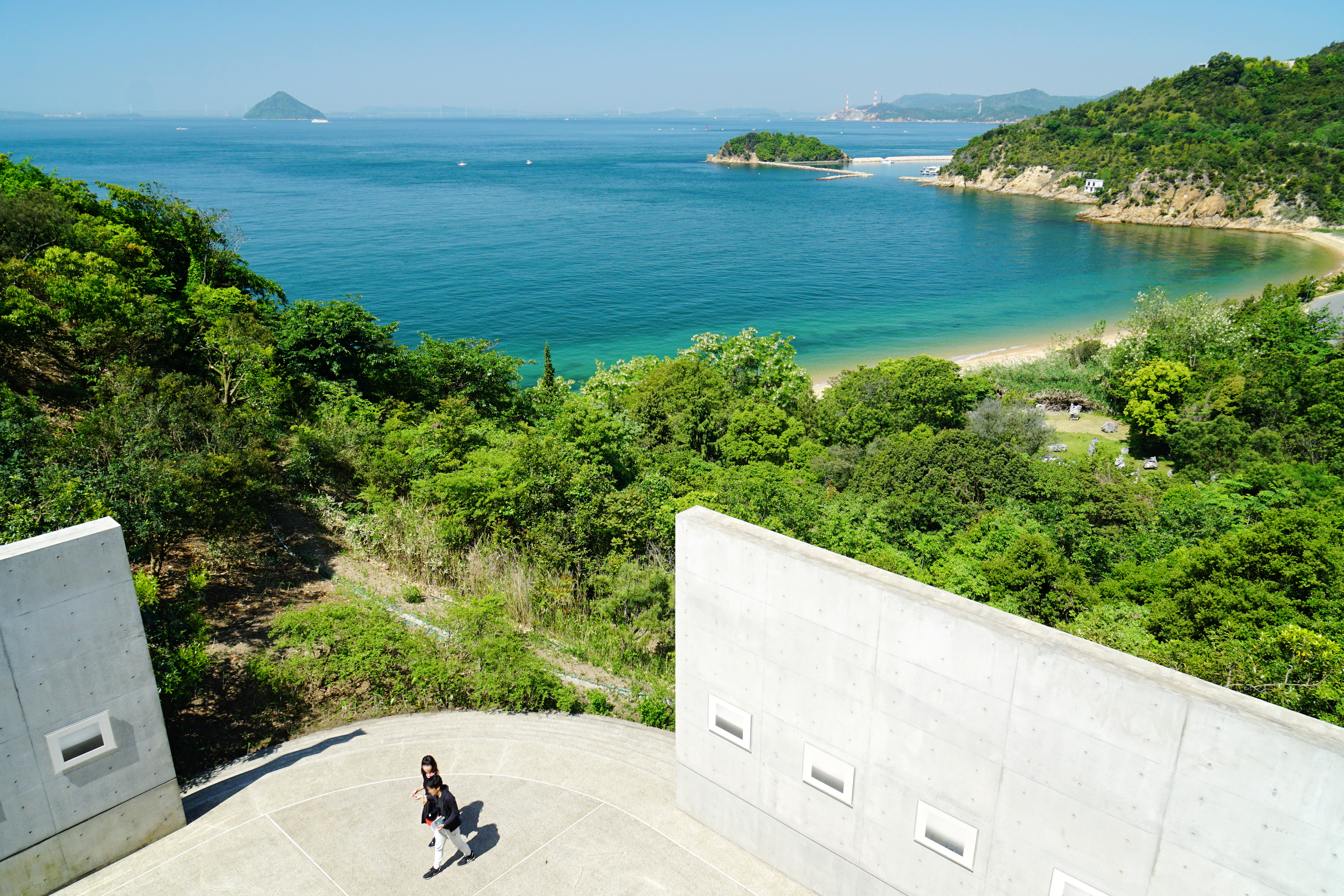
Benesse Art Site Naoshima

Benesse Corporation (one of the largest education companies in Japan and based in Okayama) has directed the creation and operation of the island's museums and other projects since the late 1980s.

== Town of Naoshima and nearby islands ==
Naoshima was made a village in 1890, and upgraded to a town in 1954. The town is part of Kagawa District. Naoshima is the sister town of Timmins, Ontario, Canada.

As of 2010, only three of the town's 27 islands are inhabited: Naoshima, Byōbujima, and Mukaejima. Ishima is also inhabited, but only in the northern portion which belongs to Okayama Prefecture.

=== Byōbujima ===
Byōbujima is a minor island north of Naoshima, close to Okayama Prefecture, with a population of 19 as of 2015.

=== Ishima ===
The second-largest island of the town, Ishima, lying northeast of Naoshima, is divided between Kagawa Prefecture in the south and Okayama Prefecture in the north. The only inhabitants are in a small settlement on the north coast, belonging to Okayama.

Ishima was divided after fishing-related disputes in the Edo period. In 2011, 87% of the island was burned in a forest fire, though the northern settlement was spared.

=== Mukaejima ===
Mukaejima is a minor island northwest of Naoshima with a population of 15 as of 2015.

== Demographics ==
Per Japanese census data, the population of Naoshima has declined over the past half-century.

Historical population
Year	Pop.	±%
1970	6,007	—
1980	5,302	−11.7%
1990	4,671	−11.9%
2000	3,705	−20.7%
2010	3,325	−10.3%
2020	3,103	−6.7%

== In popular culture ==
The fictional island of Torishirojima, which is the setting of the 2018 visual novel game Summer Pockets, was based on the island.
