= The Jesus and Mary Chain discography =

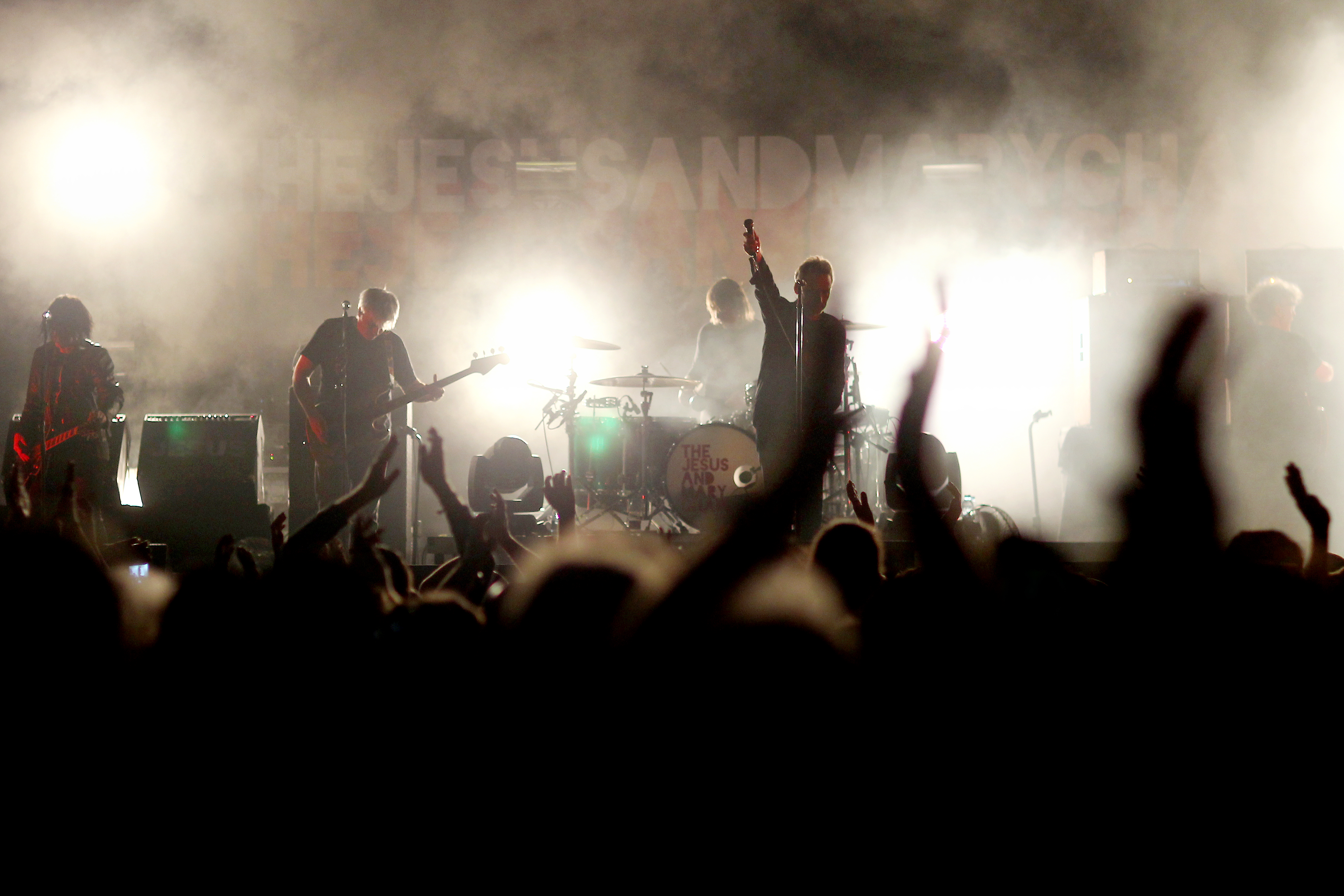
- The Jesus and Mary Chain performing in 2018
- Studio albums: 8
- Extended plays: 6
- Live albums: 3
- Compilation albums: 7
- Singles: 25
- Video albums: 2

Scottish alternative rock band The Jesus and Mary Chain have released eight studio albums, two live albums, eight compilation albums, two video albums, six extended plays and 25 singles.

== Albums ==
=== Studio albums ===
List of studio albums, with selected chart positions and certifications
Title	Details	Peak chart positions								Certifications
Title	Details	UK	AUS	CAN	NL	NZ	SWE	SWI	US	Certifications
Psychocandy	Released: 18 November 1985; Label: Blanco y Negro; Formats: CD, LP, cassette, DualDisc, digital download	31	87	92	47	35	—	—	188	BPI: Gold
Darklands	Released: 31 August 1987; Label: Blanco y Negro; Formats: CD, LP, cassette, DualDisc, digital download	5	81	—	64	20	38	23	161	BPI: Gold
Automatic	Released: 9 October 1989; Label: Blanco y Negro; Formats: CD, LP, cassette, DualDisc, digital download	11	89	—	—	48	42	—	105	BPI: Silver
Honey's Dead	Released: 22 March 1992; Label: Blanco y Negro; Formats: CD, LP, cassette, DualDisc, digital download	14	44	83	—	21	41	—	158	
Stoned & Dethroned	Released: 23 August 1994; Label: Blanco y Negro; Formats: CD, LP, cassette, DualDisc, digital download	13	27	43	—	—	19	—	98	
Munki	Released: 1 June 1998; Label: Creation; Formats: CD, LP, cassette, digital download	47	—	—	—	—	49	—	—	
Damage and Joy	Released: 24 March 2017; Label: Artificial Plastic; Formats: CD, LP, cassette, digital download	16	72	—	140	—	—	43	—	
Glasgow Eyes	Released: 22 March 2024; Label: Fuzz Club; Formats: CD, 33 1/3 RPM LP, 45 RPM 2xLP, cassette, digital download	7	—	—	—	—	—	33	—	
"—" denotes a recording that did not chart or was not released in that territory.

=== Live albums ===
Title	Details
Live in Concert	Released: 26 May 2003; Label: Strange Fruit; Format: CD
Psychocandy Live: Barrowlands	Released: 31 July 2015; Label: Demon; Formats: CD, LP, digital download
Sunset 666	Released: 4 August 2023; Label: Fuzz Club; Formats: CD, LP, digital download

=== Compilation albums ===
List of compilation albums, with selected chart positions and certifications
Title	Details	Peak chart positions				Certifications
Title	Details	UK	AUS	NZ	US	Certifications
Barbed Wire Kisses	Released: 18 April 1988; Label: Blanco y Negro; Formats: CD, LP, cassette, digital download	9	97	29	192	BPI: Gold
The Sound of Speed	Released: 12 July 1993; Label: Blanco y Negro; Formats: CD, LP, cassette	15	164	—	—	
Hate Rock 'N' Roll	Released: September 1995; Label: American; Formats: CD, cassette	—	—	—	—	
The Complete John Peel Sessions	Released: 28 February 2000; Label: Strange Fruit; Formats: CD, LP	—	—	—	—	
21 Singles	Released: July 2002; Label: Warner Strategic Marketing; Formats: CD, digital download	117	—	—	—	BPI: Silver
The Power of Negative Thinking: B-Sides & Rarities	Released: 30 September 2008; Label: Rhino; Formats: CD, digital download	—	—	—	—	
Upside Down: The Best of The Jesus and Mary Chain	Released: 27 September 2010; Label: Music Club Deluxe, Rhino; Format: CD	—	—	—	—	
The Complete Vinyl Collection	Released: 2 December 2013; Label: Demon; Format: LP	—	—	—	—	
"—" denotes a recording that did not chart or was not released in that territory.

== Extended plays ==
List of extended plays, with selected chart positions
Title	Details	Peak chart positions		
Title	Details	UK	IRE	NZ
Some Candy Talking	Released: July 1986; Label: Blanco y Negro; Formats: 7-inch, 12-inch	13	11	37
Happy When It Rains	Released: August 1987; Label: Blanco y Negro; Format: 10-inch	25	25	—
Darklands	Released: November 1987; Label: Blanco y Negro; Formats: CD, 10-inch	33	23	—
Rollercoaster	Released: September 1990; Label: Blanco y Negro; Formats: CD, 7-inch, 12-inch	46	25	28
The Peel Sessions	Released: September 1991; Label: Strange Fruit; Formats: CD, LP, cassette	—	—	—
Sound of Speed	Released: July 1993; Label: Blanco y Negro; Formats: CD, 7-inch, 10-inch, cassette	30	—	—
"—" denotes a recording that did not chart or was not released in that territory.

== Singles ==
List of singles, with selected chart positions, showing year released and album name
Title	Year	Peak chart positions						Album
Title	Year	UK	AUS	IRE	NZ	US	US Alt.	Album
"Upside Down"	1984	164	—	—	—	—	—	Non-album single
"Never Understand"	1985	47	—	—	—	—	—	Psychocandy
"You Trip Me Up"	1985	55	—	—	—	—	—	Psychocandy
"Just Like Honey"	1985	45	—	—	—	—	—	Psychocandy
"Some Candy Talking"	1986	13	—	11	37	—	—	Non-album single
"April Skies"	1987	8	—	6	16	—	—	Darklands
"Happy When It Rains"	1987	25	—	15	—	—	—	Darklands
"Darklands"	1987	33	—	23	—	—	—	Darklands
"Sidewalking"	1988	30	—	20	23	—	—	Barbed Wire Kisses
"Surfin' U.S.A." (Summer Mix)	1988	—	—	—	36	—	—	Barbed Wire Kisses
"Blues from a Gun"	1989	32	—	15	—	—	1	Automatic
"Head On"	1990	57	102	—	—	—	2	Automatic
"Rollercoaster"	1990	46	110	25	28	—	—	Honey's Dead
"Reverence"	1992	10	—	21	—	—	—	Honey's Dead
"Far Gone and Out"	1992	23	88	—	—	—	3	Honey's Dead
"Almost Gold"	1992	41	—	—	—	—	13	Honey's Dead
"Sometimes Always"	1994	22	62	—	—	96	4	Stoned & Dethroned
"Come On"	1994	52	131	—	—	—	—	Stoned & Dethroned
"I Hate Rock 'n' Roll"	1995	61	123	—	—	—	—	Hate Rock 'N' Roll
"Cracking Up"	1998	35	153	—	—	—	—	Munki
"I Love Rock 'n' Roll"	1998	38	—	—	—	—	—	Munki
"Amputation"	2016	—	—	—	—	—	—	Damage and Joy
"Always Sad"	2017	—	—	—	—	—	—	Damage and Joy
"Jamcod"	2023	—	—	—	—	—	—	Glasgow Eyes
"Chemical Animal"	2024	—	—	—	—	—	—	Glasgow Eyes
"Girl 71"	2024	—	—	—	—	—	—	Glasgow Eyes
"Pop Seeds"	2024	—	—	—	—	—	—	Non-album single
"—" denotes a recording that did not chart or was not released in that territory.

== Other charted songs ==
List of other charted songs, with selected chart positions, showing year released and album name
Title	Year	Peaks	Album
Title	Year	US Alt.	Album
"Sugar Ray"	1992	22	Honey's Dead

== Video albums ==
Title	Details
The Jesus and Mary Chain	Released: 31 October 1988; Label: Blanco y Negro; Format: VHS
Videos 1985 to 1989	Released: 1990; Label: Warner Reprise Video; Formats: VHS, DVD, LaserDisc
