= Upside Down: The Best of The Jesus and Mary Chain =

Greatest hits album by The Jesus and Mary Chain
- Released: 27 September 2010
- Recorded: 1984–2008
- Genre: Alternative rock, noise pop
- Label: Music Club Deluxe

The Jesus and Mary Chain chronology
The Power of Negative Thinking: B-Sides & Rarities (2008)	Upside Down: The Best of The Jesus and Mary Chain (2010)	The Complete Vinyl Collection (2013)

Upside Down: The Best of The Jesus and Mary Chain is a greatest hits album by Scottish alternative rock band, the Jesus and Mary Chain. It was released on 27 September 2010 via Music Club Deluxe.

The album contains various key tracks from the band's discography, including their singles and a number of rare B-sides, alternative versions and live cuts. Rare songs featured in the albums include the band's reunion song, "All Things Must Pass", which was recorded for the television series "Heroes" in 2008, an alternative version of "33 1/3", "45 RPM", which appeared on 104.9: An XFM Compilation Album and a re-recording of "The Hardest Walk", which originally appeared on the soundtrack of "Some Kind Of Wonderful".

== Reception ==
Professional ratings
Review scores
Source	Rating
AllMusic	4.5/5 stars
Daily Express	4/5 stars
The Quietus	favourable
The Skinny	4/5 stars

Andy Kellman of AllMusic gave the album a positive review, stating: "Upside Down might seem like too much for casual fans, but it retails for the price of a single disc and functions as a thorough, accurate representation of the band’s discography." PJ Meiklem of The Skinny wrote: "The evolution between 1984’s debut single Upside Down and All Things Must Pass (the only new material released since reforming in 2007) may be clear, but it’s not so marked as to drag you through a 44-song-journey to chart it."

Julian Marszalek of The Quietus praised the album, commenting: "Splendidly mastered to boost the fuzz that fizzes throughout the Jesus and Mary Chain’s three chord gems, Upside Down… is a great introduction for anyone seeking an alternative to received wisdom erroneously taken as fact, as well as a timely reminder of Reidian greatness for any lapsed apostles." Johnny Dee of Classic Rock magazine also wrote: "unchronological, Upside Down doesn’t tell the story of The Mary Chain’s transformation from Creation Records agent provocateurs to gothic pop stars to rock’n’roll class act. Instead it darts between eras and demonstrates the breadth of their career."

Robert Spellman of Daily Express described the album as "a useful 44-track gathering of JAMC material spanning the Reid brothers' recording output from 1984 to 2008."

== Track listing ==
All tracks are written by Jim Reid and William Reid, except where noted.

Disc 1
No.	Title	Album	Length
1.	"Just Like Honey"	Psychocandy
2.	"April Skies"	Darklands
3.	"Blues from a Gun"	Automatic
4.	"Far Gone and Out"	Honey's Dead
5.	"Some Candy Talking"	Some Candy Talking EP
6.	"Come On"	Stoned & Dethroned
7.	"Head On"	Automatic
8.	"I Love Rock 'n' Roll"	Munki
9.	"All Things Must Pass"	Heroes: Original Soundtrack
10.	"Reverence"	Honey's Dead
11.	"Sidewalking"	Non-album single
12.	"Cracking Up"	Munki
13.	"Upside Down"	Non-album single
14.	"Never Understand"	Psychocandy
15.	"The Hardest Walk"	Psychocandy
16.	"Happy When It Rains"	Darklands
17.	"Sometimes Always"	Stoned & Dethroned
18.	"The Perfect Crime"	Sometimes Always
19.	"Almost Gold"	Honey's Dead
20.	"Darklands"	Darklands
21.	"45 RPM"	104.9: An XFM Compilation Album
22.	"Head"	Just Like Honey

Disc 2
No.	Title	Writer(s)	Album	Length
1.	"Half Way To Crazy"		Automatic
2.	"You Trip Me Up"		Psychocandy
3.	"Rollercoaster"		Rollercoaster EP
4.	"Birthday"		Munki
5.	"Happy Place"		Happy When It Rains
6.	"Something I Can't Have"		Sound of Speed
7.	"I Hate Rock 'n' Roll"		Munki
8.	"Tower of Song" (Leonard Cohen cover)	Leonard Cohen	Rollercoaster EP
9.	"Vegetable Man" (Pink Floyd cover)	Syd Barrett	Upside Down
10.	"In A Hole"		Psychocandy
11.	"Kill Surf City"		April Skies
12.	"33 1/3"		I Hate Rock 'n' Roll
13.	"Cherry Came Too"		Darklands
14.	"Between Planets"		Automatic
15.	"Moe Tucker"		Munki
16.	"Little Stars"		Sometimes Always
17.	"God Help Me"		Stoned & Dethroned
18.	"New York City"		Come On
19.	"Nine Million Rainy Days"		Darklands
20.	"Drop"		Automatic
21.	"Black"		Munki
22.	"Psychocandy"		Some Candy Talking EP

== Personnel ==
The Jesus and Mary Chain

- Jim Reid – vocals, guitar, production
- William Reid – vocals, guitar, production
