= The Complete Vinyl Collection =

Box set by The Jesus and Mary Chain
- Released: 2 December 2013
- Genre: Alternative rock
- Label: Demon Music Group

The Jesus and Mary Chain chronology
Upside Down: The Best of The Jesus and Mary Chain (2010)	The Complete Vinyl Collection (2013)	Psychocandy Live: Barrowlands (2015)

Professional ratings
Review scores
Source	Rating
Clash	9/10

The Complete Vinyl Collection is a box set release by Scottish alternative rock band, The Jesus and Mary Chain. It was released on 12 December 2013 via Demon Music Group, marking the band's 30th anniversary.

== Contents ==
The box set includes the band's six studio albums, along with a live album:

- Psychocandy (1985)
- Darklands (1987)
- Automatic (1989)
- Honey’s Dead (1992)
- Stoned & Dethroned (1994)
- Munki (1998)
- Live in Concert (2003)

The box set marks the first vinyl pressing of the band's live album Live in Concert, which contains live recordings from 1992 and 1995. Other items featured on the box set include a two-LP collection of "all" the band’s BBC studio recordings, a B-sides and rarities LP with a fan-picked track list, a 32-page hardcover book with photographs, essays and interviews, and a poster, for which fans were able to upload a photo of their face for inclusion.

The BBC sessions EPs contain studio recordings from 1984–1986, 1988–1989, 1994, and 1998.

== Track listing ==
All songs written and composed by William Reid and Jim Reid, except where noted:

Psychocandy

A side
No.	Title	Length
1.	"Just Like Honey"	3:00
2.	"The Living End"	2:14
3.	"Taste the Floor"	2:54
4.	"The Hardest Walk"	2:36
5.	"Cut Dead"	2:45
6.	"In a Hole"	3:01
7.	"Taste of Cindy"	1:39

B side
No.	Title	Length
1.	"Never Understand"	2:58
2.	"Inside Me"	3:08
3.	"Sowing Seeds"	2:47
4.	"My Little Underground"	2:30
5.	"You Trip Me Up"	2:22
6.	"Something's Wrong"	4:00
7.	"It's So Hard"	2:35

Darklands

A side
No.	Title	Length
1.	"Darklands"	5:29
2.	"Deep One Perfect Morning"	2:43
3.	"Happy When It Rains"	3:36
4.	"Down On Me"	2:36
5.	"Nine Million Rainy Days"	4:29

B side
No.	Title	Length
1.	"April Skies"	4:00
2.	"Fall"	2:28
3.	"Cherry Came Too"	3:06
4.	"On The Wall"	5:05
5.	"About You"	2:31

Automatic

A side
No.	Title	Length
1.	"Here Comes Alice"	3:52
2.	"Coast To Coast"	4:13
3.	"Blues from a Gun"	4:44
4.	"Between Planets"	3:27
5.	"UV Ray"	4:04

B side
No.	Title	Length
1.	"Her Way Of Praying"	3:46
2.	"Head On"	4:11
3.	"Take It"	4:34
4.	"Half Way To Crazy"	3:41
5.	"Gimme Hell"	3:18

Honey's Dead

A side
No.	Title	Length
1.	"Reverence"	3:39
2.	"Teenage Lust"	3:05
3.	"Far Gone and Out"	2:49
4.	"Almost Gold"	3:16
5.	"Sugar Ray"	4:37
6.	"Tumbledown"	4:10

B side
No.	Title	Length
1.	"Catchfire"	4:45
2.	"Good For My Soul"	2:59
3.	"Rollercoaster"	3:44
4.	"I Can't Get Enough"	2:56
5.	"Sundown"	4:57
6.	"Frequency"	1:19

Stoned & Dethroned

A side
No.	Title	Writer(s)	Length
1.	"Dirty Water"	William Reid	3:05
2.	"Bullet Lovers"	William Reid	3:37
3.	"Sometimes Always"	William Reid	2:32
4.	"Come On"	Jim Reid	2:12
5.	"Between Us"	William Reid	2:37
6.	"Hole"	Jim Reid	2:13
7.	"Never Saw It Coming"	William Reid	3:32
8.	"She"	Jim Reid	3:06

B side
No.	Title	Writer(s)	Length
1.	"Wish I Could"	William Reid	2:40
2.	"Save Me"		2:41
3.	"Till It Shines"	William Reid	3:15
4.	"God Help Me"	William Reid	2:45
5.	"Girlfriend"	William Reid	3:15
6.	"Everybody I Know"	William Reid	2:12
7.	"You've Been A Friend"	Jim Reid	3:34
8.	"These Days"	William Reid	2:14
9.	"Feeling Lucky"	William Reid	2:15

Munki

Disc 1 – A side
No.	Title	Writer(s)	Length
1.	"I Love Rock 'n' Roll"	Jim Reid
2.	"Birthday"	William Reid
3.	"Stardust Remedy"	Jim Reid
4.	"Fizzy"	William Reid

Disc 1 – B side
No.	Title	Writer(s)	Length
1.	"Moe Tucker"	Jim Reid
2.	"Perfume"	William Reid
3.	"Virtually Unreal"	Jim Reid
4.	"Degenerate"	William Reid

Disc 2 – A side
No.	Title	Writer(s)	Length
1.	"Cracking Up"	William Reid
2.	"Commercial"	William Reid
3.	"Super Tramp"	Jim Reid
4.	"Never Understood"	William Reid

Disc 2 – B side
No.	Title	Writer(s)	Length
1.	"I Can't Find The Time For Times"	William Reid
2.	"Man On The Moon"	Jim Reid
3.	"Black"	William Reid
4.	"Dream Lover"	Jim Reid
5.	"I Hate Rock 'n' Roll"	William Reid
