= The Sound of Speed =

Compilation album by The Jesus and Mary Chain
- Released: 25 October 1992 (Japan); 12 July 1993 (Worldwide)
- Recorded: 1988–1993
- Genre: Alternative rock
- Length: 74:11
- Label: Blanco y Negro
- Producer: Jim Reid, William Reid

The Jesus and Mary Chain chronology
Honey's Dead (1992)	The Sound of Speed (1992)	Stoned & Dethroned (1994)

Professional ratings
Review scores
Source	Rating
AllMusic	4/5 stars
The Encyclopedia of Popular Music	3/5 stars
NME	7/10

The Sound of Speed is a compilation of singles and rare tracks by Scottish alternative rock band The Jesus and Mary Chain.

The track listing below is for the version released in most of the world - the Japanese version dropped "Snakedriver", "Something I Can't Have", "Write Record Release Blues", "Tower of Song", "Little Red Rooster", "Lowlife" and "Reverberation", but added "Subway", "In the Black", "Terminal Beach" and "I'm Glad I Never".

It reached #15 on the UK albums chart.

== Critical reception ==
The Independent gave the compilation a mixed review, writing that "the most interesting tracks here are the cover versions of songs like 'Guitarman' (Elvis done in the vein of Dylan), 'Little Red Rooster', and Leonard Cohen's 'Tower of Song', whose exhausted languor makes a surprisingly smooth transfer to Mary Chain mode".

== Track listing ==
All songs written by Jim Reid and William Reid, except where noted.

=== LP (4509-93104-1) Worldwide ===
Side 1

1. "Snakedriver" – 3:44
2. "Reverence (radio mix)" – 5:39
3. "Heat" – 3:00
4. "Teenage Lust (acoustic version)" – 2:25
5. "Why'd You Want Me?" – 3:15
6. "Don't Come Down" – 2:39
7. "Guitarman" (Jerry Reed) – 3:43
8. "Something I Can't Have" – 3:02

Side 2

1. "Sometimes" – 2:53
2. "Write Record Release Blues" – 2:58
3. "Shimmer" – 2:46
4. "Penetration" – 2:48
5. "My Girl" (Smokey Robinson) – 3:05
6. "Tower of Song" (Leonard Cohen) – 4:49
7. "Little Red Rooster" (Willie Dixon) – 3:25
8. "Break Me Down" – 2:29
9. "Lowlife" – 3:27

=== CD (4509-93104-2) Worldwide ===
1. "Snakedriver" – 3:44
2. "Reverence (radio mix)" – 5:39
3. "Heat" – 3:00
4. "Teenage Lust (acoustic version)" – 2:25
5. "Why'd You Want Me?" – 3:15
6. "Don't Come Down" – 2:39
7. "Guitarman" (Jerry Reed) – 3:43
8. "Something I Can't Have" – 3:02
9. "Sometimes" – 2:53
10. "Write Record Release Blues" – 2:58
11. "Shimmer" – 2:46
12. "Penetration" – 2:48
13. "My Girl" (Robinson) – 3:05
14. "Tower of Song" (Cohen) – 4:49
15. "Little Red Rooster" (Burnett, Dixon) – 3:25
16. "Break Me Down" – 2:29
17. "Lowlife" – 3:27
18. "Deviant Slice" – 3:01
19. "Reverberation" (Roky Erickson, Tommy Hall, Stacy Sutherland) – 3:46
20. "Sidewalking (extended version)" – 7:52

Original releases

- Track 20: Non-album single "Sidewalking" from 1988.
- Tracks 11, 12, 13, 16: B-sides to "Blues from a Gun" from 1989.
- Track 18: B-side to "Head On" from 1989.
- Tracks 14, 17: Part of Rollercoaster EP from 1990.
- Tracks 2, 3, 7: B-sides to "Reverence" from 1992
- Tracks 5, 9: B-sides to "Far Gone and Out" from 1992.
- Tracks 4, 6, 19: B-sides to "Almost Gold" from 1992.
- Tracks 1, 8, 10, 15: Part of Sound of Speed EP from 1993.

=== CD (WMC5-520) Japan ===
1. "Reverence (radio mix)" – 5:39
2. "Teenage Lust (acoustic version)" – 2:25
3. "Don't Come Down" – 2:39
4. "Heat" – 3:03
5. "Guitarman" (Jerry Reed) – 3:43
6. "Why'd You Want Me?" – 3:15
7. "Sometimes" – 2:53
8. "Shimmer" – 2:46
9. "Penetration" – 2:48
10. "My Girl" (Robinson) – 3:05
11. "Subway" – 2:07
12. "In the Black" – 2:56
13. "Break Me Down" – 2:29
14. "Terminal Beach" – 2:26
15. "Deviant Slice" – 3:01
16. "Glad I Never" – 1:31
17. "Sidewalking (extended version)" – 7:52

== Personnel ==
=== The Jesus and Mary Chain ===
- Jim Reid – vocals, guitar, production
- William Reid – vocals, guitar, production, engineer (tracks 11 to 14, 16, 18, 19)
- Ben Lurie – bass (track 1), guitar (track 15)
- Nick Sanderson – drums (tracks 1, 8)

=== Additional personnel ===
- Brad Davidson – bass (track 15)
- Wiff – drums (track 15)
- Dick Meaney – engineer (tracks 1, 3, 5, 6, 8 to 10, 15)
- Anjali Dutt – engineer (track 2)
- George Kaleve – engineer (track 4)
- Alan Moulder – engineer (track 7)
- Flood – engineer (track 17)
- John Loder – production (track 20)
- Colin Bell – photography
