= Sunset 666 =

Live album by the Jesus and Mary Chain
- Released: 4 August 2023
- Recorded: 11 and 15 December 2018
- Venue: Hollywood Palladium, Los Angeles, California, United States
- Genre: Alternative rock
- Length: 68:19
- Label: Fuzz Club

The Jesus and Mary Chain chronology
Damage and Joy (2017)	Sunset 666 (2023)	Glasgow Eyes (2024)

Sunset 666 is a live album by Scottish alternative rock band the Jesus and Mary Chain, released on 4 August 2023 by Fuzz Club Records. It contains recordings from two concerts on 11 and 15 December 2018 in Hollywood, California, at the Hollywood Palladium.

== Background ==
Sunset 666 was recorded whilst the Jesus and Mary Chain were touring North America in support of Nine Inch Nails between 13 September and 15 December 2018. Tracks 1 to 12 are taken from the 15 December show, and comprises the full set that night, while tracks 13 to 17 are from the 11 December show.

No plans had been made to record any shows but as the band's sound engineer discovered a USB-out socket on the rented mixing desk, he plugged in a laptop and recorded the shows. No microphones had been placed to capture audience noise, making the crowd seem distant in the mix. According to the album liner notes, the album contains "a couple of wrong notes and errors in timing, but these defects were of no great concern because the overall aura was so alive and aggressive."

== Critical reception ==
Professional ratings
Review scores
Source	Rating
Buzz Magazine	4/5 stars
Louder Than War	5/5 stars
The Spill Magazine	3.5/5 stars

John Porter, writing for The Spill Magazine, wrote that Sunset 666 "is undoubtedly the clearest the band have sounded on record." He put it down to "the rawness of the recording, which certainly captures [the songs'] often-incendiary nature, melding together a whirling mass of heavy basslines, crashing drums, and ragged vocals." Porter felt that the album's lack of a live show 'feel' – due to the "stilted crowd noise" – makes it "a laborious listen after a while," but concluded that the album is "certainly not a bad record" and "an excellent document of the Jesus and Mary Chain as a live band."

Jared Dix of Echoes and Dust wrote, "The results are strong. Keeping things raw and honest, there has been only minimal editing to cut out William tuning his guitar. As the crowd weren't mic'd up their response sounds subdued or distant but despite the pauses between songs the set has a steady momentum."

Post-Trash's Christopher J. Lee noted that the tracks from 1989's Automatic, which faced criticism due to its increased use of drum machines, "eliminates this factor, with the songs looser and more deeply felt as a result." Lee called "Blues from a Gun" a highlight from Sunset 666, as did Louder Than War's Nathan Whittle, writing that the band "hit probably the high of the album with a blistering version of "Blues from a Gun".

== Track listing ==
All tracks are written by William Reid and Jim Reid, except where noted.

No.	Title	Writer(s)	Length
1.	"Just Like Honey"		3:38
2.	"Sometimes Always"	W. Reid	2:54
3.	"Black and Blues"		3:31
4.	"Amputation"		3:14
5.	"All Things Pass"		4:37
6.	"Some Candy Talking"		3:25
7.	"Head On"		4:40
8.	"The Living End"		2:45
9.	"Cracking Up"	W. Reid	4:35
10.	"Teenage Lust"		3:13
11.	"I Hate Rock 'n' Roll"	W. Reid	4:22
12.	"Reverence"		9:13
13.	"Blues from a Gun"		4:33
14.	"Far Gone and Out"		3:13
15.	"Between Planets"		3:36
16.	"Halfway to Crazy"		3:32
17.	"In a Hole"		3:20

== Personnel ==
Adapted from the album's liner notes.

The Jesus and Mary Chain

- Jim Reid – vocals
- William Reid – guitar
- Scott Von Ryper – guitar, backing vocals
- Mark Crozer – bass, backing vocals
- Brian Young – drums, programming

Additional personnel

- Bernadette Denning – vocals (track 1)
- Isobel Campbell – vocals (tracks 2, 3)

Technical

- Michael Brennan – engineering, mixing
- Jim Reid – engineering and mixing assistance
- William Reid – engineering and mixing assistance, artwork
- Olya Dyer – design, layout

== Charts ==
Chart performance for Sunset 666
Chart (2023)	Peak position
Scottish Albums (OCC)	12
UK Album Sales (OCC)	25
UK Independent Albums (OCC)	7
UK Physical Albums (OCC)	24
UK Record Store Albums (OCC)	23
UK Vinyl Albums (OCC)	15
