= The Power of Negative Thinking: B-Sides & Rarities =

Box set by The Jesus and Mary Chain
- Released: September 2008
- Genres: Alternative rock, noise pop, post-punk
- Labels: Blanco Y Negro; Rhino
- Producers: Mason Williams, Phil Ward-Large, John Loder, The Jesus and Mary Chain, Bill Inglot, Stephen Hague, Joe Foster

The Jesus and Mary Chain chronology
Live in Concert (2003)	The Power of Negative Thinking: B-Sides & Rarities (2008)	Upside Down: The Best of The Jesus and Mary Chain (2010)

Professional ratings
Review scores
Source	Rating
Allmusic	4.5/5 stars
ChartAttack	4/5 stars
The Guardian	4/5 stars
Mojo	4/5 stars
Paste	8.7/10
Pitchfork Media	7.5/10
PopMatters	7/10 stars
Rolling Stone	3/5 stars
Uncut	4/5 stars
The Village Voice	favorable

The Power of Negative Thinking: B-Sides & Rarities is a box set compilation album by Scottish alternative rock band The Jesus and Mary Chain, released on November 19, 2007.

It consists of material from the Barbed Wire Kisses, The Sound of Speed and The Jesus And Mary Chain Hate Rock 'n' Roll compilations, alongside unreleased tracks and rarities from throughout their career; including early performances, unheard demos, re-mixes, alternate versions of some songs and bootleg recordings.

== Reception ==
Matt Collar of Allmusic felt that the collection represented the band in a "more honest portrait"... "than even the studio albums reveal. Often mischaracterized as gloomy, goth rock misanthropes -- only partly true -- JAMC were in truth huge fans of '60s sunshine pop, surf rock, and even hip-hop and aspired to a kind of D.I.Y. Phil Spector Wall of Sound aesthetic that found them substituting Spector's strings and horns with walls of feedbacking guitar." and concluded "Ultimately, The Power of Negative Thinking isn't the whole JAMC story, but it's the whole story behind the scenes and A-side singles, and sometimes the B-sides. Even better."

Aaron Brophy of Chart Attack observed, "When you look at it carefully, what the Chain attempted to do was nothing short of redefining the parameters and reigniting the spirit of rock 'n' roll. That's a lot to put on the shoulders of a couple angry brothers from Glasgow who dressed in too much black, but few others since them have done as much to advance the sound of old school rock 'n' roll."

== Track listing ==
All tracks are written by Jim Reid and William Reid; except where indicated.

Disc one
No.	Title	Music	Length
1.	"Up Too High" (demo '83)	William Reid	3:44
2.	"Upside Down"		3:00
3.	"Vegetable Man"	Syd Barrett	3:35
4.	"Suck"		2:08
5.	"Ambition"	Vic Goddard	3:29
6.	"Just Out of Reach"		2:08
7.	"Boyfriend's Dead"		1:43
8.	"Head"		3:50
9.	"Just Like Honey" (demo Oct. '84)		2:59
10.	"Cracked"		3:47
11.	"Taste of Cindy" (acoustic version)		2:00
12.	"The Hardest Walk"		3:13
13.	"Never Understand" (alternate take)		3:26
14.	"My Little Underground" (demo)		2:33
15.	"The Living End" (demo)		2:17
16.	"Some Candy Talking"		3:18
17.	"Psychocandy"		2:54
18.	"Hit"		3:28
19.	"Cut Dead" (acoustic)		2:47
20.	"You Trip Me Up" (acoustic)		2:42
21.	"Walk and Crawl"		2:24

Disc two
No.	Title	Music	Length
1.	"Kill Surf City"		3:11
2.	"Bo Diddley Is Jesus"		3:18
3.	"Who Do You Love"	Ellas McDaniel	4:05
4.	"Everything's Alright When You're Down"		2:39
5.	"Shake"		2:01
6.	"Happy When It Rains" (demo)		3:47
7.	"Happy Place"		2:24
8.	"F. Hole"		1:09
9.	"Rider"		2:12
10.	"On the Wall" (Porta Studio demo)		3:42
11.	"Surfin' U.S.A." (April outtake)	Chuck Berry, Brian Wilson	2:58
12.	"Here It Comes Again"		2:33
13.	"Don't Ever Change"		3:33
14.	"Swing"		2:26
15.	"Sidewalking"		3:35
16.	"Surfin' U.S.A." (Summer mix)	Berry, Wilson	2:58
17.	"Shimmer"		2:47
18.	"Penetration"		2:48
19.	"Break Me Down"		2:31
20.	"Subway"		2:06
21.	"My Girl"	Smokey Robinson, Ronald White	3:05

Disc three
No.	Title	Music	Length
1.	"In the Black"		2:55
2.	"Terminal Beach"		2:25
3.	"Deviant Slice"		3:03
4.	"I'm Glad I Never"	Lee Hazlewood	1:31
5.	"Drop" (acoustic remix)		1:54
6.	"Rollercoaster"		3:52
7.	"Silverblade"		2:58
8.	"Lowlife"		3:28
9.	"Tower of Song"	Leonard Cohen	4:50
10.	"Heat"		3:01
11.	"Guitarman"	Jerry Reed	3:43
12.	"Why'd You Want Me"		3:14
13.	"Sometimes"		2:52
14.	"Teenage Lust" (acoustic version)		2:25
15.	"Reverberation (Doubt)"	Roky Erickson, Tommy Hall, Stacy Sutherland	3:47
16.	"Don't Come Down"		2:41
17.	"Snakedriver"		3:41
18.	"Something I Can't Have"		3:03
19.	"Write Record Release Blues"		2:57
20.	"Little Red Rooster"	Chester Arthur Burnett, Willie Dixon	3:27

Disc four
No.	Title	Music	Length
1.	"The Perfect Crime"	J. Reid	1:35
2.	"Little Stars"	W. Reid	3:33
3.	"Drop" (Re-recorded)	W. Reid	1:53
4.	"I'm In With the Out Crowd"	J. Reid	2:37
5.	"New York City"	W. Reid	1:59
6.	"Taking It Away"	Ben Lurie	2:12
7.	"Ghost of a Smile"	Shane MacGowan	2:55
8.	"Alphabet Street"	Prince	2:17
9.	"Coast to Coast" (alternate - William Vox)		2:17
10.	"Dirty Water" (demo - William Vox)	W. Reid	3:15
11.	"Till I Found You"		2:05
12.	"Bleed Me"	J. Reid	3:38
13.	"33⅓"	J. Reid	3:19
14.	"Lost Star"	W. Reid	2:05
15.	"Hide Myself"	J. Reid	3:31
16.	"Rocket"	Lurie	3:02
17.	"Easylife, Easylove"	J. Reid	4:08
18.	"40.000k"	J. Reid	2:51
19.	"Nineteen666"	Dick Meaney, W. Reid	3:31
20.	"Some Candy Talking" (acoustic version; iTunes US bonus track)		3:12

== Personnel ==
Musician credits

- Barry Blacker – Drums
- Murray Dalglish – Drums
- Brad Davidson – Bass
- Geoff Donkin – Drums
- Terry Edwards – Trumpet
- Dave Evans – Rhythm guitar
- Lincoln Fong – Bass
- Bobby Gillespie – Drums
- Dick Green – Bass
- Douglas Hart – Bass
- Martin Hewes – Drums
- Philip King – Bass
- Ben Lurie – Bass, Rhythm guitar, background vocals
- Shane MacGowan – Vocals
- Steve Monti – Drums
- John J. Moore – Drums, Rhythm guitar
- Karen Parker – background vocals
- Matthew Parkin – Bass
- James Pinker – Drums
- Jim Reid – Guitar, Vocals, Instrumentation
- Linda Reid – Vocals
- William Reid – Guitar, Vocals, Instrumentation
- Nick Sanderson – Drums
- Hope Sandoval – Vocals
- Richard Thomas – Drums

Recording credits

- Joe Foster – Producer
- Stephen Hague – Producer
- Ivan Ivan – Remixing
- The Jesus and Mary Chain – Producer
- John Loder – Producer, Engineer
- Steve Peck – Engineer
- Jim Reid – Producer
- William Reid – Producer
- Phil Ward-Large – Producer

Production credits

- Vanessa Atkins – Editorial Supervision
- Glenn A. Baker – Photography
- Paul Barber – Project Assistant
- P.G. Brunelli – Photography
- Andrew Catlin – Photography
- Donna DeChristopher – Project Assistant
- Steve Double – Photography
- Casey Estevez – Package Supervision
- Dele Fadele – Liner Notes
- Sheryl Farber – Project Assistant
- Lyn Fey – Project Assistant
- Steven P. Gorman – Photo Research
- Dan Hersch – Remastering
- Robin Hurley – Project Assistant
- Wendy Idele – Photography
- Bill Inglot – Compilation Producer, Remastering
- Gie Knaeps – Photography
- Masaki Koike – Art Direction, Design
- Ross Marino – Photography, Cover Photo
- Patrick Milligan – Discographical Annotation
- Kenny Nemes – Product Manager
- Joshua Petker – Art Supervisor
- David Ponak – Project Assistant
- Alessandra Quaranta – Photo Research
- Julie Reid – Project Assistant
- Paul Rider – Photography
- Ebet Roberts – Photography
- Tom Sheehan – Photography
- Nina Talikka – Research Assistant
- Scott Webber – Project Assistant
- Kevin Westenberg – Photography
- Mason Williams – Compilation Producer
- Steve Woolard – Project Assistant
