= Live in Concert (The Jesus and Mary Chain album) =

Live album by The Jesus and Mary Chain
- Released: May 2003
- Recorded: 1992, 1995
- Genre: Alternative rock
- Label: Strange Fruit

The Jesus and Mary Chain chronology
21 Singles (2002)	Live in Concert (2003)	The Power of Negative Thinking: B-Sides & Rarities (2008)

Professional ratings
Review scores
Source	Rating
Uncut	4/5 stars

Live in Concert is a live album by the noise pop band The Jesus and Mary Chain, released in 2003. It contains recordings from two concerts from 1992 and 1995.

== Track listing ==
All songs written by Jim Reid and William Reid, except where noted.

CD (SFRSCD117)

1. "Catch Fire" - 4:36
2. "Blues from a Gun" - 4:20
3. "Head On" - 4:02
4. "Reverence" - 4:55
5. "Far Gone and Out" - 2:48
6. "Half Way to Crazy" - 3:09
7. "Sidewalking" - 8:02
8. "Reverence" - 5:19
9. "Snakedriver" - 3:49
10. "Come On" (J. Reid) - 2:48
11. "Happy When It Rains" - 3:22
12. "Teenage Lust" - 3:39
13. "The Perfect Crime" (J. Reid) - 1:38
14. "Everybody I Know" (W. Reid) - 2:10
15. "Girlfriend" (W. Reid) - 3:13
16. "Hole" (J. Reid) - 2:05
17. "Head On" - 4:14
18. "Sugar Ray" - 4:38
19. "I Hate Rock 'n' Roll" (W. Reid) - 3:43

=== Notes ===
- Tracks 1–7: Recorded 28 March 1992 at Sheffield Arena
- Tracks 8–19: Recorded 19 April 1995 at Trinity College, Bristol
