= Hate Rock 'n' Roll =

Compilation album by the Jesus and Mary Chain
- Released: September 1995
- Genre: Alternative rock, noise pop
- Label: American Recordings
- Producer: Jim Reid, William Reid

The Jesus and Mary Chain chronology
Stoned & Dethroned (1994)	Hate Rock 'n' Roll (1995)	Munki (1998)

Professional ratings
Review scores
Source	Rating
AllMusic	2/5 stars
The Rolling Stone Album Guide	2.5/5 stars

Hate Rock 'n' Roll is the third compilation of B-sides and rare tracks by Scottish alternative rock band the Jesus and Mary Chain.

== Track listing ==
All songs written by Jim Reid and William Reid, except where noted.

CD (9–43043–2)
No.	Title	Writer(s)	Original release	Length
1.	"I Hate Rock 'n' Roll"	W. Reid	Single "I Hate Rock 'n' Roll" (1995)	3:43
2.	"Snakedriver"		EP Sound of Speed (1993)	3:42
3.	"Something I Can't Have"		EP Sound of Speed (1993)	3:01
4.	"Bleed Me"	J. Reid	Single "I Hate Rock 'n' Roll" (1995)	3:37
5.	"33 1/3"	J. Reid	Single "I Hate Rock 'n' Roll" (1995)	3:17
6.	"Lost Star"	W. Reid	Single "I Hate Rock 'n' Roll" (1995)	2:05
7.	"Penetration"		B-side to "Blues from a Gun" (1989)	2:47
8.	"New York City"	W. Reid	B-side to "Come On" (1994)	1:58
9.	"Taking It Away"	Ben Lurie	B-side to "Come On" (1994)	2:11
10.	"I'm in With the Out Crowd"	J. Reid
11.	"Little Stars"	W. Reid	B-side to "Sometimes Always" (1994)	2:36
12.	"Teenage Lust" (Desdemoana mix)		Remix of track from Honey's Dead (1992)	3:32
13.	"Perfect Crime"	W. Reid	B-side to "Sometimes Always" (1994)	1:34

== Personnel ==
=== The Jesus and Mary Chain ===
- Jim Reid – vocals, guitar, production
- William Reid – vocals, guitar, production, engineer (track 7)
- Ben Lurie – bass
- Nick Sanderson – drums (tracks 1 to 6)
- Steve Monti – drums (tracks 9 to 11)

=== Additional personnel ===
- Dick Meaney – engineer (tracks 1 to 6, 11)
- Nick Addison – engineer (tracks 8 to 10)
- Martin Schmeize – engineer (track 12)
