= The Complete John Peel Sessions (The Jesus and Mary Chain album) =

Compilation album by The Jesus and Mary Chain
- Released: February 2000
- Recorded: October 1984 – November 1989
- Genre: Alternative rock, noise pop
- Length: 60:37
- Label: Strange Fruit
- Producer: Mark Radcliffe, Dale Griffin, Mike Robinson

The Jesus and Mary Chain chronology
Munki (1998)	The Complete John Peel Sessions (2000)	21 Singles (2002)

Professional ratings
Review scores
Source	Rating
AllMusic	4/5 stars
The Rolling Stone Album Guide	3.5/5 stars

The Complete John Peel Sessions is an album released by Scottish alternative band The Jesus and Mary Chain.

It comprises the sessions the group recorded for the late Radio 1 DJ John Peel on his late night radio show from 23 October 1984 to 26 November 1989. Peel was an early supporter of the band and gave them well needed publicity which they were unable to gain from the majority of other DJs and music programs of the day who concentrated mostly on the Synthpop craze sweeping the 1980s.

In 1985 (the year of the band's debut release Psychocandy), John Peel show listeners voted them 1st (Never Understand), 2nd (Just Like Honey) and 12th (You Trip Me Up) in his annual Festive Fifty chart.

== Track listing ==
All songs written by Jim Reid and William Reid, except where noted.

LP (SFRSLP 092) and CD (SFRSCD 092)

1. "In a Hole" – 2:42
2. "You Trip Me Up" – 2:07
3. "Never Understand" – 3:08
4. "Taste the Floor" – 3:07
5. "The Living End" – 2:14
6. "Inside Me" – 3:00
7. "Just Like Honey" – 2:48
8. "Some Candy Talking" – 3:12
9. "Psycho Candy" – 2:00
10. "You Trip Me Up" – 2:41
11. "Cut Dead" – 2:46
12. "Fall" – 3:11
13. "In the Rain" – 2:27
14. "Happy Place" – 2:21
15. "Sidewalking" – 4:22
16. "Coast to Coast" – 3:19
17. "Take It" – 3:06
18. "My Girl" (Smokey Robinson, Ronald White) – 3:05
19. "Far Gone and Out" – 3:03
20. "Silverblade" – 3:11
21. "Here Comes Alice" – 2:47

Recording dates

- Tracks 1 to 4 recorded 23 October 1984
- Tracks 5 to 7 recorded 3 February 1985
- Tracks 8 to 11 recorded 29 October 1985
- Tracks 12 to 14 recorded 25 November 1986
- Tracks 15 to 18 recorded 31 May 1988
- Tracks 19 to 21 recorded 26 November 1989

== Personnel ==
=== The Jesus and Mary Chain ===
- Jim Reid – vocals
- William Reid – guitar
- Douglas Hart – bass (tracks 1 to 7, 15 to 21)
- Bobby Gillespie – drums (tracks 1 to 7)

=== Additional personnel ===
- Karen Parker – backing vocals (tracks 5 to 7)
- Mark Radcliffe – production (tracks 1 to 4)
- Dale Griffin – production (tracks 5 to 14, 19 to 21)
- Mike Robinson – production (tracks 15 to 18)
- Mike Engles – engineer (tracks 5 to 7, 19 to 21)
- Dave Dade – engineer (tracks: 12 to 14)
- Mike Robinson – engineer (tracks 1 to 4, 15 to 18)
- Simon Clifford – engineer (tracks 12 to 14)
