= The Peel Sessions (The Jesus and Mary Chain EP) =

EP by The Jesus and Mary Chain
- Released: September 1991
- Genre: Alternative rock
- Label: Strange Fruit
- Producer: Dale Griffin, Dave Dade

The Jesus and Mary Chain EP chronology
Rollercoaster (1990)	The Peel Sessions (1991)	Sound of Speed (1993)

The Peel Sessions is an extended play (EP) by the Scottish rock band The Jesus & Mary Chain, released in September 1991 by Strange Fruit. It contains recordings the band made for John Peel's Radio 1 show. It was re-released in 2000 as part of a compilation containing all of the band's Peel sessions.

== Critical reception ==
Trouser Press remarked that the EP is "notable for its first half: a February 1985 document of Psychocandy songs played by the short-lived quartet (with future Primal Scream leader Bobby Gillespie on drums) that originally recorded them." AllMusic called it "their most revealing Peel session ... It proved that their songs had an underlying beauty not always apparent below the usual layers of screeching feedback."

== Track listing ==
All tracks written by Jim Reid and William Reid.

12" (SFPMA 21) and CD (SFPMACD 210)

1. "Inside Me" - 3:00
2. "The Living End" - 2:15
3. "Just Like Honey" - 2:48
4. "Fall" - 3:14
5. "Happy Place" - 2:20
6. "In the Rain (About You)" - 2:30

Notes

- Tracks 1 to 3 recorded 3 February 1985
- Tracks 4 to 5 recorded 25 November 1986

== Personnel ==
=== The Jesus and Mary Chain ===
- Jim Reid – vocals, guitar
- William Reid – vocals, guitar

=== Additional personnel ===
- Dale Griffin – producer (tracks 1 to 3)
- Mike Engles – engineer (tracks 1 to 3)
- Dave Dade – producer (tracks 4 to 6)
- Simon Clifford – engineer (tracks 4 to 6)
- Don Walker – mastering
