= Sister Vanilla =

- Born: Linda Reid; 1971 (age 54–55); East Kilbride, Scotland
- Genres: Shoegaze, Indie rock, Alternative rock
- Occupation: Singer-songwriter
- Instrument: Vocals
- Years active: 1983–present
- Labels: P-Vine; Chemikal Underground
- Website: www.sistervanilla.com

Linda Reid (born 1971), better known by her stage name Sister Vanilla, is a Scottish singer-songwriter. She is the younger sister of The Jesus and Mary Chain core members, Jim and William Reid.

== Biography ==
Linda was born in 1971 in East Kilbride, Scotland. Despite being only a schoolgirl during the early breakthrough of her brothers' band The Jesus and Mary Chain in mid-1980s, she eventually became a vocalist, contributing to the track "Moe Tucker" on the band's album Munki in 1998. She also accompanied the band while touring for the record. Following the band's demise less than a year later, Jim and William proposed recording an album with her. The sessions took place over the next several years, with the album being partly home recorded at Linda's flat and partly recorded at Reid brothers' studio, The Drugstore. The Reid siblings were joined by Stephen Pastel of the Pastels and former The Jesus and Mary Chain guitarist Ben Lurie.

Linda debuted her album, Little Pop Rock in 2005 through Japanese P-Vine record label. It was released under the alias "Sister Vanilla", which was a nickname given to her by her brothers during their childhood. Embraced by critics and fans as "a pop-wise, slightly sunnier variation on the band's signature sound", the record was reissued by Scottish Chemikal Underground label in 2007.

== Discography ==
Studio albums

- Little Pop Rock (2005)

Singles

- "Song for a Secret" / "Can't Stop the Rock" (with Jim Reid, 2005)
- "Can't Stop the Rock" (2007)

Guest appearances

- The Jesus and Mary Chain — Munki (1998)
- Lazycame — Finbegin (2001)
- The Jesus and Mary Chain — Damage and Joy (2017)
