= Glasgow Eyes =

Studio album by the Jesus and Mary Chain
- Released: 22 March 2024
- Studio: Castle of Doom (Glasgow); Rapunzel (Seaton); Sound Gallery (Exeter); Casa Roja (Arizona)
- Length: 48:55
- Label: Fuzz Club
- Producer: The Jesus and Mary Chain

The Jesus and Mary Chain chronology
Sunset 666 (2023)	Glasgow Eyes (2024)

Singles from Glasgow Eyes
- 1. "Jamcod" Released: 29 November 2023; 2. "Chemical Animal" Released: 18 January 2024; 3. "Girl 71" Released: 26 February 2024

Glasgow Eyes is the eighth studio album by Scottish alternative rock band the Jesus and Mary Chain, released on 22 March 2024 through Fuzz Club,. It marks their first studio release in seven years, following Damage and Joy (2017).

The album received positive reviews from critics and debuted at No. 7 on the UK Albums Chart, the band's first top 10 placement since the Barbed Wire Kisses compilation in 1988.

== Background and promotion ==
The band recorded Glasgow Eyes mostly at the Castle of Doom Studios in Glasgow but with most of Jim's parts being recorded at Rapunzel Studios in Devon. Jim Reid stated that the album is "certainly" what people expect of a Jesus and Mary Chain record. Coinciding with their 40th band anniversary, he said that their "creative approach" is the same as it was in 1984: "just hit the studio and see what happens". They started recording a "bunch of songs" and "let it take its course". Reid clarified that there were "no rules" as they share a form of "telepathy", calling him and his brother "those weird not-quite twins that finish each other's sentences". The duo went into the studio and felt their "way around" operating by "the same old deal", however, contemporary music had "some sort of impact on the production values". They messed around with "some synths" and tweaked "the sound a bit". In an interview with Kyle Meredith, William Reid revealed that the band had to record the entire album a 2nd time after their engineer lost all of the original recordings, forcing to the band to start from scratch.

The lead single "Jamcod" was released alongside the album announcement on 29 November 2023. Leaning on "their barbed electronic aspects", it showcases William Reid's "synth skills" and combines "dark electronica with some crunching guitars". The duo will embark on a European tour in March and April 2024.

On 22 February 2024, it was announced that the album would be delayed by two weeks, and was now set to release on 22 March.

== Critical reception ==
Professional ratings
Aggregate scores
Source	Rating
Metacritic	77/100
Review scores
Source	Rating
AllMusic	3.5/5 stars
Classic Rock	4/5 stars
The Guardian	3/5 stars
Mojo	4/5 stars
Pitchfork	6.5/10
Record Collector	5/5 stars
Uncut	8/10

Glasgow Eyes received a score of 77 out of 100 on review aggregator Metacritic based on 15 critics' reviews, indicating "generally favorable reviews". Mojo felt that "Glasgow Eyes' liberal use of electronics is a renewing force, and a kind of homecoming too", calling the album "a positive twist in the saga of these negaholics synonymous". Uncut stated that "William and Jim Reid remain as defiantly out of time as ever", while Classic Rock observed that "the record ends with a burst of Velvets fuzz-rock titled Hey Lou Reid – but it's only fitting on a record that burnishes their legend with such sizzling acid". Record Collector's Jeremy Allen wrote that Glasgow Eyes "puts a stop to any perceived rot. It's a staggering, swaggering achievement more vital than anything they've done in the last 35 years".

=== Year-end lists ===
Select year-end rankings for Glasgow Eyes
Publication/critic	Accolade	Rank	Ref.
MOJO	The Best Albums Of 2024	47	
Rough Trade UK	Albums of the Year 2024	65	
Uncut	80 Best Albums of 2024	63	

== Track listing ==
All tracks are written by William Reid and Jim Reid.

Glasgow Eyes track listing
No.	Title	Length
1.	"Venal Joy"	3:27
2.	"American Born"	3:04
3.	"Mediterranean X Film"	4:24
4.	"Jamcod"	3:59
5.	"Discotheque"	4:13
6.	"Pure Poor"	5:18
7.	"The Eagles and the Beatles"	3:10
8.	"Silver Strings"	3:28
9.	"Chemical Animal"	4:33
10.	"Second of June"	3:56
11.	"Girl 71"	3:08
12.	"Hey Lou Reid"	6:15
Total length:		48:55

== Personnel ==
=== The Jesus and Mary Chain ===
- Jim Reid – vocals (tracks 1, 4, 7, 9–11), instruments, production
- William Reid – vocals (tracks 2, 3, 5–8, 12), instruments, production, artwork

=== Additional personnel ===
- Fay Fife – vocals (track 1)
- Rachel Conti – vocals (track 11)
- James Mason – handclaps (track 7)
- Majorie Mason – handclaps (track 7)
- Tony Doogan – programming, piano, engineering, mixing
- George Arnold – additional engineering
- Duncan Chave – additional engineering
- Dollar Bill McLeish – additional engineering
- Dan Doherty – additional mixing assistance
- Pete Maher – mastering

== Charts ==
Chart performance for Glasgow Eyes
Chart (2024)	Peak position
Austrian Albums (Ö3 Austria)	12
Belgian Albums (Ultratop Flanders)	71
Belgian Albums (Ultratop Wallonia)	69
Croatian International Albums (HDU)	33
German Albums (Offizielle Top 100)	36
Irish Independent Albums (IRMA)	12
Portuguese Albums (AFP)	115
Scottish Albums (OCC)	1
Spanish Albums (PROMUSICAE)	60
Swedish Physical Albums (Sverigetopplistan)	5
Swiss Albums (Schweizer Hitparade)	33
UK Albums (OCC)	7
UK Independent Albums (OCC)	1
US Top Current Album Sales (Billboard)	47
US Indie Store Album Sales (Billboard)	9
