= Almost Gold (song) =

1992 single by the Jesus and Mary Chain

Single by the Jesus and Mary Chain

from the album Honey's Dead
- B-side: "Teenage Lust"
- Released: 22 June 1992
- Length: 3:17
- Label: Blanco y Negro, Def American
- Songwriter(s): Jim Reid, William Reid
- Producer(s): Jim Reid, William Reid

The Jesus and Mary Chain singles chronology
"Far Gone and Out" (1992)	"Almost Gold" (1992)	"Sometimes Always" (1994)

"Almost Gold" is a song by Scottish alternative rock group the Jesus and Mary Chain, released as the third single from the group's fourth studio album, Honey's Dead (1992). It was released by Blanco y Negro Records on 22 June 1992 and reached number 41 on the UK Single Chart.

== Track listings ==
All tracks were written by Jim Reid and William Reid except where noted. All live tracks were recorded by BBC at the Sheffield Arena on 14 May 1992.

7-inch single (NEG57)

1. "Almost Gold" – 3:16
2. "Teenage Lust" (acoustic version) – 2:23

10-inch single (NEG57TE)

1. "Almost Gold" – 3:16
2. "Catchfire" (live) – 4:29
3. "Blues from a Gun" (live) – 4:12
4. "Head On" (live) – 4:00

12-inch and CD single (NEG57T; NEG57CD)

1. "Almost Gold" – 3:16
2. "Teenage Lust" (acoustic version) – 2:23
3. "Reverberation (Doubt)" (Roky Erickson, Tommy Hall, Stacy Sutherland) – 3:45
4. "Don't Come Down" – 2:38

== Personnel ==
The Jesus and Mary Chain

- Jim Reid – vocals, guitar, production
- William Reid – vocals, guitar, production

Additional personnel

- Alan Moulder – engineering ("Almost Gold")
- Georg Kaleve – engineering ("Teenage Lust")
- Dick Meaney – engineering ("Don't Come Down")
- Mark Radcliffe – production (live tracks)
- Greg Jakobek – design

== Charts ==
Chart (1992)	Peak position
UK Singles (OCC)	41
US Alternative Airplay (Billboard)	13
