= Honey's Dead =

Studio album by The Jesus and Mary Chain
- Released: 22 March 1992
- Recorded: 1991
- Studio: The Drugstore
- Genre: Alternative rock, noise rock
- Length: 42:39
- Label: Blanco y Negro, Def American Recordings
- Producer: William Reid, Jim Reid

The Jesus and Mary Chain chronology
Automatic (1989)	Honey's Dead (1992)	The Sound of Speed (1993)

Singles from Honey's Dead
- 1. "Reverence" Released: February 1992; 2. "Far Gone and Out" Released: March 1992; 3. "Almost Gold" Released: June 1992

Professional ratings
Review scores
Source	Rating
AllMusic	4.5/5 stars
Los Angeles Times	3.5/4 stars
NME	9/10
Pitchfork	6.9/10
Q	4/5 stars
Rolling Stone	4/5 stars
The Rolling Stone Album Guide	3/5 stars
Select	5/5

Honey's Dead is the fourth studio album by the Scottish alternative rock band The Jesus and Mary Chain, released in 1992 on Blanco y Negro Records. It marked a return to a more abrasive sound for the group, as well as incorporating elements of alternative dance. It peaked at No.14 on the UK Charts.

The album's title refers to one of the band's early hits, "Just Like Honey", and is intended to demonstrate a complete departure from their earlier musical style. The cover art features a detail from the painting Ophelia (First Version) by the Pre-Raphaelite painter Arthur Hughes.

The album's first single, "Reverence", attracted some controversy for the lyrics "I want to die just like Jesus Christ", and "I want to die just like JFK". Banned by Top of the Pops, the track peaked at #10 in the UK charts and received airplay in the United States on alternative radio stations.

The album was on the short list of nominees for the 1992 Mercury Prize.

== Background ==
Honey's Dead was recorded in the band's London studio, the aptly named "Drugstore", with accomplished engineer Flood and future JaMC producer Alan Moulder on board (not to mention a considerably larger bankroll).

Alternative and campus radio stations picked up "Far Gone and Out" which remains one of the band's most popular singles to date, peaking at #23 in the band's native UK. The Mary Chain shared the bill during parts of Lollapalooza 1992 in the U.S. with Pearl Jam, Soundgarden, Ministry, Lush, Ice Cube and Red Hot Chili Peppers. Anheuser Busch even used the samples of "Sugar Ray" as a background bed for their Bud Ice television commercials in 1993.

== Reception ==
Ned Raggett of Allmusic praised the album, observing "on balance a more consistent and satisfying record than Automatic. There's a sense of greater creativity with the arrangements, while the balance between blasting static rampage and precise, almost clinical delivery is the finest yet, making the album as a whole the best straight-through listen since Psychocandy." Richard Cromelin of Los Angeles Times felt the album had "dry, deadpan vocals set ironically against a grand sound, the Jesus and Mary Chain comes on like a like a bratty, grunge-encrusted offspring of the Pet Shop Boys."

The album posts a close second in sales to their next release, Stoned & Dethroned (1994) (which contains the hit single "Sometimes Always" with Hope Sandoval of Mazzy Star). The Reid brothers alternate between singing duties on tracks (most likely coinciding with songwriting duties).

Jimmy Eat World frontman Jim Adkins has praised the album, stating:

"I like how JAMC were developing their songs, and what they were using, what musical devices they were using, to build dynamics. There are subtle things that really move these songs along – extra percussion loops, or some feedback-y noise appearing halfway through a song. Again, it sounded like nothing else I'd really heard up until then – familiar, but alien too. It was perplexing in a way, because I couldn’t work out how they’d done some of it."

== Track listing ==
All songs written by Jim Reid and William Reid.

LP (BYN 26) and Cassette (BYNC 26)

Side one

1. "Reverence" – 3:40
2. "Teenage Lust" – 3:06
3. "Far Gone and Out" – 2:51
4. "Almost Gold" – 3:19
5. "Sugar Ray" – 4:41
6. "Tumbledown" – 4:10

Side two

1. "Catchfire" – 4:47
2. "Good for My Soul" – 3:05
3. "Rollercoaster" – 3:46
4. "I Can't Get Enough" – 2:56
5. "Sundown" – 4:59
6. "Frequency" – 1:19

CD (BYNCD 26)

1. "Reverence" – 3:40
2. "Teenage Lust" – 3:06
3. "Far Gone and Out" – 2:51
4. "Almost Gold" – 3:19
5. "Sugar Ray" – 4:41
6. "Tumbledown" – 4:10
7. "Catchfire" – 4:47
8. "Good for My Soul" – 3:05
9. "Rollercoaster" – 3:46
10. "I Can't Get Enough" – 2:56
11. "Sundown" – 4:59
12. "Frequency" – 1:19

Notes

- Track 6: Contains a sample of Einstürzende Neubauten's "Tanz Debil" (Kollaps, 1981) starting at 1:25 and lasting for roughly 18 seconds.
- Track 9: Is listed as "copyright 1990" (while the rest of the album is "copyright 1992"), but the version here is not the original 1990 EP version. This version features live drums (presumably by Monti) and does not have the echo on William Reid's voice, and is likely a re-recorded version from the album sessions.

== Personnel ==
The Jesus and Mary Chain

- Jim Reid – vocals (tracks 1, 2, 3, 5, 6, 8), guitar, producer
- William Reid – vocals (tracks 4, 7, 9, 10, 11, 12), guitar, producer
- Steve Monti – drums, percussion

Additional personnel

- Alan Moulder – engineer (except track 9), mixing
- Flood – engineer (track 9)
- Andy Catlin – photography
