= April Skies =

1987 single by the Jesus and Mary Chain

Single by the Jesus and Mary Chain

from the album Darklands
- B-side: "Kill Surf City"
- Released: 20 April 1987
- Length: 4:00 (album version); 3:14 (7-inch single)
- Label: Blanco y Negro
- Songwriters: William Reid; Jim Reid
- Producers: William Reid; Bill Price

The Jesus and Mary Chain singles chronology
"Just Like Honey" (1985)	"April Skies" (1987)	"Happy When It Rains" (1987)

"April Skies" is a song by Scottish alternative rock group the Jesus and Mary Chain and the first single from the group's second studio album, Darklands (1987). The song was released by Blanco y Negro Records in April 1987, reaching No. 8 on the UK Singles Chart, No. 6 in Ireland, and No. 16 in New Zealand, making it the band's highest-charting single in all three countries.

== Track listings ==
All tracks were written by Jim Reid and William Reid except where noted.

7-inch single

A. "April Skies"
B. "Kill Surf City"

Limited-edition 2×7-inch single

A. "April Skies"
B. "Kill Surf City"
C. "Mushroom" (live in Nuremberg 1986) (Can)
D. "Bo Diddley Is Jesus"

12-inch single

A1. "April Skies" (long version)
B1. "Kill Surf City"
B2. "Who Do You Love?" (Bo Diddley)

== Personnel ==
The Jesus and Mary Chain

- Jim Reid – vocals, guitar
- William Reid – guitar, producer

Additional personnel

- Bill Price – production (track 1)
- John Loder – production (tracks 2 to 4)
- Linda Reid – design
- Helen Backhouse – design

== Charts ==
Chart (1987)	Peak position
Europe (European Hot 100 Singles)	44
Ireland (IRMA)	6
New Zealand (Recorded Music NZ)	16
UK Singles (OCC)	8
