= Damage and Joy =

Studio album by the Jesus and Mary Chain
- Released: 24 March 2017
- Recorded: Spain; England; United States; Ireland
- Length: 53:05
- Label: Artificial Plastic
- Producers: Youth; the Jesus and Mary Chain

The Jesus and Mary Chain chronology
Psychocandy Live: Barrowlands (2015)	Damage and Joy (2017)	Sunset 666 (2023)

Singles from Damage and Joy
- 1. "Amputation" Released: 9 December 2016; 2. "Always Sad" Released: 10 February 2017; 3. "The Two of Us" Released: 16 September 2017

Damage and Joy is the seventh studio album by Scottish alternative rock band the Jesus and Mary Chain, released on 24 March 2017 by Artificial Plastic Records. It is the group's first album in 19 years, and marks their first collaboration with producer Youth. The album was recorded following the band's reunion and features contributions from several guest musicians.

Half of the album's songs had appeared previously in different versions: an earlier recording of "All Things Pass" was released on the 2008 Heroes soundtrack as "All Things Must Pass"; "Song for a Secret" and "Amputation" were released by Jim Reid, the latter as a solo single in 2007 under the title "Dead End Kids"; "Can't Stop the Rock" was released by Sister Vanilla, the Reids' sister Linda; and "The Two of Us", "Get on Home", and "Facing Up to the Facts" were released by Jim's band Freeheat.

== Reception ==
Professional ratings
Aggregate scores
Source	Rating
Metacritic	70/100
Review scores
Source	Rating
AllMusic	3/5 stars
Consequence of Sound	C+
DIY	4/5 stars
The Observer	3/5 stars
Paste	6.2/10
Pitchfork	6.7/10
PopMatters	6/10 stars
Record Collector	4/5 stars
Rolling Stone	3.5/5 stars
The Skinny	3/5 stars

Accolades for Damage and Joy
Publication	Accolade	Year	Rank	Ref.
Fopp	Best Albums of the Year	2017	45	
God Is in the TV	Top 50 Albums of the Year	2017	35	
Louder Than War	Top 100 Albums of the Year	2017	4	
Piccadilly Records	Top 100 Albums of the Year	2017	53	

== Track listing ==
All tracks are written by William Reid and Jim Reid.

Damage and Joy track listing
No.	Title	Length
1.	"Amputation"	3:24
2.	"War on Peace"	4:34
3.	"All Things Pass"	4:34
4.	"Always Sad"	2:52
5.	"Song for a Secret"	3:21
6.	"The Two of Us"	4:12
7.	"Los Feliz (Blues and Greens)"	4:54
8.	"Mood Rider"	4:04
9.	"Presidici (Et Chapaquiditch)"	3:36
10.	"Get on Home"	3:31
11.	"Facing Up to the Facts"	3:05
12.	"Simian Split"	4:14
13.	"Black and Blues"	3:23
14.	"Can't Stop the Rock"	3:21
Total length:		53:05

Japanese edition bonus tracks
No.	Title	Length
15.	"Black and Blues" (acoustic demo)	2:36
16.	"Yoko"	3:53
Total length:		59:34

== Personnel ==
=== The Jesus and Mary Chain ===
- Jim Reid
- William Reid

=== Additional musicians ===
- Bernadette Denning – vocals (track 4)
- Isobel Campbell – vocals (tracks 5, 6)
- Linda Fox – vocals (tracks 7, 14)
- Sky Ferreira – vocals (track 13)
- Brian Young – drums
- Phil King – guitar (track 13)
- Chris Phillips – drums (track 8)

=== Technical ===
- Youth – production (tracks 1–7, 9–11, 13, 14)
- Michael Rendall – engineering, mixing
- Jamie McEvoy – mixing assistance
- The Jesus and Mary Chain – production (tracks 8, 12)
- Dave Trumfio – pre-production (track 8)
- Josiah Mazzaschi – engineering (tracks 8, 12)
- Jamie Grashion – additional engineering
- Conor Brady – additional engineering
- Tommaso Colliva – additional mix engineering
- Marcus Locock – additional mix engineering
- John Davis – mastering at Metropolis Mastering (London)
- Rachel Willett – cover photo

== Charts ==
Chart performance for Damage and Joy
Chart (2017)	Peak position
Australian Albums (ARIA)	72
Austrian Albums (Ö3 Austria)	32
Belgian Albums (Ultratop Flanders)	60
Belgian Albums (Ultratop Wallonia)	44
French Albums (SNEP)	77
German Albums (Offizielle Top 100)	34
Irish Albums (IRMA)	22
Italian Albums (FIMI)	70
New Zealand Heatseekers Albums (RMNZ)	1
Portuguese Albums (AFP)	24
Scottish Albums (Official Charts)	6
Spanish Albums (Promusicae)	31
Swiss Albums (Schweizer Hitparade)	43
UK Albums (Official Charts)	16
UK Independent Albums (Official Charts)	1
US Independent Albums (Billboard)	9
US Top Alternative Albums (Billboard)	22
US Top Rock Albums (Billboard)	38
