= Upside Down (The Jesus and Mary Chain song) =

Single by The Jesus and Mary Chain
- B-side: "Vegetable Man"
- Released: November 1984
- Recorded: September 1984, Alaska Studios
- Genre: Noise pop
- Length: 3:00
- Label: Creation
- Songwriters: William Reid, Jim Reid
- Producers: The Jesus and Mary Chain, Joe Foster

The Jesus and Mary Chain singles chronology
"Upside Down" (1984)	"Never Understand" (1985)

Alternative Cover
- Cover of re-release

"Upside Down" is the debut single from the Scottish alternative rock band the Jesus and Mary Chain. The song was written by William Reid and Jim Reid, and was produced by The Jesus and Mary Chain. The B-side is a cover of the Syd Barrett song "Vegetable Man" and was produced by Joe Foster.

It is the band's only early period release for the Creation Records label. And with about 50,000 copies sold it was the first success for the label.

The sleeves for the first 1,000 copies (in black with red words and an address to write to the band under the credits) were printed by Bobby Gillespie (the next drummer in the band) in Glasgow, and featured handwritten messages from the group. Subsequent copies (without the band address) were produced in several colour variations including red, yellow, blue and pink. In 1985, the single was re-released with a different sleeve with the same catalogue number.

== Reception ==
Spin wrote, "It's a sheer blast of power that threatens to overtake the big-beat drum and wrest control of the song. It buries Jim Reid's gentle and harmonic vocals, as if he'd sung them for a braking train. Like a synthesizer in hell, or a siren at full wail, the sound of feedback is an instrument in itself."

== Track listing ==
7" (CRE 012)

1. "Upside Down" (Jim Reid, William Reid) – 3:00
2. "Vegetable Man" (Syd Barrett) – 3:35

== Personnel ==
=== The Jesus and Mary Chain ===
- Jim Reid – vocals, producer
- William Reid – guitar, producer
- Douglas Hart – bass
- Murray Dalglish – drums

=== Additional personnel ===
- Alan McGee - producer (track 1)
- Joe Foster - producer (track 2)
