= Freeheat =

British indie rock band

- Origin: United Kingdom
- Genres: Indie rock, indie pop
- Years active: 1999–present
- Labels: Planting Seeds Records; Outafocus Recordings; Hall of Records
- Members: Jim Reid; Ben Lurie; Nick Sanderson (deceased); Romi Mori

Freeheat are a British indie rock band formed by Jim Reid and Ben Lurie of The Jesus and Mary Chain and Romi Mori and Nick Sanderson of The Gun Club.

After releasing an EP, Don't Worry Be Happy (later released with a bonus track as Retox), their debut album, Back on the Water was released, after several delays, on 13 June 2006, on Planting Seeds Records, a label mostly known for indie pop recordings.

Jim Reid has also continued recording and touring under his own name, both solo, and with his sister's act, Sister Vanilla.

The band's 2006 album, Back on the Water, received a rating score of six from PopMatters.

== Discography ==
=== EPs and albums ===
Don't Worry Be Happy EP (2000)

1. The Two of Us
2. Facing Up to the Facts
3. Shine on Little Star
4. Nobody's Gonna Trip My Wire

Retox EP (2002)

1. The Two of Us
2. Facing Up to the Facts
3. Shine on Little Star
4. The Long Goodbye
5. Nobody's Gonna Trip My Wire

Back on the Water (2006) (official site)

1. Keep on Truckin'
2. What Goes Around (live)
3. Back on the Water (live)
4. The Story So Far
5. Everything
6. Dead End Kids (live)
7. Get on Home
8. Facing Up to the Facts (live)
9. Shine on Little Star
10. Get on Home (live)
11. Down
12. The Two of Us (live)
13. The Real Deal
14. Shine on Little Star (live)
15. Don't Look Back
16. K Moon (live)
17. Baby G2 (live)

=== Compilations ===
Sunsets and Silhouettes (2004)

- Back on the Water
