= Happy When It Rains =

1987 single by the Jesus and Mary Chain

Single by the Jesus and Mary Chain

from the album Darklands
- B-side: "Everything's Alright When You're Down"
- Released: 3 August 1987
- Length: 3:33 (album version); 3:07 (7-inch edit)
- Label: Blanco y Negro
- Songwriters: William Reid; Jim Reid
- Producers: William Reid; Bill Price

The Jesus and Mary Chain singles chronology
"April Skies" (1987)	"Happy When It Rains" (1987)	"Darklands" (1987)

Happy When It Rains

EP by the Jesus and Mary Chain
- Released: 3 August 1987
- Label: Blanco y Negro
- Producer: William Reid; Bill Price

The Jesus and Mary Chain EP chronology
Some Candy Talking (1986)	''Happy When It Rains'' (1987)	Darklands (1987)

"Happy When It Rains" is a song by Scottish alternative rock group the Jesus and Mary Chain, released as the second single from their second studio album, Darklands (1987). It was issued through Blanco y Negro Records on 3 August 1987 and reached number 25 on the UK Singles Chart. It was released across three different formats; the 10-inch single is labelled as an extended play (EP).

== Track listing ==
All tracks were written by Jim Reid and William Reid.

7-inch single

A. "Happy When It Rains"
B. "Everything's Alright When You're Down"

7-inch limited-edition single

A1. "Happy When It Rains" (long version)
B1. "Everything's Alright When You're Down"
B2. "Shake"

10-inch EP

A1. "Happy When It Rains" (long version)
A2. "Shake"
B1. "Everything's Alright When You're Down"
B2. "Happy When It Rains" (demo)

12-inch single

A1. "Happy When It Rains" (long version)
B1. "Shake"
B2. "Happy Place"
B3. "F-Hole"

== Personnel ==
The Jesus and Mary Chain

- Jim Reid – vocals, guitar
- William Reid – guitar, production

Additional personnel

- Bill Price – production ("Happy When It Rains")
- John Loder – production ("Shake", "Everything's Alright When You're Down"), backing vocals ("Everything's Alright When You're Down")
- Linda Reid – design
- Helen Backhouse – design

== Charts ==
Chart (1987)	Peak position
Europe (European Hot 100 Singles)	67
Ireland (IRMA)	15
UK Singles (OCC)	29
