= Some Candy Talking =

1986 EP by the Jesus and Mary Chain

- 7-inch vinyl cover

Single by the Jesus and Mary Chain
- Released: 14 July 1986
- Genre: Noise pop
- Length: 9:38
- Label: Blanco y Negro
- Producers: The Jesus and Mary Chain; Phil Ward Large

The Jesus and Mary Chain EP singles chronology
"Some Candy Talking" (1986)	"Happy When It Rains" (1987)

Alternative cover
- 12-inch vinyl cover

Some Candy Talking is a single by Scottish rock band the Jesus and Mary Chain, released on 14 July 1986 by Blanco y Negro Records. The EP includes an acoustic version of "Taste of Cindy", originally taken from the band's debut studio album, Psychocandy, and a song titled "Psychocandy", which did not appear on that album. The titular song did not appear on the original pressing of Psychocandy, but was featured when the album was released on CD in 1986.

The title track is commonly misunderstood as being about heroin use. In a 2005 interview with Filter magazine, lead singer Jim Reid stated, "'Some Candy Talking' had nothing to do with drugs, actually. It was just something a radio DJ picked up on, and it was banned in all the major radio stations in the UK". The song was originally banned for this reason by BBC Radio 1 DJ Mike Smith, although it was later voted at number nine in that year's John Peel Festive 50. The song was included on the soundtrack to the 1986 film Modern Girls.

The acoustic tracks on the Double 7-inch vinyl are the four tracks recorded for the 3rd John Peel Session in October 1986, and are included on the Complete John Peel Sessions album.

The EP marked the final release that drummer Bobby Gillespie appeared on. After this release, he returned to his own band, Primal Scream.

== Track listing ==
All tracks are written by William Reid and Jim Reid.

7-inch vinyl (NEG 19)
No.	Title	Length
1.	"Some Candy Talking"	3:19
2.	"Psychocandy"	2:52
3.	"Hit"	3:27
Total length:		9:38

Double 7-inch vinyl (NEG 19F)
No.	Title	Length
1.	"Some Candy Talking"	3:19
2.	"Psychocandy"	2:52
3.	"Hit"	3:27
4.	"Cut Dead" (acoustic)	2:47
5.	"Psychocandy" (acoustic)	2:01
6.	"You Trip Me Up" (acoustic)	2:41
7.	"Some Candy Talking" (acoustic)	3:13
Total length:		20:20

12-inch vinyl (NEG 19T)
No.	Title	Length
1.	"Some Candy Talking"	3:12
2.	"Taste of Cindy" (acoustic)	1:59
3.	"Hit"	3:22
4.	"Psychocandy"	2:48
Total length:		11:21

== Personnel ==
Credits adapted from the liner notes of Some Candy Talking.

- The Jesus and Mary Chain – production on "Psychocandy", "Hit" and "Taste of Cindy"
- Flood – engineering on "Some Candy Talking"
- Alan Moulder – engineering assistance on "Some Candy Talking"
- John Loder – engineering on "Psychocandy", "Hit" and "Taste of Cindy"
- Phil Ward Large – production on "Cut Dead" (acoustic), "Psychocandy" (acoustic), "You Trip Me Up" (acoustic) and "Some Candy Talking" (acoustic)
- Mike Laye – cover photo (7-inch)
- Steve Mitchell – inside photo (7-inch)

== Charts ==
Chart performance for Some Candy Talking
Chart (1986)	Peak position
Europe (European Hot 100 Singles)	56
Ireland (IRMA)	11
New Zealand (Recorded Music NZ)	37
UK Singles (OCC)	13
