= Sound of Speed =

1993 single by the Jesus and Mary Chain

EP by the Jesus and Mary Chain
- Released: 28 June 1993
- Length: 13:02
- Label: Blanco y Negro
- Producer: William Reid; Jim Reid

The Jesus and Mary Chain EP chronology
The Peel Sessions (1991)	Sound of Speed (1993)

Sound of Speed is an extended play (EP) by Scottish rock band the Jesus & Mary Chain, released in June 1993. The EP was released by Blanco y Negro Records on 7-inch vinyl, 10-inch vinyl, cassette single, and CD single. It reached number 30 on the UK Singles Chart. William Reid and Jim Reid produced all the tracks. The Guardian called it "the last classic EP from the band" The lead song, "Snakedriver", was written for, and used in, the 1994 film The Crow.

== Track listing ==
All tracks were written by William Reid and Jim Reid except where noted.

7" (NEG66), 10" (NEG66TE, limited and numbered), and CD single (NEG66CD)

1. "Snakedriver" – 3:39
2. "Something I Can't Have" – 3:01
3. "Write Record Release Blues" – 2:56
4. "Little Red Rooster" (Willie Dixon) – 3:26
- All four tracks are on both sides of the cassette single version.

== Personnel ==
The Jesus and Mary Chain

- Jim Reid – vocals, guitar, production
- William Reid – vocal, guitar, producer

Additional personnel

- Dick Meaney – engineering

== Charts ==
Chart performance for Sound of Speed
Chart (1993)	Peak position
UK Singles (OCC)	30
