= Murray Dalglish =

Scottish Musical artist

- Born: 27 October 1967 (age 58); Bellshill, Scotland, United Kingdom
- Genres: Alternative rock
- Instrument(s): Drums, guitar
- Years active: 1984–present
- Labels: Creation

Murray Dalglish is the original drummer for the Scottish rock group The Jesus and Mary Chain from their formation in early 1984 until November 1984 when he was replaced by Bobby Gillespie. Aged 16 when he joined the band, Dalglish occasionally played a two-piece drum kit, which he did whilst standing up; this style would later be carried on in Gillespie's playing. His drumming can be heard on the band's first single "Upside Down", along with its B-side, the Syd Barrett cover "Vegetable Man". He left to become an apprentice coach builder, but has kept his hand in drumming in several bands over the years. Currently playing in 2Sevens.

Dalglish was drummer for Baby's Got a Gun, Trixie's Big Red Motorbike, The Sux Pastels and The Decay, 2Sevens and as of 2014, he owns a hair salon in East Kilbride.
