= Mark Crozer =

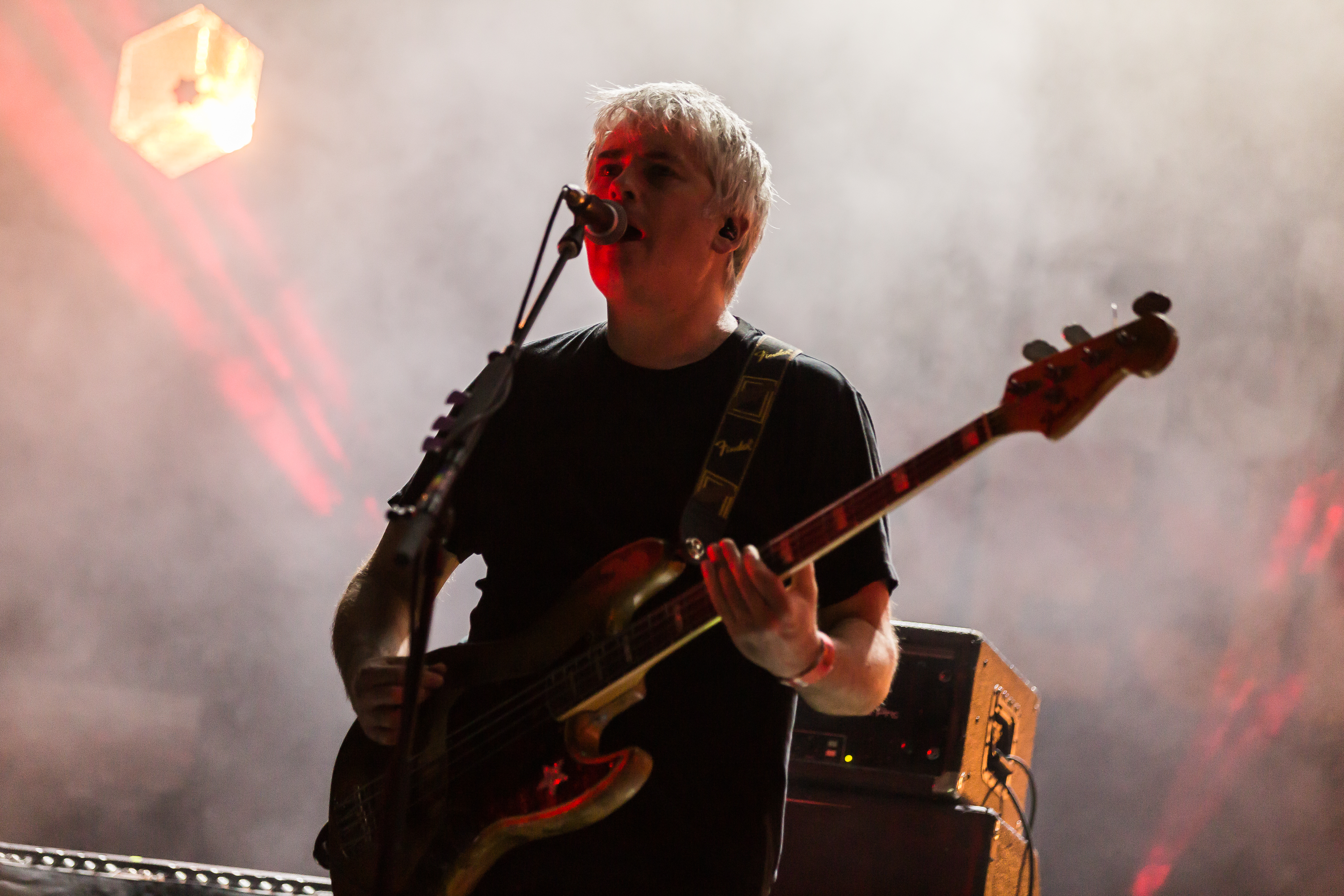
- Crozer in 2018

Background information
- Born: Cambridge, England
- Genres: Alternative rock, Power pop
- Occupations: Musician, singer-songwriter, producer
- Instruments: Vocals, guitar, bass
- Years active: 1990–present
- Website: markcrozer.com

Mark Crozer is an English musician. He grew up in Oxford, England, attending Cherwell School and later became a touring member of the Scottish alternative rock band The Jesus and Mary Chain.

== Musical career ==
Early in his career, Crozer released two solo albums: Shining Down On Me (1999) and Unnatural World (2002).

Later he became the bass player in The Jesus and Mary Chain's Jim Reid solo backing band. With Jim, Mark toured the UK and Europe, and recorded the single "Dead End Kids" and a version of The Beatles' "And Your Bird Can Sing" for Mojo magazine.

When The Jesus and Mary Chain reformed in 2007, Mark was asked to play rhythm guitar. His first show with the band was at The Glasshouse in Pomona, a low-key warm-up set, before the Coachella festival in California, where the band was joined onstage by actress Scarlett Johansson, who filled the role of backing vocalist.

As well as appearing in The Jesus and Mary Chain, Crozer played in his own band named International Jetsetters with fellow JAMC bandmate Loz Colbert.

In 2012, WWE bought rights to Crozer's song "Broken Out in Love", renamed it "Live in Fear" and used it as the entrance theme for wrestler Bray Wyatt and The Wyatt Family. The same year, Mark Crozer and The Rels released their eponymous debut album and followed it up with Backburner, a new mini-album in 2013. At WWE's WrestleMania XXX pay-per-view event in April 2014, Crozer and the Rels performed "Live In Fear" live for Bray Wyatt's entrance to an attendance of 75,167.

In January 2016, Crozer contributed vocals and guitars to NYC rapper Consequence's "A Good Comeback Story" EP. In late 2016, Mark Crozer and the Rels released their second album Sunny Side Down, produced by Mitch Easter.

== Personal life ==
After a number of years living in Charlotte, North Carolina where he fronted Mark Crozer and The Rels he now lives in New York City, NY.
