= Lazycame =

Lazycame is the stage name and performing name of Scottish singer-songwriter William Reid. Reid began performing as Lazycame after the breakup of the Jesus and Mary Chain, in which he played guitar and occasionally sang, in 1999.

Critical reaction to Lazycame was mixed, but largely positive, with the NME describing the 1999 debut album as "a sometimes harrowing exercise in catharsis", and the 2000 EP Yawn as "easily the best thing William Reid has touched in years".

== Discography ==
=== Albums ===
- Finbegin (1999)

1. God
2. Complicated
3. 510 Lovers
4. Rokit
5. Gogetfind (Iseeinyoumei)
6. Fornicate	  
7. Unfinished Business	
8. Bluejune	  
9. Naturallow	  
10. Mcintoshlost

- Saturday the Fourteenth (2000)

1. Drizzle	  	  
2. Last Days of Creation	  	  
3. Lo Fi Li	  	  
4. Fucko You Genius	  	  
5. You Don't Belong	  	  
6. Kill Kool Kid	  	  
7. Kissround	  	  
8. Muswil Clouds	  	  
9. Tired of Fucking	  	  
10. Mayhem	  	  
11. Everyone Knows	  	  
12. Dement	  	  
13. Unamerican

=== EPs ===
- Yawn (2000)
- Drizzle
- K To Be Lost
- Who Killed Manchester?
- Male Wife
- Commercial
