= Never Understand =

Single by The Jesus and Mary Chain

from the album Psychocandy
- B-side: "Suck"
- Released: February 1985
- Genre: Noise pop; punk-pop
- Length: 2:54
- Label: Blanco y Negro
- Songwriters: William Reid, Jim Reid
- Producers: The Jesus and Mary Chain

The Jesus and Mary Chain singles chronology
| "Upside Down" (1984) | "Never Understand" (1985) | "You Trip Me Up" (1985) |

"Never Understand" is the first single from the Scottish alternative rock band The Jesus and Mary Chain's debut album Psychocandy. It was the band's first release on Blanco y Negro Records and was released through them in February 1985. The song was written by William Reid and Jim Reid, and was produced by The Jesus and Mary Chain. It is considered influential for its use of guitar feedback.

== Chart performance ==
The single reached number 47 on the UK Singles Chart.

== Critical reception ==
The song was ranked number 1 among the "Tracks of the Year" for 1985 by NME.

Spin wrote, "On "Never Understand" the feedback shrieks like the zealous adolescent screams that drowned out the Beatles on every live record." John Leland added, "The effect is striking, but it has no depth and doesn't go anywhere after the first few seconds. In Hüsker Dü's music, the buzzing guitar and pop hooks enhance one another; Jesus and Mary Chain never puts the two together."

== Track listing ==
All tracks written by Jim Reid and William Reid, except where noted.

7" (NEG 8)

1. "Never Understand" – 2:54
2. "Suck" – 2:07

12" (NEG 8T)

1. "Never Understand" – 2:54
2. "Suck" – 2:07
3. "Ambition" (Vic Godard) – 3:31

== Personnel ==
=== The Jesus and Mary Chain ===
- Jim Reid – vocals, producer
- William Reid – guitar, producer
- Douglas Hart – bass, producer
- Bobby Gillespie – drums, producer
