= Rollercoaster (EP) =

EP by The Jesus and Mary Chain
- Released: September 1990
- Genre: Alternative rock
- Label: Blanco y Negro
- Producers: William Reid, Jim Reid

The Jesus and Mary Chain EP chronology
Darklands (1987)	Rollercoaster (1990)	The Peel Sessions (1991)

Cassette cover

Rollercoaster is an extended play (EP) by the Scottish rock band The Jesus & Mary Chain, released in September 1990. The EP was released by Blanco y Negro Records on 7-inch vinyl, 12-inch vinyl, cassette single and CD single. It reached number 46 on the UK Singles Chart and number 25 on the Irish Singles Chart. William Reid and Jim Reid were the producers for all the tracks.

== Track listing ==
All tracks written by Jim Reid and William Reid except where noted.

7" (NEG45), 12" (NEG45T), CD (NEG45CD) and Cassette (NEG45C)

1. "Rollercoaster" – 3:50
2. "Silverblade" – 2:55
3. "Lowlife" – 3:25
4. "Tower of Song" (Leonard Cohen) – 4:48
- All four tracks are on both sides of the cassette single version.

== Personnel ==
=== The Jesus and Mary Chain ===
- Jim Reid – vocals, guitar, producer
- William Reid – guitar, vocal (track 1), producer, engineer (track 4)

=== Additional personnel ===
- Flood – engineer (tracks 1 to 3)
- Ian Cooper – mastering

== Charts ==
Chart (1990)	Peak position
Australia ARIA Charts	110
UK Singles Chart	46
Irish Singles Chart	25
