= Reverence (song) =

1992 single by the Jesus and Mary Chain

Single by the Jesus and Mary Chain

from the album Honey's Dead
- B-side: "Heat"
- Released: 3 February 1992
- Genre: Electronic rock
- Length: 3:40
- Label: Blanco y Negro
- Songwriters: William Reid, Jim Reid
- Producers: Jim Reid, William Reid

The Jesus and Mary Chain singles chronology
"Head On" (1989)	"Reverence" (1992)	"Far Gone and Out" (1992)

"Reverence" is a song by Scottish alternative rock group the Jesus and Mary Chain, released as the first single from the group's fourth studio album, Honey's Dead (1992). It was released by Blanco y Negro Records on 3 February 1992, reaching number 10 on the UK Single Chart and number 21 in Ireland. BBC TV banned the song from airing due to the lyrics "I want to die just like Jesus Christ / I want to die just like J-F-K", but it was not banned from BBC Radio One.

== Track listings ==
All tracks were written by Jim Reid and William Reid, except where noted.

UK 7-inch and cassette single

1. "Reverence"
2. "Heat"

UK 12-inch and CD single

1. "Reverence"
2. "Heat"
3. "Reverence" (radio mix)
4. "Guitarman" (Jerry Reed)

US maxi-CD single

1. "Reverence" (album version) – 3:40
2. "Reverence" (Jim and William Reid mix) – 5:38
3. "Reverence" (Al Jourgensen mix) – 6:09
4. "Reverence" (Mark Stent mix) – 6:46
5. "Guitarman" – 3:42

== Personnel ==
The Jesus and Mary Chain

- Jim Reid – vocals, guitar, production
- William Reid – guitar, production

Additional personnel

- Alan Moulder – engineering ("Reverence", "Guitarman")
- Dick Meaney – engineering ("Heat")
- Anjali Dutt – engineering (radio mix)
- Al Jourgensen – remixing (Al Jourgensen mix)
- Mark Stent – remixing (Mark Stent mix)

== Charts ==
Chart (1992)	Peak position
Europe (Eurochart Hot 100)	42
Ireland (IRMA)	21
UK Singles (Official Charts)	10
