= Sometimes Always =

1994 single by the Jesus and Mary Chain

Single by the Jesus and Mary Chain

from the album Stoned & Dethroned
- B-side: "The Perfect Crime"
- Released: 18 July 1994
- Genre: Alternative rock
- Label: Blanco y Negro
- Songwriter: William Reid
- Producers: Jim Reid, William Reid

The Jesus and Mary Chain singles chronology
"Almost Gold" (1992)	"Sometimes Always" (1994)	"Come On" (1994)

"Sometimes Always" is a song by the Scottish alternative rock group the Jesus and Mary Chain, released in July 1994, by Blanco y Negro Records, as the first single from the group's fifth album, Stoned & Dethroned (1994). Written by William Reid, the song is a duet between Jim Reid and Mazzy Star's Hope Sandoval. The song was a moderate commercial hit in the UK while also making some noise on the alternative circuit in the US. It has since seen critical acclaim as one of the best songs from the Stoned & Dethroned album.

== Background ==
"Sometimes Always" was written by Jesus and Mary Chain guitarist William Reid, who felt that the song sounded like a Lee Hazlewood and Nancy Sinatra duet. The band then recruited Mazzy Star vocalist Hope Sandoval to sing the female lead alongside Jesus and Mary Chain lead singer Jim Reid. William Reid commented, "We'd always liked Hope's voice. We asked her years ago to be on one of the records, but there was never a song that suited. Then this one came along and it felt right."

Initially, the band worried that the song was "a bit too cute, too light a story," according to William Reid. However, as he stated, "When we recorded it, Hope and Jim sang and they just transcended it." By the time the song was recorded, Sandoval was known to be a "good friend" to William, hinting at the pair's affair that would come to light. Sandoval would also appear alongside the band in the song's video.

== Release ==
"Sometimes Always" was selected by the band as the first single from their 1994 album Stoned & Dethroned. The single was released by Blanco y Negro Records on 18 July 1994 and reached No. 22 on the UK Single Chart. "Sometimes Always" peaked at No. 62 on the Australian ARIA Singles Chart in August 1994. It also reached No. 4 on the US Alternative Songs chart, the band's last song to appear on that chart. It also became the band's only song to appear on the Billboard Hot 100, debuting and peaking at No. 96.

A poster for the single can be seen in the Bottom episode "Terror" while the song itself appears in the 1995 film The Doom Generation.

== Reception ==
"Sometimes Always" saw positive critical reception and was often named a highlight from Stoned & Dethroned. Upon the release, Larry Flick from Billboard magazine wrote, "Onetime purveyors of feedback pop return with a light, acoustic toe-tapper that places soothing vocals and melody above its jangly guitars. Guest vocalist Hope Sandoval adds a fluttering breeze to a tune that is already wooing the hearts of alternative programmers." In a retrospective review, Ned Raggett of AllMusic wrote, "'Sometimes Always' does indeed make for a lovely little duet," while Drowned In Sound dubbed it the album's "best known and ultimately standout moment." Martin Aston from Music Week gave it a score of four out of five. Pitchfork also named the song a "standout" on Stoned & Dethroned, while Tom Breihan of Stereogum said that the song is a "classic" and that it "rules so hard."

== Music video ==
The accompanying music video for "Sometimes Always" was directed by British director Sophie Muller and produced by Rob Small for Oil Factory. It was released on 18 July 1994 and features marital discord played out in an American bar. Muller also directed the video for "Come On" and designed the album artwork for Stoned & Dethroned.

== Track listings ==
- 7-inch (NEG70)
1. "Sometimes Always" (William Reid) – 2:32
2. "The Perfect Crime" (Jim Reid) – 1:32
- 10-inch (NEG70TE, limited and numbered) and CD (NEG70CD)
1. "Sometimes Always" (W. Reid) – 2:32
2. "The Perfect Crime" (J. Reid) – 1:32
3. "Little Stars" (W. Reid) – 3:29
4. "Drop-Re-Recorded" (W. Reid) – 1:50

== Personnel ==
- Jim Reid – vocals, guitar, producer
- William Reid – guitar, producer
- Hope Sandoval - vocals ("Sometimes Always")
- Dick Meaney – engineer

== Charts ==
Chart (1994)	Peak position
Australia (ARIA)	62
Canada Top Singles (RPM)	72
Europe (Eurochart Hot 100)	86
UK Singles (Official Charts)	22
UK Airplay (Music Week)	30
US Billboard Hot 100	96
US Alternative Airplay (Billboard)	4

== Cover versions ==
The song was recorded as a duet by Courtney Jaye and Ben Bridwell of Band of Horses on Jaye's 2010 album, The Exotic Sounds of Courtney Jaye and by The Brakes on their 2005 album "Give Blood", duetting with Becki and Julia of The Pipettes. In 2020, Hatchie and The Pains of Being Pure at Heart recorded a duet cover.
