= Stoned & Dethroned =

Studio album by The Jesus and Mary Chain
- Released: 23 August 1994
- Recorded: January–November 1993
- Genre: Alternative rock
- Length: 47:45
- Labels: Blanco y Negro, American Recordings
- Producers: Jim Reid, William Reid

The Jesus and Mary Chain chronology
The Sound of Speed (1993)	Stoned & Dethroned (1994)	Hate Rock 'n' Roll (1995)

Singles from Stoned & Dethroned
- 1. "Sometimes Always" Released: 18 July 1994; 2. "Come On" Released: October 1994

Professional ratings
Review scores
Source	Rating
AllMusic	3.5/5 stars
Drowned in Sound	6/10
Entertainment Weekly	B+
NME	8/10
Paste	3.5/5 stars
Pitchfork Media	7.6/10
Rolling Stone	4/5 stars
The Rolling Stone Album Guide	3.5/5 stars
Select	2/5 medals

Stoned & Dethroned is the fifth studio album by the Scottish alternative rock band The Jesus and Mary Chain. After spending most of 1992 touring, including a slot on that year's Lollapalooza tour, the band went into the studio during January 1993 with the notion of recording an acoustic album. For the first time since Psychocandy, JAMC recorded with a full band with Steve Monti from Curve playing drums and touring bassist Ben Lurie. The recording took longer than planned, lasting the better part of a year. The album also features lead vocals from guests Shane MacGowan from The Pogues on "God Help Me" and Mazzy Star's Hope Sandoval, singing a duet with Jim Reid on "Sometimes Always", which was the album's first single.

As of May 1998 the album has sold 121,000 copies in United States according to Nielsen SoundScan.

== Singles ==
The song "Come On" was released in October 1994 as the second single from Stoned & Dethroned. It reached number 52 in the UK singles chart.

== Track listing ==
All songs written by William Reid, except where noted.

1. "Dirty Water" – 3:08
2. "Bullet Lovers" – 3:39
3. "Sometimes Always" – 2:32
4. "Come On" (J. Reid) – 2:13
5. "Between Us" – 2:59
6. "Hole" (Jim Reid) – 2:15
7. "Never Saw It Coming" – 3:32
8. "She" (Jim Reid) – 3:08
9. "Wish I Could" – 2:42
10. "Save Me" (J. Reid, W. Reid) – 2:43
11. "Till It Shines" – 3:17
12. "God Help Me" – 2:47
13. "Girlfriend" – 3:16
14. "Everybody I Know" – 2:13
15. "You've Been a Friend" (J. Reid) – 3:37
16. "These Days" – 2:31
17. "Feeling Lucky" – 2:18

== Personnel ==
=== The Jesus and Mary Chain ===
- Jim Reid – vocals (tracks 1–4, 6, 8, 10, 13–15), guitar, bass (tracks 6, 12, 13, 14), shaker (track 17), production
- William Reid – vocals (tracks 5, 7, 9–11, 16, 17), guitar, bass (track 17), production
- Ben Lurie – guitar, harmonica, organ, bass
- Steve Monti – drums, percussion

=== Additional personnel ===
- Hope Sandoval – vocals (track 3)
- Shane MacGowan – vocals (track 12)
- Alan Moulder – engineer (tracks 1, 2, 9, 11, 14), mixing (tracks 1, 2, 7, 9, 13, 14)
- Dick Meaney – engineer (tracks 3 to 8, 10, 12, 13, 15 to 17), mixing (tracks 3 to 6, 8, 10 to 12, 15 to 17)
- Stylorouge – design
- Sophie Muller – photography
