= Far Gone and Out =

1992 single by the Jesus and Mary Chain

Single by the Jesus and Mary Chain

from the album Honey's Dead
- B-side: "Why'd You Want Me?"
- Released: 2 March 1992
- Length: 2:49
- Label: Blanco y Negro
- Songwriters: William Reid, Jim Reid
- Producers: Jim Reid, William Reid

The Jesus and Mary Chain singles chronology
"Reverence" (1992)	"Far Gone and Out" (1992)	"Almost Gold" (1992)

"Far Gone and Out" is a song by Scottish alternative rock group the Jesus and Mary Chain, released as the second single from their fourth studio album, Honey's Dead (1992). It was released by Blanco y Negro Records in March 1992 and reached number 23 on the UK Single Chart. "Far Gone and Out" also peaked at number 88 on the Australian ARIA Singles Chart in May 1992.

== Track listings ==
All tracks were written by Jim Reid and William Reid.

- UK 7-inch single
1. "Far Gone and Out"
2. "Why'd You Want Me?"
- UK 12-inch single

A1. "Far Gone and Out"
B1. "Sometimes"
B2. "Why'd You Want Me?"

- UK 12-inch box set

A1. "Far Gone and Out"
A2. "Reverence" (Al Jourgensen mix)
B1. "Sometimes"
B2. "Why'd You Want Me?"

- UK CD single
1. "Far Gone and Out"
2. "Why'd You Want Me?"
3. "Sometimes"
- US maxi-CD single
1. "Far Gone and Out" – 2:49
2. "Far Gone and Out" (Arc Weld mix) – 5:03
3. "Why'd You Want Me?" – 3:13
4. "Sometimes" – 2:52

== Personnel ==
The Jesus and Mary Chain

- Jim Reid – vocals, guitar, production
- William Reid – guitar, production

Additional personnel

- Alan Moulder – engineering ("Far Gone and Out")
- Dick Meaney – engineering ("Sometimes", "Why'd You Want Me")
- Al Jourgensen – remixing (Al Jourgensen mix)
- George Drakoulias – remixing (Arc Weld mix)

== Charts ==
=== Weekly charts ===
Chart (1992)	Peak position
Australia (ARIA)	88
UK Singles (Official Charts)	23
UK Airplay (Music Week)	40
US Alternative Airplay (Billboard)	3

=== Year-end charts ===
Chart (1992)	Position
US Modern Rock Tracks (Billboard)	5

== Release history ==
Region	Date	Format(s)	Label(s)	Ref.
United Kingdom	2 March 1992	7-inch vinyl; 12-inch vinyl; CD; cassette	Blanco y Negro	
Australia	30 March 1992	CD; cassette	Blanco y Negro	
