= Ben Lurie =

British musician

- Born: 13 June 1968 (age 57) London, England
- Genres: Alternative rock
- Occupation: Guitarist
- Instrument(s): Guitar, bass
- Years active: 1989–2004
- Labels: Creation, Blanco y Negro, Sub Pop

Ben Lurie (born 13 June 1968) is a British musician, best known as a member of the Scottish alternative rock band the Jesus and Mary Chain from 1989 to 1998.

== Biography ==
Ben Lurie was born in London and moved to Australia when he was four. In high school, he formed the band Sons of Sorrow with bassist Warwick Yuen and drummer Paul Zezula. Their album Nobody Should Dream was released in 1988 on Rampant Releases. He returned to London at the age of 20, where he joined the Jesus and Mary Chain as a session musician for the Automatic tour. After the tour, he became a regular session member and featured on the albums Stoned & Dethroned and Munki. After the band split up in 1998, Ben together with Jim Reid formed the band Freeheat. Lurie also produced records by other bands such as the Parkinsons and Tompaulin.

Lurie moved back to Australia in 2004, where he currently works as a graphic designer.
