= Nick Sanderson =

- Born: 22 April 1961; Sheffield, England
- Died: 8 June 2008 (aged 47)
- Genres: Alternative rock
- Occupations: Musician, train driver
- Instruments: Drums, vocals
- Years active: 1982–2008
- Labels: Deceptive Records, Fruition

Nick Sanderson (22 April 1961 – 8 June 2008) was an English musician, most famous for being the front man in Earl Brutus, and a short-term member of the Scottish alternative rock band the Jesus and Mary Chain.

== Musical career ==
Sanderson started his professional career in the early 1980s by becoming the drummer in the Sheffield post-punk group Clock DVA. After that he drummed for the re-formed punk-blues group The Gun Club. He later joined World of Twist, a Manchester-based group.

In the early 1990s, Sanderson became a lyricist and singer in Earl Brutus. The band eventually signed a deal with the Island Records subsidiary Fruition. The two Earl Brutus albums, Your Majesty. . . We Are Here (1996) and Tonight You Are the Special One (1998) received critical acclaim, but did not make the charts.

In 1998, he also played for the Jesus and Mary Chain on their album Munki, and for Jim Reid's Freeheat, in addition to writing "Male Wife" with William Reid on Lazycame's album Yawn! in 2000.

== Personal life ==
Sanderson was married to the Gun Club's Japanese bassist, Romi Mori, with whom he had a son, Syd.

After Earl Brutus's commercial failure, Sanderson got a job as an engine driver on the Brighton to London line.

He died of lung cancer in 2008. A tribute concert was held in his remembrance.
