= Blues from a Gun =

Single by The Jesus and Mary Chain

from the album Automatic
- B-side: "Shimmer"
- Released: September 1989
- Genre: Alternative rock; blues rock; garage rock; glam rock
- Length: 4:44 (Edit)
- Label: Blanco Y Negro
- Songwriters: William Reid, Jim Reid

The Jesus and Mary Chain singles chronology
"Sidewalking" (1988)	"Blues from a Gun" (1989)	"Head On" (1989)

"Blues from a Gun" is a song by Scottish alternative rock band The Jesus and Mary Chain. It serves as the lead single to the band's fourth studio album Automatic (1989) and was released in four different formats, including a 3" Mini CD single in a paper gatefold sleeve.

The single reached number 32 in the UK single charts, and was also a hit for the band in the US, topping the Modern Rock charts for three weeks. It is also one of the few singles by the band featuring lead vocals from William Reid, as opposed to Jim Reid.

== Reception ==
Denise Sullivan writing for AllMusic felt, "The Jesus & Mary Chain's song themes can be narrowed down to a couple: shooting drugs, shooting your head off, and shooting your mouth off. "Blues From a Gun" typifies all three in one great verse-chorus-verse song with a coda."

== Track listing ==
All tracks written by Jim Reid and William Reid, except where noted.

7" (NEG41)

1. "Blues from a Gun" - 4:43
2. "Shimmer" - 2:45

10" (NEG41TE) Gatefold

1. "Blues from a Gun" - 4:43
2. "Shimmer" - 2:45
3. "Penetration" - 2:46
4. "Break Me Down" - 2:23

12" (NEG41T)

1. "Blues from a Gun" - 4:43
2. "Shimmer" - 2:45
3. "Penetration" - 2:46
4. "Subway" - 2:04

CD3 (NEG41CD)

1. "Blues from a Gun" - 4:43
2. "Shimmer" - 2:45
3. "Penetration" - 2:46
4. "My Girl" (Smokey Robinson, Ronald White) - 2:31

== Personnel ==
=== The Jesus and Mary Chain ===
- Jim Reid – guitar, synthesizer, drum programming, producer
- William Reid – vocals, guitar, synthesizer, drum programming, producer

=== Additional personnel ===
- Alan Moulder – engineer (track 1)
- Andrew Catlin – photography

== Charts ==
Chart (1989–90)	Peak position
UK Singles (OCC)	32
US Alternative Airplay (Billboard)	1

== See also ==
- List of Billboard number-one alternative singles of the 1980s
