= Blanco y Negro Records =

UK record label

Blanco y Negro
- Parent company: WEA Records Ltd. (Warner Music Group)
- Founded: 1983
- Founder: Geoff Travis, Mike Alway
- Status: Defunct
- Distributor: Warner Bros. Records -->Atlantic Records (UK)
- Genre: Various
- Country of origin: United Kingdom
- Location: London

Blanco y Negro Records (Spanish: "White and Black"), a subsidiary of WEA Records Ltd., was established in 1983 by Geoff Travis of Rough Trade Records and Mike Alway of él Records. Michel Duval of Les Disques du Crépuscule was also involved with the label.

Blanco y Negro was the label of Queen Adreena, Everything but the Girl, the Jesus and Mary Chain, Eddi Reader, the Dream Academy, Dinosaur Jr., Sudden Sway, Bernthøler, A House, Catatonia, the Veils and, reportedly, Elizabeth Fraser, former vocalist of Cocteau Twins. It also signed folk supergroup Equation and Irish singer Cara Dillon who also was signed to the label with partner Sam Lakeman.

== See also ==
- List of record labels
