= William Reid (musician) =

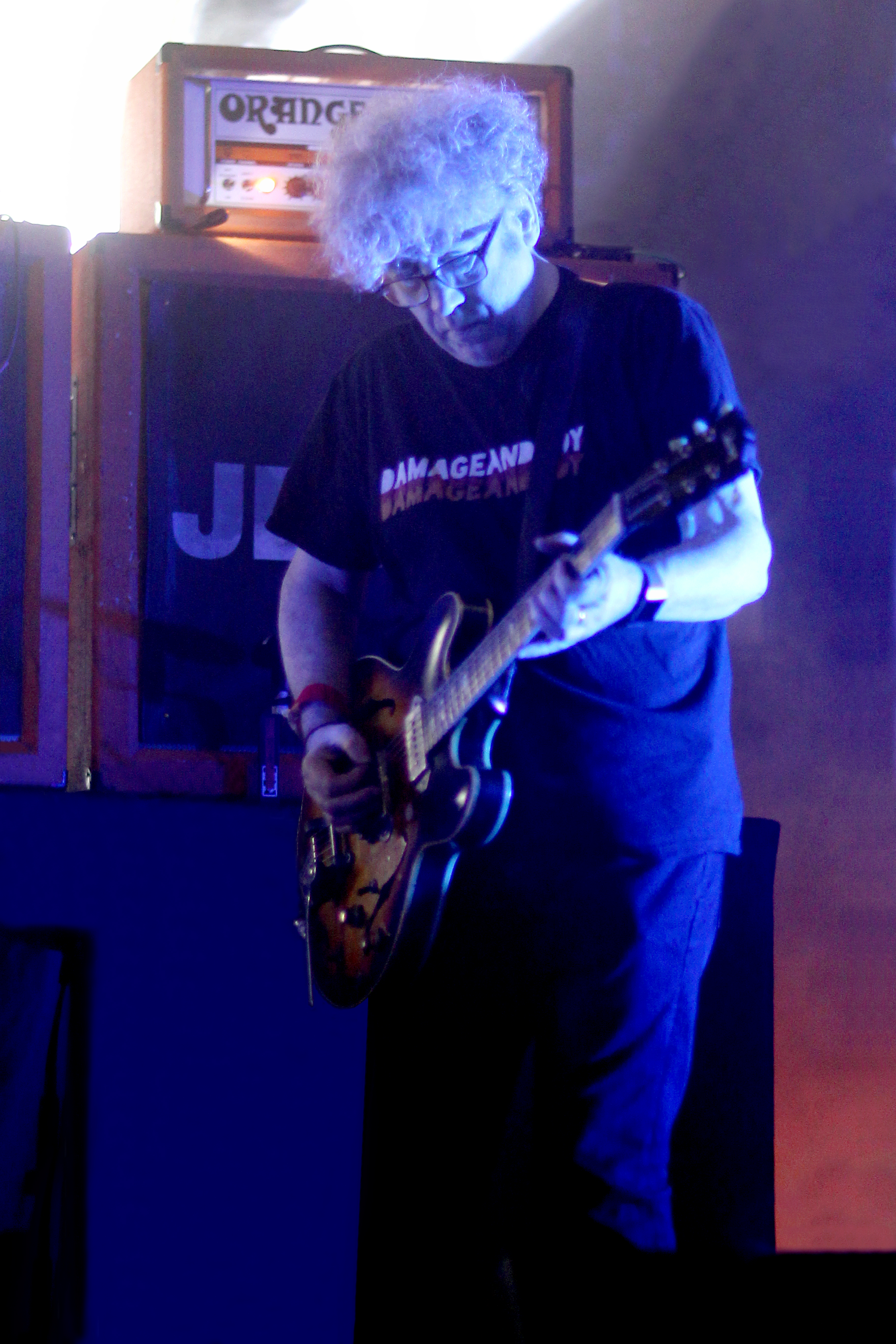
- Reid with Jesus and Mary Chain in 2018

Background information
- Also known as: Lazycame
- Born: William Adam Reid; 28 October 1958 (age 67); Glasgow
- Origin: East Kilbride, Lanarkshire, Scotland
- Genres: Alternative rock
- Occupations: Singer-songwriter; musician; composer
- Instruments: Guitar, bass guitar, synthesizer, vocals
- Years active: 1983–present
- Labels: Creation; Blanco y Negro; Sub Pop
- Member of: The Jesus and Mary Chain

William Adam Reid (born 28 October 1958) is a Scottish musician, best known for being the lead guitarist, main songwriter, and co-founder of the Scottish alternative rock band, the Jesus and Mary Chain.

== Musical career ==
=== The Jesus and Mary Chain ===
William, along with his brother Jim, the lead singer, formed the (at times unstable) core of the band. The early sound of the Jesus and Mary Chain was defined by Reid's extremely distorted and feedback laden hollowbody guitar work, often using the Shin-ei Companion WF-8 fuzz-wah box to get his unique sound, which verged on white noise. Reid effectively ended the band in late 1998, when he walked off stage fifteen minutes into a show at the House of Blues.

The Jesus and Mary Chain reformed in early 2007 to play concert dates in Europe and the US.

=== Solo ===
After the Jesus and Mary Chain split up in 1999, Reid began performing solo under the name Lazycame. Reid has also been involved in the production of the Sister Vanilla album, Little Pop Rock, featuring the Reid brothers' younger sister, Linda Reid.

== Personal life ==
Born in Glasgow, Reid was raised in East Kilbride. He attended Hunter High School.

== Discography ==
=== The Jesus and Mary Chain ===
- Psychocandy (1985)
- Darklands (1987)
- Automatic (1989)
- Honey's Dead (1992)
- Stoned & Dethroned (1994)
- Munki (1998)
- Damage and Joy (2017)
- Glasgow Eyes (2024)

=== As William ===
- Tired of Fucking (4-track EP) (1998) - UK #198

=== As Lazycame ===
- Taster (6-track EP) (1999)
- Finbegin (album) (1999)
- Yawn! (5 tracks + 14 hidden tracks) (2000)
- Saturday the Fourteenth (album) (2000)
