= Jim Reid =

Scottish singer

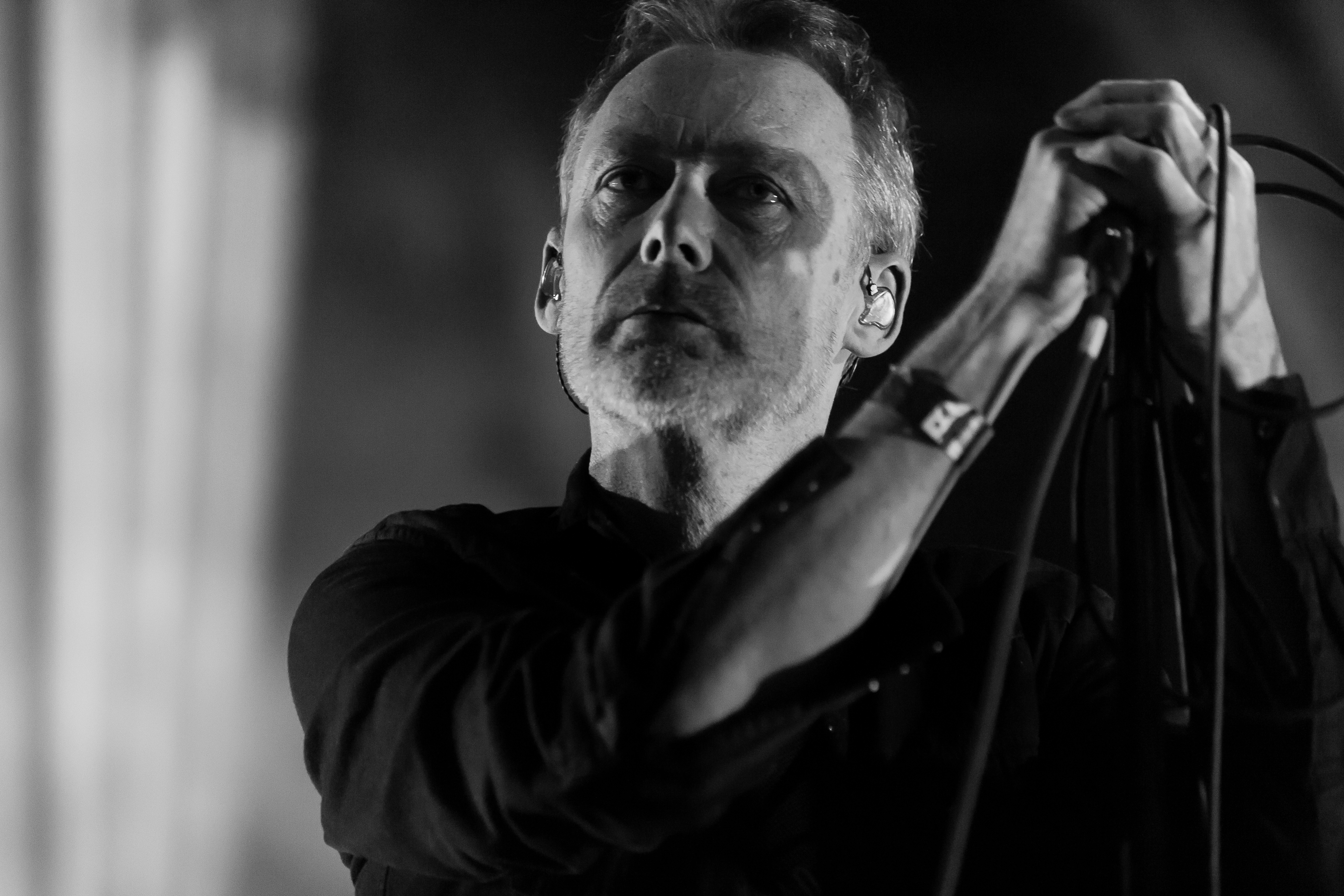
- Reid with Jesus and Mary Chain in 2018

Background information
- Born: James McLeish Reid; 29 December 1961 (age 63); Glasgow, Scotland
- Genres: Alternative rock
- Occupation(s): Singer, musician, songwriter
- Instrument(s): Vocals, guitar
- Years active: 1983–present
- Member of: Jesus and Mary Chain, Freeheat

James McLeish Reid (born 29 December 1961) is a Scottish singer, songwriter and the lead singer for the alternative rock band The Jesus and Mary Chain, which he formed with his elder brother and guitarist William Reid in 1983.

== Career ==
=== The Jesus and Mary Chain ===
Reid is the lead singer and founding member of the alternative rock band The Jesus and Mary Chain. He formed the band with his brother William. They are recognized as key figures in the development of the shoegaze and noise pop subgenres. They released six studio albums before they split up in 1999. They reformed in March 2007 and are still active as of 2024, and Reid and his brother are the only constant members of the group.

=== Freeheat ===
Reid went on to form the band Freeheat with former Mary Chain drummer Nick Sanderson and guitarist Ben Lurie. Freeheat did several tours and released two EP's, Don't Worry Be Happy and Retox, and released one studio album, Back on the Water (2006) The members went their separate ways in 2003.

=== Solo ===
Reid released his first solo single "Song for a Secret" in 2005 on the Transistor record label, and released a follow-up called "Dead End Kids" in July 2006 also on Transistor. Since April 2006 he has been playing with a new band that features Phil King (Felt, Lush, Jesus and Mary Chain) on lead guitar, Loz Colbert (Ride) on drums and Mark Crozer on bass. The band has performed his new material at several low key gigs including Whelans in Dublin and, later, the Carling Bar Academy in Islington.

== Personal life ==
Born in Glasgow, Reid was raised in East Kilbride and attended Hunter High School. He lives in Sidmouth, Devon with his wife Julie Reid and has two daughters.

== Discography ==
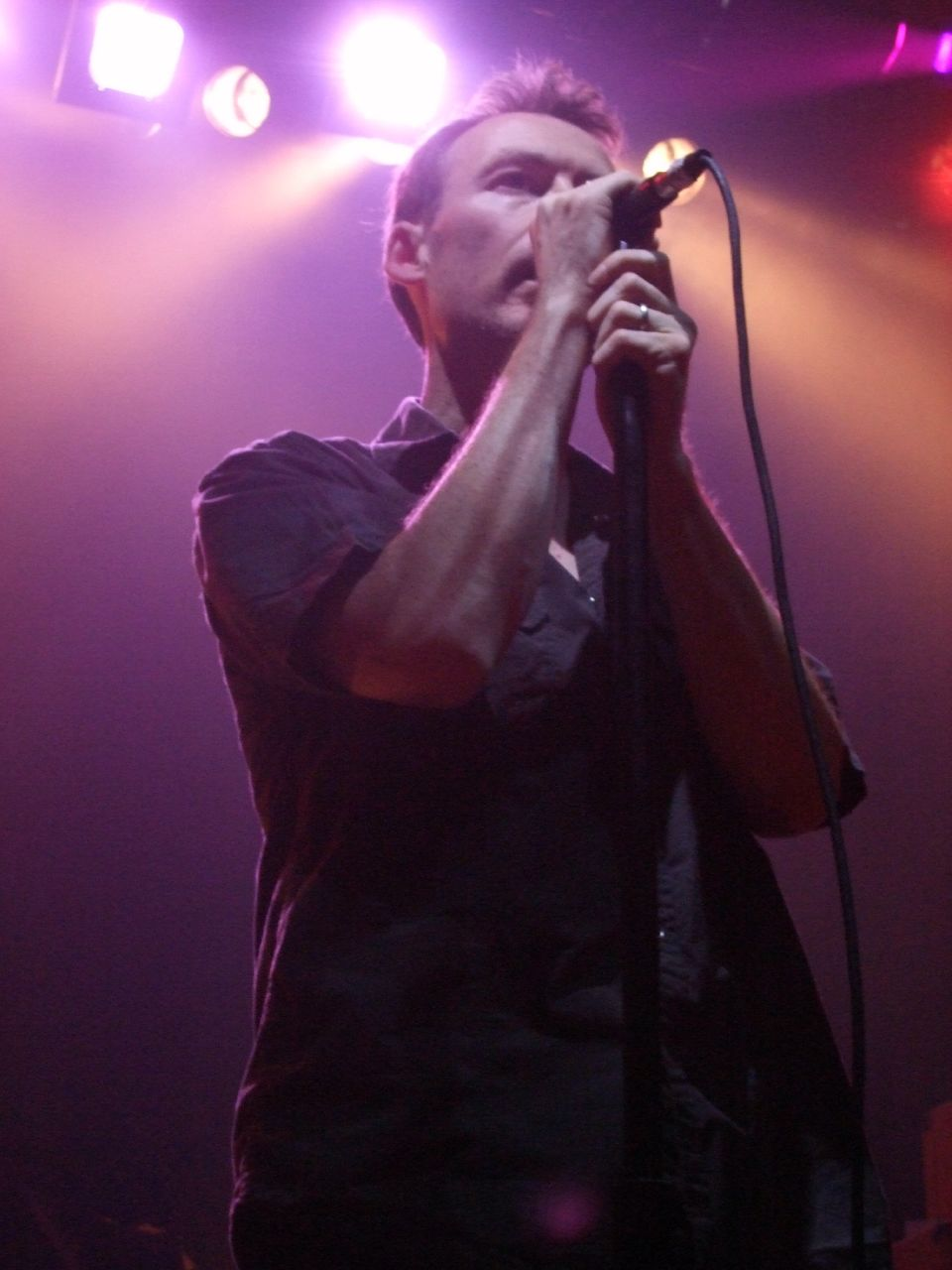
Reid performing in 2007

=== Freeheat ===
Extended Plays

- "Don't Worry Be Happy" (2000)
- "Retox" (2002)

Studio albums

- "Back on the Water" (2006)

=== Solo ===
- "Song for a Secret" – single (2005)
- "Dead End Kids" – single (2006)
