= The Menace (album) =

Studio album by Elastica
- Released: 3 April 2000
- Recorded: November 1996, September–October 1999
- Studios: Bad Earth; Eastcote, London
- Genres: Alternative rock; indie rock; post-punk
- Length: 38:39
- Label: Deceptive
- Producers: Marc Waterman, Elastica, Alan Moulder, Bruce Lampcov

Elastica chronology
6 Track EP (1999)	The Menace (2000)	The Radio One Sessions (2001)

Singles from The Menace
- 1. "How He Wrote Elastica Man" Released: 1999; 2. "Mad Dog God Dam" Released: 2000

The Menace is the second and final studio album by English rock band Elastica, released in the UK via Deceptive Records on 3 April 2000, and internationally on 22 August 2000 through Atlantic Records.

== Background ==
After the release of their eponymous debut record in 1995, the band started touring and in the process started partying ferociously and dabbling in drugs. The first attempt to record their second work was in France and Ireland at the end of 1996, but internal problems caused the departure of members (including vocalist/guitarist Donna Matthews and bassist Annie Holland) and the temporary dissolution of the group.

Leader Justine Frischmann, who had recently broken up with boyfriend Damon Albarn of Blur, started to work on Brian Eno-influenced mood music with flatmate Loz Hardy of Kingmaker, resulting on tracks like "Miami Nice" and "My Sex", which ended up on the album. Frischmann reconnected with Annie Holland in early 1999 and formed a new line-up of the band, including Justin Welch, keyboardist/vocalist Sharon Mew, formerly of Heave, guitarist Paul Jones (Linoleum's former member) and keyboardist Dave Bush, formerly of The Fall.

The band listened to previous recordings of the material and decided to re-do it all in the autumn of 1999. Recording took only six weeks and cost around £10,000. Bush's ex-bandmate Mark E. Smith participated in the writing and recording process of two songs in the album, "How He Wrote Elastica Man" – (a play on the title of the Fall's 1980 single "How I Wrote 'Elastic Man'"), and "KB". The album also features two early sessions with Donna Matthews ("Image Change" and "How He Wrote Elastica Man") and a Trio cover, "Da Da Da", featuring the keyboards of Damon Albarn, under the anagram alias Norman Balda.

In a 2013 interview, Frischmann would reveal her regrets over the album's worth by claiming Elastica should have been a "one-album project".

The cover photograph was taken by visual artist and musician Maya Arulpragasam, later to be known as M.I.A., who also directed the video for "Mad Dog God Dam" and designed the cover for the band's last single "The Bitch Don't Work".

== Reception ==
Professional ratings
Aggregate scores
Source	Rating
Metacritic	69/100
Review scores
Source	Rating
AllMusic	4/5 stars
Christgau's Consumer Guide	A−
Entertainment Weekly	C
The Guardian	4/5 stars
Los Angeles Times	2/4 stars
NME	6/10
Q	3/5 stars
Rolling Stone	4/5 stars
The Rolling Stone Album Guide	3/5 stars
Select	3/5

The album reached number 24 on the UK Albums Chart.

At Metacritic, which assigns a normalised rating out of 100 to reviews from mainstream critics, The Menace has an average score of 69 based on 19 reviews, indicating "generally favorable reviews". American critic Robert Christgau considered The Menace a better album than the band's eponymous debut, but acknowledged that its impact would be non-existent.

== Track listing ==
All tracks written by Justine Frischmann, except where noted.

1. "Mad Dog God Dam" – 3:16
2. "Generator" (Frischmann, Paul Jones)– 1:50
3. "How He Wrote Elastica Man" (Frischmann, Mark E. Smith, Julia Nagle) – 2:02
4. "Image Change" (Donna Matthews) – 3:27
5. "Your Arse My Place" – 2:15
6. "Human" (Matthews, Gilbert, Gotobed, Lewis, Newman) – 3:29
7. "Nothing Stays The Same" (Matthews) – 2:44
8. "Miami Nice" – 3:21
9. "Love Like Ours" (Matthews) – 2:22
10. "KB" (Frischmann, Smith, Nagle) – 3:12
11. "My Sex" – 4:10
12. "The Way I Like It" – 2:39
13. "Da Da Da" (Krawinkel, Remmler) – 3:52

== Personnel ==
Elastica

- Justine Frischmann – vocals, guitar, programming, toy keyboard, photography
- Sharon Mew – keyboards, vocals
- Paul Jones – lead guitars
- Annie Holland – bass
- Dave Bush – keyboards, programming
- Justin Welch – drums

Additional musicians

- Donna Matthews – vocals, guitar (tracks 3, 4, 6, 7, 9)
- Mark E. Smith – vocals (tracks 3, 10)
- Sheila Chipperfield – bass (track 4)
- M. Box – bass (track 11)
- Norman Balda – keyboards (track 13)

Technical personnel

- Elastica – performer, arranger, producer
- Marc Waterman – producer
- Alan Moulder – producer (track 4)
- Bruce Lampcov – producer (track 11)
- N. Stuart – photography
- D. Titlow – photography
- Maya Arulpragasam – cover photography
- Steve Lamacq – A&R

== Songs ==
- "Mad Dog God Dam" is the result of Justine Frischmann's first stint at programming on Cubase.
- "Your Arse My Place" is a twisted 12-bar-blues which was made for the sake of a filler at a John Peel's BBC session recording. Its main riff is "borrowed" from Adam and the Ants' "It Doesn't Matter" – a song which, fittingly, was recorded by the Ants for a John Peel session in 1978.
- "The Way I Like It" was written for Damon Albarn.

== Charts ==
Chart (2000)	Peak position
European Albums (Eurotipsheet)	100
Scottish Albums (Official Charts)	50
UK Albums (Official Charts)	24
UK Independent Albums (Official Charts)	3
