= The Radio One Sessions (Elastica album) =

Compilation album by Elastica
- Released: 29 October 2001
- Recorded: 12 August 1993 – 22 September 1999
- Genre: Britpop
- Label: Strange Fruit Records/Koch Records
- Producer: John Peel, Steve Lamacq, Mark Radcliffe, Miti Adhikari, James Birtwistle, Tim Durham, Nick Gomm, Lis Roberts, Mike Robinson

Elastica chronology
The Menace (2000)	The Radio One Sessions (2001)

Professional ratings
Review scores
Source	Rating
AllMusic	4.5/5 stars
The Austin Chronicle	3/5 stars
NME	(7/10)
Rolling Stone	3/5 stars

The Radio One Sessions is a compilation of BBC Radio One sessions recorded by Britpop group Elastica. The album is notable for the appearance of several songs not included on any other Elastica release.

== Track listing ==
1. "Annie" (Donna Matthews) – 1:15
2. "Spastica" (Justine Frischmann) – 2:34
3. "Line Up" (Frischmann) – 3:12
4. "Vaseline" (Frischmann) – 1:20
5. "Brighton Rock" (Frischmann, Elastica) – 1:56
6. "In The City" (Frischmann) – 1:31
7. "Waking Up" (Burnell, Cornwell, Duffy, Frischmann, Greenfield) – 3:17
8. "Four Wheeling" (Car Song) (Frischmann) – 2:26
9. "Hold Me Now" (Matthews) – 2:26
10. "Ba Ba Ba" (Frischmann) – 2:33
11. "All For Gloria" (Traditional) – 3:02
12. "I Wanna Be a King of Orient Aah" (Traditional) – 2:05
13. "Rockunroll" (Frischmann) – 2:14
14. "2:1" (Matthews) – 2:29
15. "I Want You" (Frischmann) – 4:05
16. "Only Human" (Gilbert, Robert Gotobed, Lewis, Matthews, Newman) – 3:24
17. "A Love Like Ours" (Matthews) – 2:27
18. "KB" (Frischmann, Nagle, Smith) – 3:13
19. "Da Da Da" (Kralle Krawinkel, Stephan Remmler) – 3:41
20. "Generator" (Frischmann) – 1:47
21. "Your Arse My Place" (Frischmann) – 1:46

The releases omits 10 tracks recorded by the band for BBC Radio 1, in many cases because they were already present from another session.

1. "Rockunroll" (1993.09.18) Peel Session *previously released as a b-side to Line Up
2. "2:1" (1994.03.16) Evening Session *previously released as a b-side to Stutter
3. "Connection" (1994.03.16) Evening Session *previously released on Evening Session Priority Tunes compilation album.
4. "Never Here" (1994.06.14) Peel Session
5. "Father Christmas" (1994.12.06) Peel Session (unreleased song)
6. "Blue" (1994.12.06) Peel Session
7. "Gloria" (1995.03.28) Radcliffe Session
8. "Car Song" (1995.03.28) Radcliffe Session
9. "The Other Side" (1996.07.10) Evening Session (unreleased song)
10. "Mad Dog" (1999.09.22) Peel Session

== Recording details ==
- Tracks 1–5 recorded for John Peel, 18 September 1993
- Tracks 6–7 recorded for the Evening Session, 16 March 1994
- Tracks 8–10 recorded for John Peel, 14 June 1994
- Tracks 11–12 recorded for John Peel, 6 December 1994
- Tracks 13–14 recorded for Mark Radcliffe, 28 March 1995
- Tracks 15–17 recorded for the Evening Session, 10 July 1996
- Tracks 18–21 recorded for John Peel, 22 September 1999

== Personnel ==
- Miti Adhikari – producer
- James Birtwistle – producer
- Dave Bush – keyboards, programming
- Sheila Chipperfield – bass
- Tim Durham – producer
- Nick Fountain – engineer
- Justine Frischmann – guitar, vocals
- Nick Gomm – producer
- Steve Gullick – photography, inlay photography
- Annie Holland – bass
- Paul Jones – guitar
- Fred Kay – engineer
- Steve Lamacq – liner notes
- Donna Matthews – guitar, backing vocals
- Mew – keyboards, backing vocals
- Lis Roberts – producer
- Andy Rogers – engineer
- Lisa Softley – engineer
- George W. Thomas – engineer
- Justin Welch – drums, voices
- Tony Worthington – engineer
