= Deceptive Fifty =

Compilation album by Various artists
- Released: 1998
- Label: Deceptive

Professional ratings
Review scores
Source	Rating
Uncut	3/5 stars

Deceptive Fifty was a various artists compilation album issued by Deceptive Records to celebrate fifty releases on the label. It was released in 1998.

== Track listing ==
1. "Thundersley Invacar" (by Collapsed Lung)
2. "Stutter" (by Elastica)
3. "Alkaline" (by Scarfo)
4. "Come and Gone" (by Snuff)
5. "I See Red" (by Unun)
6. "Give Me Daughters" (by Jonathan Fire*Eater)
7. "Annihilate Now" (by Idlewild)
8. "Drowning by Numbers" (by Placebo)
9. "Be My Light Be My Guide" (by Gene)
10. "That Good One" (by Meices)
11. "Teenage Girl Crush" (by Angelica)
12. "Mea Culpa Blues (It's My Fault)" (by Colouring Lesson)
13. "Smile It's Sugar" (by Spare Snare)
14. "Shine on Me" (by Prisoners)
15. "On Me Not in Me" (by Earl Brutus and Alan Vega)
16. "Bar Bar Bar" (by Elastica)
17. "Whatever Happened to the Likely Lads (Theme)" (by Snuff)
18. "I Want You" (by Scarfo)
19. "Connection" (by Collapsed Lung)
