= Elastica (album) =

Studio album by Elastica
- Released: 13 March 1995
- Recorded: 1994
- Studio: Konk (London)
- Genres: Britpop; post-punk; power pop
- Length: 38:08
- Labels: Deceptive (UK); DGC (US)
- Producers: Marc Waterman; Elastica

Elastica chronology
Elastica (1995)	6 Track EP (1999)

Singles from Elastica
- 1. "Stutter" Released: 1 November 1993; 2. "Line Up" Released: 31 January 1994; 3. "Connection" Released: 10 October 1994; 4. "Waking Up" Released: 13 February 1995; 5. "Car Song" Released: January 1996 (US)

Elastica is the debut studio album by English alternative rock band Elastica. It was released on 13 March 1995 through Deceptive Records in the UK and DGC/Geffen Records internationally. This is the only album to feature the original line-up, and guitarist Donna Matthews.

Elastica peaked at no. 1 on the UK charts, selling over 100,000 units, and remained in the Top 10 for 5 weeks. The album was nominated for the Mercury Music Prize.

== Production ==
On November 1, 1993, Elastica released their debut single "Stutter" to positive reviews from critics. This was followed up by "Line Up", released in January 1994. In an interview with Andrew Smith from The Guardian from 2002, Frischmann explained her inclination to write very short songs: "I have a low boredom threshold. I want the best bits — verse-chorus, verse-chorus, that's it. The whole thing of playing middle eights and triple choruses to finish isn't music, it's brainwashing. If you want to hear the chorus again, rewind it."

The band then retreated from public view for over a year before releasing their debut album. Frontwoman Justine Frischmann had been the subject of much media scrutiny due to her relationships with Suede singer Brett Anderson and later Blur frontman Damon Albarn. In an interview with magazine Melody Maker, Frischmann stated, "it’s imperative that you should be written about for your music, which is why we decided, after January, we needed to go away and prove ourselves."

Although Elastica was grouped with the Britpop bands of the time, their influences were more oriented towards British punk and New York new wave acts from the '70s, such as Wire, New Order, Buzzcocks, Talking Heads, Brian Eno, Happy Mondays and Blondie, instead of '60s acts like The Beatles and The Kinks. "It was irritating to be lumped in with Oasis. None of us liked their music. I remember being confused when I first heard them – it sounded like classic-rock power ballads," recalled Frischmann to Kathryn Bromwich from The Guardian in 2015.

The lyrics in Elastica discuss chaotic youthful lifestyles and relationships — groupies, sex, pub crawls, cars, authenticity, fame and a desire for connection are some of the topics covered by Frischmann and Matthews. The most famous song from the album, "Connection", is intentionally vague about whether the subject is selling out for success in romantic relationships or in the music industry.

== Reception ==
Professional ratings
Initial reviews (in 1995)
Review scores
Source	Rating
Entertainment Weekly	B+
The Guardian	4/4 stars
NME	9/10
Q	4/5 stars
Rolling Stone	4/5 stars
Smash Hits	4/5 stars
Spin	9/10
The Village Voice	A−

Professional ratings
Retrospective reviews (after 1995)
Review scores
Source	Rating
AllMusic	4.5/5 stars
Pitchfork	8.5/10
The Rolling Stone Album Guide	4.5/5 stars

Elastica was well-received critically. The Los Angeles Times opined that "the smart, sassy savagings of losers and poseurs are a refreshing advance from grunge's gloomy self-absorption." The Independent concluded that "it is, yes, new new wave, and sometimes too close to old new wave: 'Vaseline' is Blondie and 'Waking Up' the Stranglers." Select ranked the album at number 9 in its list of the "50 albums of the year". In the U.S., the album was ranked as the sixth best album of the year by Mike Boehm in the Los Angeles Times, and the album was also highly rated by Rolling Stone, Spin and The Village Voice.

In their retrospective review, AllMusic praised the album, writing "what makes Elastica such an intoxicating record is not only the way the 16 songs speed by in 40 minutes, but that they're nearly all classics" and that "hardly any new wave band made records this consistently rocking and melodic". BBC Music wrote "As albums that fall off a genre's radar go, Elastica's eponymous debut ranks high", calling it "a neglected gem" and the "blueprint for what Britpop should sound like".

=== Plagiarism allegations ===
Elastica were sued by Wire on the charge of stealing from "I Am The Fly" (1978) for the opening track "Line Up". They were also accused of lifting and transposing the guitar riff on "Connection" from Wire's "Three Girl Rhumba" (1977). The band was also sued by The Stranglers, who claimed that Elastica's single "Waking Up" borrowed heavily from "No More Heroes" (1977).

Both lawsuits were settled out of court.

== Commercial performance ==
Elastica hit number one on the UK Albums Chart, becoming, at the time, the fastest-selling debut since Oasis' Definitely Maybe the previous year. The record also did well in the US, climbing to a peak of number 66 on the Billboard 200 after 11 weeks on the chart. Two months after its release, it had sold over 59,000 units in the US according to Nielsen Soundscan. By the end of 1995 it had sold approximately 1 million copies worldwide according to Billboard. Around half of these sales were in America where it was certified as gold in December 1995. By April 2000, sales in the UK were estimated by the band's Deceptive label at 270,000 copies.

== Legacy ==
In 2013, NME called it the 191st greatest album of all time. The album is included in the book 1001 Albums You Must Hear Before You Die. In 2014, American LGBT magazine Metro Weekly ranked the album at number 38 in its list of the "50 Best Alternative Albums of the 90s". In 2017, Pitchfork listed the album at number six in its list "The 50 Best Britpop Albums".

== Track listing ==
Original version
No.	Title	Writer(s)	Length
1.	"Line Up"	Frischmann, Elastica	3:15
2.	"Annie"	Matthews, Jane Oliver, Elastica	1:15
3.	"Connection"	Frischmann, Elastica	2:22
4.	"Car Song"	Frischmann, Elastica	2:24
5.	"Smile"	Frischmann, Matthews, Elastica	1:40
6.	"Hold Me Now"	Frischmann, Matthews, Elastica	2:33
7.	"S.O.F.T."	Frischmann, Elastica	3:59
8.	"Indian Song"	Frischmann, Elastica	2:48
9.	"Blue"	Matthews, Elastica	2:23
10.	"All-Nighter"	Frischmann, Elastica	1:31
11.	"Waking Up"	The Stranglers, Frischmann, Elastica	3:16
12.	"2:1"	Matthews, Elastica	2:31
13.	"Vaseline"	Frischmann, Elastica	1:20
14.	"Never Here"	Frischmann, Elastica	4:27
15.	"Stutter"	Frischmann, Elastica	2:23

US version
No.	Title	Writer(s)	Length
1.	"Line Up"	Frischmann, Elastica	3:15
2.	"Annie"	Matthews, Jane Oliver, Elastica	1:15
3.	"Connection"	Frischmann, Elastica	2:22
4.	"Car Song"	Frischmann, Elastica	2:24
5.	"Smile"	Frischmann, Matthews, Elastica	1:40
6.	"Hold Me Now"	Frischmann, Matthews, Elastica	2:33
7.	"S.O.F.T."	Frischmann, Elastica	3:59
8.	"Indian Song"	Frischmann, Elastica	2:48
9.	"Blue"	Matthews, Elastica	2:23
10.	"All-Nighter"	Frischmann, Elastica	1:31
11.	"Waking Up"	The Stranglers, Frischmann, Elastica	3:16
12.	"2:1"	Matthews, Elastica	2:31
13.	"See That Animal"	Brett Anderson, Frischmann, Elastica	2:23
14.	"Stutter"	Frischmann, Elastica	2:23
15.	"Never Here"	Frischmann, Elastica	4:27
16.	"Vaseline"	Frischmann, Elastica	1:20

== Personnel ==
Elastica

- Justine Frischmann – vocals, guitar
- Donna Matthews – vocals, guitar
- Annie Holland – bass guitar
- Justin Welch – drums

Additional personnel

- Dan Abnormal (Damon Albarn) – Additional keyboards on tracks 3, 4, 8 & 11

Production

- Marc Waterman – production, engineering, mixing
- Phil Vinall – mixing
- Alan Moulder – mixing
- Paul Tipler – mixing
- Bruce Lampcov – mixing
- John Leckie – mixing
- Mitti – mixing
- Juergen Teller – album photography
- Steve Lamacq – A&R
- Mark Kates – A&R

== Charts ==
=== Weekly charts ===
Chart (1995)	Peak position
New Zealand Albums (RMNZ)	20
Scottish Albums (Official Charts)	1
Swedish Albums (Sverigetopplistan)	34
UK Albums (Official Charts)	1
European Albums (Eurotipsheet)	12
US Billboard 200	66
Australia (ARIA Charts)	57
Canada Top Albums/CDs (RPM)	33

=== 2026 deluxe edition ===
Chart (2026)	Peak position
Scottish Albums (Official Charts)	32
UK Album Sales Chart (OCC)	19
UK Independent Albums (Official Charts)	8

=== Year-end charts ===
Chart (1995)	Position
UK Albums (OCC)	51

== Certifications ==
Region	Certification	Certified units/sales
Canada (Music Canada)	Gold	50,000^{^}
United Kingdom (BPI)	Gold	100,000^{^}
United States (RIAA)	Gold	500,000^{^}
^{^} Shipments figures based on certification alone.
