= Elastica 6 Track EP =

6 Track EP

EP by Elastica
- Released: 23 August 1999
- Recorded: 1996–1999
- Genre: Britpop
- Label: Deceptive Records
- Producer: Bruce Lampcov, Alan Moulder

Elastica chronology
Elastica (1995)	6 Track EP (1999)	The Menace (2000)

Professional ratings
Review scores
Source	Rating
AllMusic	3/5 stars
The New Rolling Stone Album Guide	2/5 stars

When released in 1999, Elastica's 6 Track EP was the first new material issued by the band since the B-Sides from the Car Song single from 1996 . According to bandleader Justine Frischmann the EP represented more of a document of what the band was up to during the interim rather than a return to form: "The material has been chosen to allow people to hear rarities and demos which reflect all stages of the bands recording between 1996 and 1999. The EP is certainly not intended to be some big comeback record." Indeed, several of the songs would later find themselves on their second album The Menace (2000) although in more polished form.

Mark E. Smith duets with Frischmann on "How He Wrote Elastica Man."

== Track listing ==
1. "How He Wrote Elastica Man" (Julia Nagle, Mark E. Smith) – 2:02
2. "Nothing Stays the Same" (Donna's Home Demo) (Matthews) – 2:37
3. "Miami Nice" (Home Recording) (Elastica, Hardy) – 3:22
4. "KB" (Elastica) – 3:12
5. "Operate" (Live) (Matthews) – 3:25
6. "Generator" (Elastica) – 1:51

== Personnel ==
Elastica

- Justine Frischmann – vocals, guitar
- Donna Matthews – guitar, vocals
- Annie Holland – bass
- Justin Welch – drums
- Paul Jones – lead guitar
- Mew – keyboards, vocals
- Dave Bush – keyboards, loops
