= Hanging Around =

Hanging Around or similar titles may refer to:

- Hanging Around (film), a 1996 film by Damien Hirst
- Hangin'-A-Round, the 2006–07 FIRST Vex Challenge game

== Songs ==
- "Hangin' Around" (Big Brovaz song), 2006
- "Hanging Around" (The Cardigans song), 1999
- "Hanging Around" (Gemma Hayes song), 2002
- "Hanging Around" (The Stranglers song), 1977
- "Hanginaround", a 1999 song by Counting Crows
- "Hanging Around", by Basement from Promise Everything
- "Hanging Around", by Me Me Me
- "Hanging Around", by Mood Six
- "Hanging Around", by The Spencer Davis Group from Living in a Back Street
- "Hangin' Around", by Trudy Richards
- "Hangin' Around", written by Ted Varnivk and Nick Acquaviva
- "Hangin' Around", by the Edgar Winter Group from They Only Come Out at Night
- "Hanging Around", by Charli XCX from Sucker
