= Holly Ross =

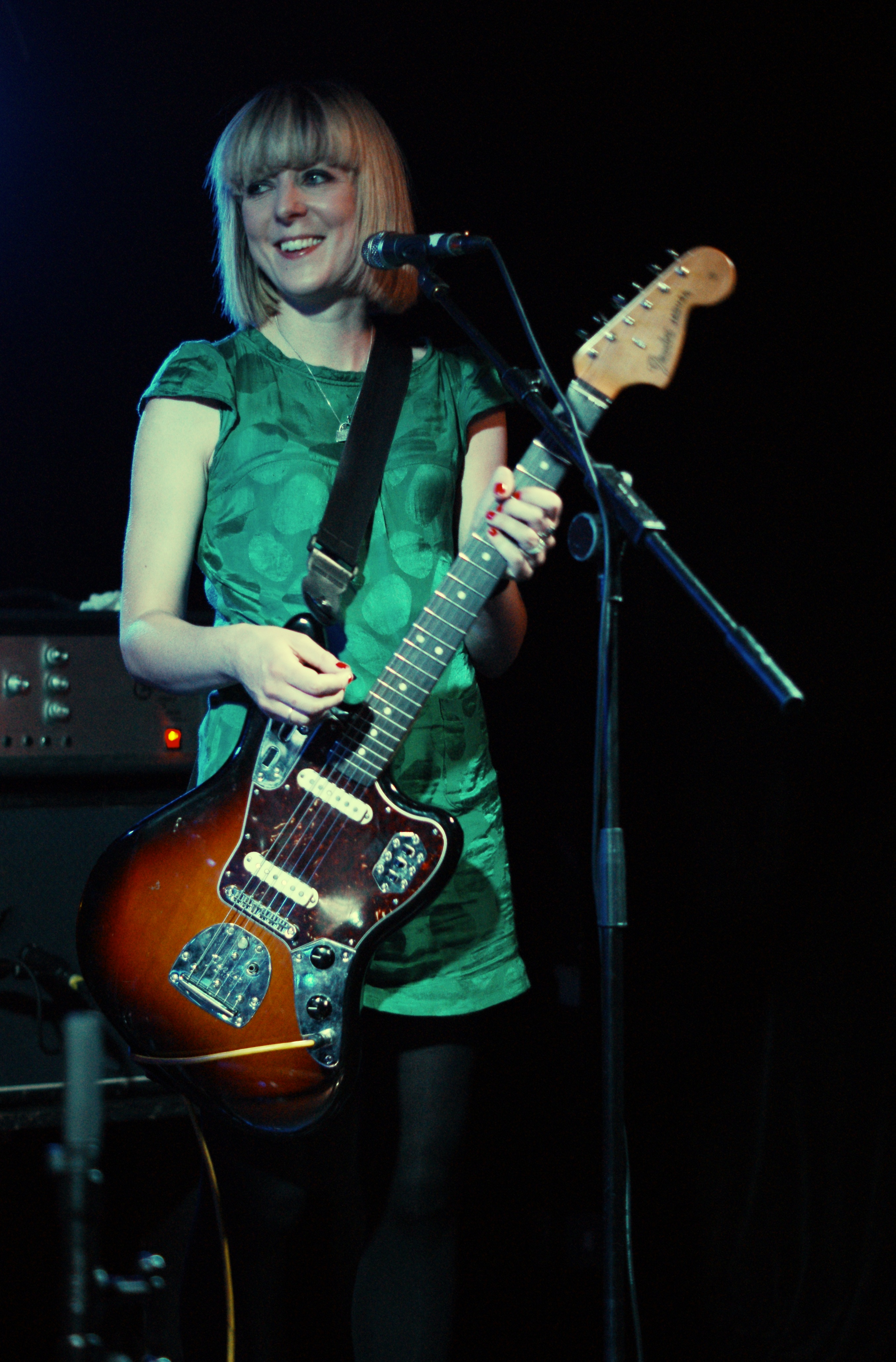
- Holly Ross with The Lovely Eggs at the Night and Day Cafe, Manchester, 2011.

Background information
- Origin: Lancaster, England
- Genres: Indie rock Art rock
- Instrument(s): Guitars vocals
- Years active: 1994–present

Holly Ross is a musician from Lancaster, England. She was the guitarist and lead vocalist of the band Angelica from 1994 to 2003. She became the lead performer for The Lovely Eggs from 2006. Her singing has been described as "soft as butter Lancastrian tones."

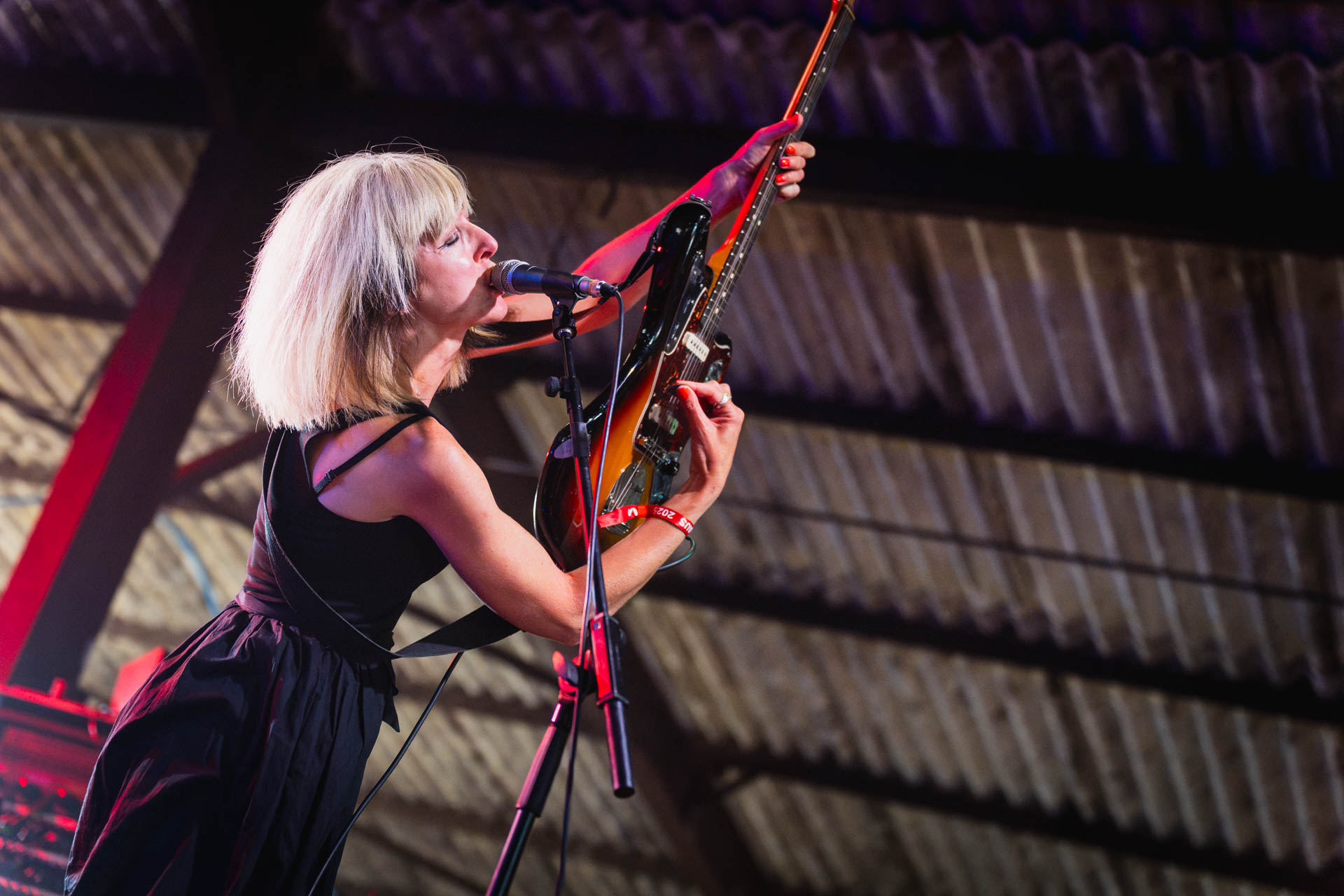
Holly Ross leading The Lovely Eggs at Krankenhaus at Muncaster Castle in August 2025 - photo by Paul Hudson

== Discography ==
=== Albums ===
- The End of a Beautiful Career (2000) (Mini-Album)
- The Seven Year Itch (2002)

=== Singles ===
- "Teenage Girl Crush" (1997)
- "Why Did You Let My Kitten Die?" (1999)
- "Bring Back Her Head" (1999)
- "Take Me I'm Your Disease" (2000)

=== Compilation albums ===
- Deceptive Fifty (1998)
- Ladyfest UK 2001 (2001)
- Ladyfest UK 2003 (2003)
