= Waking Up (Elastica song) =

1995 single by Elastica

Single by Elastica

from the album Elastica
- B-side: "Gloria"
- Released: 13 February 1995
- Genre: Britpop
- Length: 3:16
- Label: Deceptive
- Songwriters: Justine Frischmann, Elastica, the Stranglers
- Producer: Elastica

Elastica singles chronology
"Connection" (1994)	"Waking Up" (1995)	"Car Song" (1996)

"Waking Up" is a song by Britpop group Elastica. It was released as a single in February 1995 and reached number 13 on the UK Singles Chart. It preceded the release of their self-titled debut album, which came out the following month.

The song, written about being an underachiever, received positive critical reviews. However, it also prompted a lawsuit from the publishers of the Stranglers, who claimed that Elastica took the song's riff from the Stranglers' "No More Heroes". The case was settled out of court after Elastica agreed to co-credit the Stranglers as writers on all future releases of the song.

== Background ==
"Waking Up" is a song about being an underachiever, in which writer-vocalist Justine Frischmann "exorcises her personal malaise" with the lines: "I'd work very hard but I'm lazy/I've got a lot of songs but they're all in my head/I'll get a guitar and a lover who pays me/If I can't be a star I won't get out of bed." Damon Albarn contributed keyboards to the song.

The single was released on 13 February 1995 with the B-side "Gloria". "Waking Up" was included as the 11th track on Elastica's 1995 self-titled album, and an alternate version was included on 2001's The Radio One Sessions.

=== Controversy ===
Elastica were sued for plagiarism by the publishers of the Stranglers, Complete Music, who claimed that "Waking Up" resembled one of the Stranglers' songs, "No More Heroes". The case was settled out of court before Elastica's album was released. Elastica agreed to pay Complete Music 40 per cent of the royalties from the album, and the Stranglers were also given a co-writing credit on the song.

One of the members of the Stranglers, JJ Burnel, later said, "Yes, it sounds like us, but so what? Of course there's plagiarism, but unless you live in a vacuum there's always going to be. It's the first thing our publishers have done for us in 20 years, but if it had been up to me, I wouldn't have bothered." Another member of the Stranglers, Jet Black, even thanked Elastica in Melody Maker for bringing attention to his old band.

== Reception ==
=== Critical reception ===
"Waking Up" received positive reviews from music critics. Louise Gray called it "magnificent". Stephen Thomas Erlewine of AllMusic wrote that the song "rework[ed] the Stranglers' "No More Heroes" into a more universal anthem that loses none of its punkiness". In his review of the single, Jack Rabid wrote that "Waking Up" is a "great song" that "sounds like Wire covering the Stranglers, with a sharp female singer." Music & Media wrote: "The A-track is not only loud but definitely a song too, stretchable to more than just the alternative format."

=== Chart performance ===
The song debuted on the UK Singles Chart at number 13 on 19 February 1995. "Waking Up" stayed on the chart for four weeks in total.

== Music video ==
The promotional music video for "Waking Up" features two different performances by the band. In both, the band members are wearing black clothing, and in one of the performances, they are surrounded by naked men sitting on the ground.

== Track listings ==
7-inch

1. "Waking Up"
2. "Gloria"

CD single

1. "Waking Up"
2. "Gloria"
3. "Car Wash"
4. "Brighton Rock"

== Charts ==
=== Weekly charts ===
Chart (1995)	Peak position
Israel (IBA)	36
Scotland Singles (Official Charts)	18
UK Singles (Official Charts)	13
UK Indie (Music Week)	1
