= Tonight You Are the Special One =

Studio album by Earl Brutus
- Released: June 1998
- Studio: Earl Brutus' studio in Wembley
- Genres: Art rock; glam rock; electronic
- Length: 48:36
- Label: Fruition
- Producer: Earl Brutus

Earl Brutus chronology
Your Majesty... We Are Here (1996)	Tonight You Are the Special One (1998)

Singles from Tonight You Are the Special One
- 1. "The SAS and the Glam That Goes with It" Released: September 1997; 2. "Come Taste My Mind" Released: February 1998; 3. "Universal Plan" Released: May 1998

Tonight You Are the Special One is the second and final album by British band Earl Brutus, released in 1998 as their only album for Fruition Recordings, a subsidiary of Island Records. Following the critical success but commercial failure of the group's previous album Your Majesty... We Are Here (1996), Earl Brutus spent a year recording Tonight in their Wembley studio. Though the band self-produced most of the material, a couple of songs were co-produced by others such as Dave Ball and William Reid. The album continues the band's aggressive sound, mixing glam rock and electronic influences and incorporating the group's distinctive "post-pub" lyrical style.

The album cover was designed by Scott King and depicts two cars feeding each other exhaust fumes via a hose in a visual metaphor for corporate suicide. Promoted by a national tour and the singles "The SAS and the Glam That Goes with It", "Come Taste My Mind" and "Universal Plan", the latter two of which charted on the UK Singles Chart, Tonight You Are the Special One was another critical success but commercial disappointment for Earl Brutus, who subsequently split up. As the group rose in stature in the years following their dissolution, Tonight You Are the Special One was re-released alongside the group's debut in 2016 by Loop 3 Music in a new remastered version containing bonus material.

== Background and recording ==
Earl Brutus were formed in 1993 by Nick Sanderson, formerly of World of Twist, and became known for their distinctive sound, which fused glam rock and electronic music, and their lyrics which were described by Mark Deming of AllMusic as "obsessively male, darkly witty, powerfully stylish, obsessed with alcohol and British life, and laced with subtly transgressive detail." Having signed to Deceptive Records, the group had settled into a line up of Sanderson, vocalist Jamie Fry, guitarist Rob Marche and keyboardist Gordon King by the time of their debut album, Your Majesty... We Are Here (1996), which received much press attention but was commercially unsuccessful. The band subsequently left Deceptive, which was struggling financially, and signed to Fruition Records, a subsidiary of Island Records, for their next album.

Earl Brutus spent a year recording Tonight You Are the Special One in their own Wembley studio with Dave Ball of The Grid. The group produced the entire album alone, except for "The SAS and the Glam That Goes with It," which was produced by Ball and Ingo Vauk, and "Male Wife," produced by Ben Lurie, Dick Meaney and William Reid. By now, the group were working daily. King recalled: "We tried to make a job of it and there was a good working dynamic, particularly when we were writing the second album." While recording the record, the group added long-term fan Shinyu as a live member. His role was of an obtuse, non-musical nature, drinking lager onstage and making announcements like "Can I have a steak and kidney pie, please", "Japanese man shouting rubbish" and "Nick someone's drink and cause a fight." Far ahead of the album's release, "The SAS and the Glam That Goes With It" was issued as a single in October 1997, and in January 1998, the group cemented their standing as an energetic live act at the NME Brat Awards.

== Composition ==
"People fuckin' need us because we're the ultimate scary, exciting pop band. In my book music worth listening to is when you think the singer might be a fuckin' mass murderer or something. All pop bands should be like that."

— Nick Sanderson, 1998

Tonight You Are the Special One continues Earl Brutus' aggressive, abrasive style, blending glam rock and electronic influences. Writer David Stubbs wrote that, as with the band's previous album, the record "[splashes] hectically somewhere between stomp-rock and electropop." Journalist Doug Brod similarly considered both albums to be "unclassifiable (not to mention certifiable)". According to writer Roy Wilkinson of Select, the album displays a witty "audio portrait of post-pub '90s Britain," highlighting influences of glam rock and The Fall and contrasting lyrics about television chefs and Tudorbethan mansions. Tobias Jones of The Independent described the group's sound as "thrash with lippy socio-vocals, like early Blur with a testosterone injection."

"The SAS and the Glam That Goes with It" and "Come Taste My Mind" are propulsive techno pop songs allegedly intoned by "pub-managing ex-'70s footballers." The lyrics of the former song, which is Northern in tone, incorporate Shinyu's onstage comment "Nick someone's drink and cause a fight," and are based around the refrain "You are your own reaction." The latter song, meanwhile, opens with a heavy drumbeat and was described by Select as falling slightly short "of Sham 69 territory." The electronic track "God Let Me Be Kind" was inspired by Kraftwerk. "Universal Plan" displays the band's retrospective side, with its effective lyrics "I get up, go to work, eat my lunch, come home, cure cancer, that’s it. It’s a beautiful world." "Second Class War" and "Midland Road" begin with a church organ and stuttering electronic beat, respectively, before both shifting towards big guitar riffs. Earl Brutus interpolate the guitar riffs of the Osmonds' "Crazy Horses" into "Second Class War" and Hawkwind's "Silver Machine" into "Male Wife", the latter of which closes the album in a chaotic fashion.

== Artwork ==
The album cover was designed by Scott King and depicts a set of BMW and SUV cars parked besides each other, passing exhaust fumes into one another via a long hose in a visual metaphor for what King called a "yuppie suicide pact." Sanderson described the image as depicting 'corporate suicide', commenting: "You walk around London and you see all these bloody off-road great big four-wheel drive things, and all they bloody do is go from bloody Twickenham to the city. So we liked the idea of a corporate suicide pact – it's quite upbeat really. Doing everyone a favour." After the album's vinyl reissue, Radio X ranked the album cover at number 45 in their list of "The Top 50 Vinyl Album Cover Sleeves of 2016."

Scott King also designed the artwork for the album's singles. The sleeve of "The SAS and the Glam That Goes with It" features a photograph of a woman from Skipton with a moustache. The band picked the photo due to its direct yet odd style and "cartoon" nature. The "Come Taste My Mind" sleeve features a man in a bra. Jamie Fry had wanted to use a different Scott King photograph of a tin of soup, but a marketer at Island refused. Compromise was reached when the label instead placed similar tins of soup on counters in record shops across Britain as a means of promotion. As part of his Britlins exhibition, Scott King created the post-postmodern installation piece You Are Your Own Reaction (2018), referencing a line from Earl Brutus' "The SAS and the Glam That Goes with It".

== Release and reception ==
Professional ratings
Review scores
Source	Rating
God Is in the TV	5/5 stars
The List	4/5 stars
LouderSound	8/10
Select	3/5 stars

Released in June 1998 to coincide with Earl Brutus' national tour, Tonight You Are the Special One was the band's second album and sole album for Fruition Recordings. The group became victims of label upheaval upon the record's release, and as with its predecessor, it proved commercially unsuccessful and failed to chart. On the UK Singles Chart, "Come Taste My Mind", which featured a remix by Jamie Reid on the B-side, peaked at number 80 in February 1998, and "Universal Plan", which was released in May to coincide with the album and tour, reached number 91 the following month. Despite its poor sales, Tonight You Are the Special One received critical acclaim. Roy Wilkinson of Select felt that the band were able to "capture more of Britain than most bands manage in their whole careers." Though commenting that the group should be as admired for their presence as their recordings, he concluded that "the Brutus should be cherished by all." The magazine later ranked it at number 28 in their list of the year's best albums. Fiona Shepherd of The List praised the album's glam rock riffs, intense rhythms and provocative vocals, and felt that Earl Brutus' "total lack of self-consciousness about their glam racket, influences and appearances" was comparable to Rocket from the Crypt.

The group followed the album with the 1999 single "Larky", which became their final release. They performed sporadically for several years after before splitting in 2004. In the years that followed, the group became reappraised by some as one of the era's great 'lost' bands. The group featured in Spin magazine's 2009 list of "Unsung: The 100 Greatest Bands You've (Probably) Never Heard", where writer Doug Brod highlighted Tonight You Are the Special One as "Essential Listening". On 15 January 2016, remastered reissues of both Earl Brutus albums were released by Loop 3 Music. The Tonight reissue was available as a vinyl – marking the first time it was released on the format – and as a double CD featuring bonus material and extensive liner notes. Among the bonus tracks is "Superstar", which was made available on SoundCloud to promote the reissue. Marrying March's dub echo loops and Sanderson's heavy drums and Timpani percussion, it was recorded in only several hours and described by Fry as a "lost Brutus classic".

In a review of the remastered edition, Jonathan Wright of God Is in the TV wrote that the album "does not let up for a second," praising the humour, emotion and anger in the songs, "sometimes all at once," and hailing it as the band's "second perfect album in a row." Writing for Louder Than War, Ioan Humphreys highlighted the "riffs, attitude and theatricals" and felt the record's abrasive, confrontational style would "drag and suck you in to [the band's] nasty plan." He commented: "It feels very sad that these tracks are lying here waiting to be either discovered, or ignored again." Reviewing the reissue for Louder Sound, author David Stubbs commented that "The SAS and the Glam That Goes with It" exemplifies "the sort of essential waste product that the north is great at and the south can’t quite get its head around."

== Track listing ==
All songs written by Earl Brutus

1. "The SAS and the Glam That Goes with It" – 3:38
2. "Universal Plan" – 4:31
3. "Midland Red" – 4:10
4. "God, Let Me Be Kind" – 3:44
5. "Come Taste My Mind" – 4:11
6. "Second Class War" – 4:27
7. "Your Majesty We Are Here" – 3:59
8. "Don't Die Jim" – 4:16
9. "99P" – 3:37
10. "East" – 4:39
11. "Edelweiss" – 4:24
12. "Male Wife" – 2:54

=== Remastered bonus disc ===
The double-disc remastered edition names the first disc Piss and the bonus disc Off.

1. "Nicotine Stain" (Live)
2. "Superstar"
3. "Larky"
4. "TV Tower"
5. "William, Taste My Mind" (William Reid Remix)
6. "Gypsy Camp Battle"
7. "The Scottish"
8. "Teenage Opera"
9. "Come Taste My Mind" (Live at the Astoria 1998)
10. "Nice Man in a Bubble"
11. "England Sandwich"
12. "Teenage Taliban" (Demo/Live from Hammersmith Working Man's Club, 7 April 2004)

== Personnel ==
Adapted from the liner notes of Tonight You Are the Special One

- Earl Brutus – writing, production
- David Ball – production (track 1)
- Ingo Vauk – production (track 1)
- Ben Lurie – production (track 12)
- Dick Meaney – production (track 12)
- William Reid – production (track 12)
- Scott King – design
