= Scarfo (disambiguation) =

Scarfo is a former UK rock band.

Scarfo may also refer to:

- Nicky Scarfo Jr. (born 1965), American mobster, son of Nicodemo
- Nicodemo Scarfo (1929-2017), American mobster, father of Nicky, Jr.
- Scarfo Crime Family
