= Line Up (song) =

Single by Elastica

from the album Elastica
- B-side: "Vaseline"
- Released: 31 January 1994
- Recorded: 1994
- Genre: Punk rock
- Length: 3:15
- Label: Deceptive Records
- Songwriter: Justine Frischmann
- Producer: Elastica

Elastica singles chronology
| "Stutter" (1994) | "Line Up" (1994) | "Connection" (1994) |

"Line Up" is a song by English rock band Elastica released as a single on 31 January 1994, and later released on their eponymous debut album in 1995. It spent three weeks on the UK Singles Chart, peaking at No. 20 on 12 February 1994.

== Track listing ==
=== UK CD & 12" single ===
1. "Line Up"
2. "Vaseline" (Demo Version)
3. "Rockunroll" (Peel Session)
4. "Annie" (Peel Session)

=== AUS CD single ===
1. "Line Up"
2. "Gloria"
3. "Car Wash"
4. "Brighton Rock"

== Soundtrack appearances ==
The song appears on the soundtrack to the 1995 film Mallrats. It also appeared in Not Another Teen Movie.

== Charts ==
| Chart (1994) | Peak position |
|---|---|
| UK Singles (OCC) | 20 |
| UK Indie (Music Week) | 1 |
