= Dreamspaces =

- Title card
- Genre: Architectural documentary
- Presented by: David Adjaye; Justine Frischmann; Charlie Luxton
- Country of origin: United Kingdom
- Original language: English
- No. of series: 2
- No. of episodes: 15

Original release
- Network: BBC Three
- Release: 16 February 2003 – 5 February 2004

Dreamspaces is a BBC documentary TV series about architecture and interior design. The programme ran for two series and had twelve episodes total. The show was broadcast on BBC Three from 2003 to 2004.

The presenters of Dreamspaces were David Adjaye, Justine Frischmann and Charlie Luxton.

== Episodes ==
=== Series 1 (2003) ===
Episode	Segments	Presented by	Description
1	Bag It Up	Charlie Luxton	
1	Destination: Puerto Rico	Justine Frischmann	
1	Pocket Guide: Mies van der Rohe	Charlie Luxton	
1	Well Overdue	David Adjaye	
1	Dreamspace: Dave Gorman	Dave Gorman	
2	Urban Choice	Charlie Luxton	
2	Destination: Bucharest	David Adjaye	
2	Pocket Guide: Arne Jacobsen	Charlie Luxton	
2	A River Runs through It	Justine Frischmann	
2	Dreamspace: Pauline McLynn	Pauline McLynn	
3	Tainted Love	Justine Frischmann	
3	Destination: Miami	Charlie Luxton	
3	Pocket Guide: Walter Gropius	Charlie Luxton	
3	All Rise	David Adjaye	
3	Dreamspace: Jamie Theakston	Jamie Theakston	
4	Destination: Antwerp	David Adjaye	
4	Nuclear Families	Justine Frischmann	
4	Pocket Guide: Denys Lasdun	Charlie Luxton	
4	Park Life	Charlie Luxton	
4	Dreamspace: Natalie Casey	Natalie Casey	
5	Clubbed to Death	David Adjaye	
5	Destination: Brasilia	Justine Frischmann	
5	Pocket Guide: James Stirling	Charlie Luxton	
5	The Ambassador's Reception	Charlie Luxton	
5	Dreamspace: Nick Moran	Nick Moran	
6	Destination: Helsinki	Charlie Luxton	
6	Power Trip	David Adjaye	
6	Pocket Guide: le Corbusier	Charlie Luxton	
6	Watercooler Challenge	Justine Frischmann	
6	Dreamspace: Mark Radcliffe	Mark Radcliffe	

=== Series 2 (2004) ===
Episode	Segments	Presented by	Description
1	Destination: Mexico City		Justine Frischmann explores spas, viewing Nicholas Grimshaw's new work in Bath and Peter Zumthor's offering in the Swiss Alps, while Charlie Luxton visits Federation Square in Melbourne and EastEnders' Jessie Wallace studies her favourite piece of architecture, the art deco Hoover building in west London. David Adajaye also asks whether the Tricorn Centre in Portsmouth and London's Hayward Gallery should be restored or demolished
2			Charlie Luxton explores modern architecture in Mexico City and Justine Frischmann profiles Richard Neutra, who was responsible for designing many Hollywood homes during the 1930s and 1940s. DJ Seb Fontaine reveals why Paris's Charles De Gaulle is his favourite airport, and David Adjaye considers the trend for unusual building shapes, including Norman Foster's Swiss Re building in London and the Yokohama Ferry Terminal in Japan
3	Shop And Awe		Justine Frischmann visits architect John Pawson in his Zen-style minimalist home, and checks out the new trend of maximalism, which is all about being brightly coloured, busy and over-the-top. Meanwhile, Charlie Luxton questions whether supermarkets can ever be more than just big, bland, ugly boxes, while David Adjaye travels to Japan's most creative city, Fukuoka
4	Just Can't Bet Enough		Justine Frischmann discovers the real Casablanca and David Adjaye visits Manchester, London and Birmingham, seeking out the best in department store designs as Selfridges set out to revamp their old-fashioned image. Charlie Luxton explores parliament and assembly buildings in Berlin and major UK cities, while Dawson's Creek star Joshua Jackson discusses the Walt Disney Concert Hall in Los Angeles
5	Dreamspace: Innsbruck		Charlie Luxton visits Las Vegas to investigate how the right casino design can encourage customers to part with their cash and Justine Frischmann finds out why one of the most prestigious prizes in architecture was recently awarded to Archigram, a group of Sixties hippies who never built anything. David Adjaye heads for Valencia and actress and comedian Doon Mackichan talks about her favourite building, the Hudson Hotel in New York
6			Justine Frischmann visits Innsbruck in Austria to see Zaha Hadid's modern ski jump and Dominique Perrault's city centre complex, and Charlie Luxton reports on examples of architecture that can be camouflaged in Australia, the south of France and Japan. David Adjaye explores members-only clubs that are trying to move away from their old-fashioned image, while fanatical Arsenal supporter Paul Kaye explains why he believes Highbury Stadium is the country's classiest football ground

== About the Presenters ==
=== David Adjaye ===
David Adjaye is a graduate of the Royal College of Art. Having started a small practice in 1994, he soon built a reputation in reconstructing cafes, bars and private homes for high-profile clients, including Chris Ofili, Ewan McGregor and Alexander McQueen. His practice Adjaye/Associates has designed two 'Idea Store' libraries in the London Borough of Tower Hamlets, and the Bernie Grant Centre in Tottenham, along with a range of other commissions.

=== Justine Frischmann ===
Justine Frischmann received her BSc in architecture from the Bartlett in 1990. She then went on to lead the band Elastica in the mid-to-late-nineties, before studying and pursuing art. She was a judge for the 2003 Royal Institute of British Architecture's Stirling Prize.

=== Charlie Luxton ===
Charlie Luxton has lived in England since 1983 and has an MA in architecture from Oxford Brookes University. He was the creative director of Make Communications, a company producing architecture, events and television. In November 2003 Make opened a new "urban experience" on London's South Bank involving giant wind turbines. In 2004 he presented a series Guerilla Homes. As well as presenting on BBC Three, Charlie has been seen on BBC Four, Channel 4 and Five.
