= Stutter (Elastica song) =

Single by Elastica

from the album Elastica
- B-side: "Pussycat"
- Released: 1 November 1993 (UK); 20 September 1994 (US)
- Recorded: June 1993
- Genre: Britpop; pop-punk; punk rock
- Length: 2:21
- Label: Deceptive
- Songwriters: Justine Frischmann; Elastica
- Producer: Elastica

Elastica singles chronology
"Stutter" (1993)	"Line Up" (1994)

Audio sample
- file; help

"Stutter" is the debut single by the Britpop group Elastica and was written by lead singer Justine Frischmann. It was originally released as a single in the UK in November 1993 and in the US in September 1994. The song was later included on the band's 1995 self-titled debut album. The single, which received positive reviews from critics, charted in the US and Canada.

== Background ==
"Stutter" was written by Elastica's lead singer, Justine Frischmann. The song is a little over two minutes long and contains just two verses and two choruses because Frischmann thought that any more would be unnecessary. The lyrics are about "the occasional problem of drunken male impotence."

== Release ==
"Stutter" was first released in November 1993 for the independent Deceptive label. It was released initially as a 7" only and sold out within one day. Although it was a limited edition of only 1,500 pressings, the single generated enormous media exposure for the band: based solely on the strength of it, Elastica was voted Best New Band in the year's-end Readers Poll in Melody Maker. To avoid overexposure, the song was deliberately not worked into North American radio until later in 1995, after which it charted in both the US and Canada.

"Stutter" was included as the 14th track on Elastica's 1995 self-titled debut album, and it was also included on the 2002 20th Century Masters collection, Best of Brit Pop.

=== Critical reception ===
The song received positive reviews from music critics. Spin wrote that "[The single] Stutter delivers four brilliant pop songs". In a review of the band’s self-titled album, Douglas Wolk of CMJ New Music Monthly wrote: "Elastica's best moments are all on its own, especially the astonishing single 'Stutter'".

Writing for Billboard, Larry Flick included "Stutter" in his Critic's Choice list, writing: "It may be a stretch, but this indie quartet is best described as a better-natured Hole. Both acts feature sassy fronting females, impatient melodies, and gritty guitar riffs. The energetic tone here, however, is uplifting-not brooding. Equally interesting is the flip side, 'Pussycat'." In 2012, NME ranked the song at number 53 in its list of the "100 Best Tracks of the Nineties".

=== Chart performance ===
The single peaked at No. 80 in the UK in November 1993. In the US, "Stutter" stayed on the Billboard Hot 100 chart for nine weeks, peaking at No. 67 on 26 August 1995. It also went to No. 82 on the Cash Box Top 100 and No. 10 on the Billboard Alternative Songs chart on 12 August. In Canada, the song peaked at No. 4 on the Alternative chart on 14 August.

== Music video ==
The song's music video, which was directed by David Mould, was filmed in San Francisco, California and aired regularly on MTV in 1995. It features the band members playfully meandering from Grant Avenue in Chinatown to the Broadway stretch of strip clubs and other adult businesses.

== Track list ==
UK 7"

1. "Stutter"
2. "Pussycat"

US CD single

1. "Stutter"
2. "Rockunroll" (Peel Session)
3. "2:1" (Evening Session)
4. "Annie" (Peel Session)

== Charts ==
Chart (1993)	Peak position
UK Singles (OCC)	80

Chart (1995)	Peak position
Australia (ARIA)	125
Canada Alternative Rock (RPM)	4
US Billboard Hot 100	67
US Alternative Airplay (Billboard)	10
US Cash Box Top 100	82
