= Car Song (Elastica song) =

Single by Elastica

from the album Elastica
- Released: January 1996
- Recorded: 1994
- Genre: Britpop, alternative rock
- Length: 2:25
- Label: Geffen Records
- Songwriters: Justine Frischmann, Elastica
- Producer: Elastica

Elastica singles chronology
"Waking Up" (1995)	"Car Song" (1996)	"How He Wrote Elastica Man" (1999)

"Car Song" is a song by the Britpop group Elastica. It was originally released in 1995 on the band's self-titled debut album. It was released as a single in North America and Australia in January 1996 but was never issued in the UK.

The song received positive reviews from critics. It peaked at #33 on the US Alternative Songs chart and at #14 on the Canadian alternative chart.

== Background ==
"Car Song" was written by Elastica's lead singer, Justine Frischmann. The song is about having sex in a car.

== Release ==
"Car Song" was first released on Elastica's self-titled debut album on 14 March 1995. Its five-track CD single was released in 1996 by Geffen Records. Another version of the song, titled "Four Wheeling", was included on Elastica's compilation album, Elastica Radio One Sessions.

=== Critical reception ===
"Car Song" received generally positive reviews from music critics. According to Stephen Thomas Erlewine, the song "makes sex in a car actually sound sexy". Entertainment Weekly's Chuck Eddy wrote that "Justine Frischmann's awkward sex-in-a-Ford-Fiesta forwardness ("Car Song") can charm your pants off."

=== Chart performance ===
In the US, the single spent three weeks on the Alternative Songs chart and peaked at #33 on 23 December 1995. It also spent nine weeks on the Canadian alternative chart, peaking at #14 there.

== In popular media ==
"Car Song" was included on an episode of Gilmore Girls in addition to appearing on the show's soundtrack Our Little Corner of the World: Music from Gilmore Girls. The song was also featured in TV show Hindsight.

== Music video ==
The song's music video, directed by Spike Jonze, has been described as a "futuristic thriller combining elements of Blade Runner and Japanese monster films".

== Track list ==
CD single

1. "Car Song" [LP Version]
2. "Car Song" (Live)
3. "Bar Bar Bar" (Demo)
4. "Jam" [II] (Live)
5. "Gloria" (Live)

== Charts ==
Chart	Peak position
Australian Singles Chart	106
Canadian Alternative Rock	14
US Alternative Songs	33
