= Angelica (band) =

English punk rock band (1994–2003)

- Origin: Lancaster, Lancashire, England, UK
- Genres: Punk rock, indie pop, punk pop, riot grrrl
- Years active: 1994–2003
- Labels: Deceptive, Fantastic Plastic, Victory Works
- Past members: Holly Ross; Brigit Colton; Claire Windsor; Rachel Parsons

Angelica were an English all-girl punk rock band from Lancaster, Lancashire, England. Holly Ross (lead vocals and guitar), Brigit Colton (bass guitar), Claire Windsor (guitar) and Rachel Parsons (drums) formed the band while still at school in 1994 and performed until 2003. Their music was influenced by punk music mixed with surf rock overtones, and features feminist lyrics.

== Career ==
Beginning with their first single, "Teenage Girl Crush" on the independent label Deceptive Records in 1997, they were regulars on the independent music scene, making numerous appearances on BBC Radio 1's Evening Session and the legendary John Peel show as well as supporting The Beautiful South at the Galpharm Stadium (formerly McAlpine Stadium) in Huddersfield. After disagreements with Deceptive Records management, they switched labels to Fantastic Plastic. In August 1999, their "Why Did You Let My Kitten Die?" single was voted Alternative Record of the Year by the Evening Session audience. Their follow-up single in November 1999, "Bring Back Her Head", peaked at No 8 in the Indie Charts. The band finished the year with a Peel Session and a showcase set on Lamacq Live. In January 2000, Angelica played at the NME Premier Awards with Ash and Muse. In April 2000, their mini-albumThe End of a Beautiful Career, recorded in Matrix Studios London and produced by Paul Tipler, reached No 4 in the Indie Chart. In August 2000, the band played at the Reading and Leeds Festivals, and their single "Take Me I'm Your Disease" was playlisted by XFM and entered the Indie chart at No 1.

In 2002, the band appeared on the UK Ladyfest Tour. Their sole full-length album, The Seven Year Itch, was produced by Kat Bjelland of Babes in Toyland and Katastrophy Wife and Gavin Monaghan. Angelica ended the year by headlining the Lancaster Music Co-op benefit weekend. The band played in September 2002 at the Lancaster venue, The Yorkshire House. At some point after this performance, the band split, however they remain good friends.

Brigit Colton and Rachel Parsons appeared with Lancastrian band The Adventures of Loki from 2003 to 2010. Brigit Colton (now Brigit McWade) is now playing with TV FACE. Holly Ross is now playing with The Lovely Eggs.

== Members ==
- Holly Ross - lead vocals, guitar
- Claire Windsor - guitars
- Brigit Colton - vocals, bass guitar
- Rachel Parsons - drums and percussion

== Discography ==
Albums:

- The End of a Beautiful Career (2000) (Mini-Album)
- The Seven Year Itch (2002)

Singles:

- "Teenage Girl Crush" (1997)
- "Why Did You Let My Kitten Die?" (1999)
- "Bring Back Her Head" (1999)
- "Take Me I'm Your Disease" (2000)

Compilation appearances:

- Deceptive Fifty (1998)
- Ladyfest UK 2001 (2001)
- Ladyfest UK 2003 (2003)

== See also ==
- All-women band
