= Connection (Elastica song) =

1994 single by Elastica

Single by Elastica

from the album Elastica
- B-side: "See That Animal"; "Blue" (Donna's 4-track demo); "Spastica"
- Released: 10 October 1994
- Genre: Britpop; post-punk; art punk
- Length: 2:21
- Label: Deceptive; Geffen
- Songwriter: Justine Frischmann
- Producer: Elastica

Elastica singles chronology
"Line Up" (1994)	"Connection" (1994)	"Waking Up" (1995)

"Connection" is a song by Britpop group Elastica. It was originally released on 10 October 1994 as a single and included on their self-titled debut album in 1995. The song debuted and peaked at number 17 on the UK Singles Chart and became one of the few Britpop songs to gain popularity in North America, reaching numbers 48 and 53 on the US Cash Box Top 100 and Billboard Hot 100, number two on the Billboard Modern Rock Tracks chart, and number nine on the Canadian RPM 100 Hit Tracks chart. In an interview with Zane Lowe, Damon Albarn mentions playing the synthesizer intro on a Yamaha QY10 handheld sequencer.

The song was the subject of controversy due to its overt similarity to another band's work. The intro synthesizer part (later repeated as a guitar figure) is lifted from the guitar riff in Wire's "Three Girl Rhumba" and transposed down a semitone. A judgment resulted in an out-of-court settlement and the credits were rewritten. Jonathan Perry writing for The Phoenix noted the similarities to Wire. He included the song in a list of the 90 best songs of the 90s, writing: "'Connection', Elastica's obsessively catchy stateside breakthrough, nicked its signature opening riff from Wire's 'Three Girl Rhumba' – an overzealous (and uncredited) 'homage' that proved that though imitation may indeed be the highest form of flattery, it can also cost in publishing royalties. Great song, though."

== Reception ==
Pitchfork said, "Elastica crafted one of the marvels of the Britpop era: art-rock reconfigured as a carnal rallying cry. All leftward hooks and innuendo, "Connection" never hits its target squarely. The single sounds simple, even primal, as Elastica bashes their dive-bomb riff with enthusiasm." AllMusic's Stephen Thomas Erlewine observes that on its release, "Connection" was criticized "for taking the keyboard riff from Wire's "Three Girl Rhumba," though he also notes that "Elastica can make the rigid artiness of Wire into a rocking, sexy single with more hooks than anything on Pink Flag."

== Track listings ==
UK CD and 12-inch single

1. "Connection"
2. "See That Animal"
3. "Blue" (Donna's 4-track demo)
4. "Spastica"

UK cassette and limited-edition 7-inch single

1. "Connection"
2. "See That Animal"

European and Australian CD single

1. "Connection"
2. "Rockunroll" (John Peel Session)
3. "Annie" (John Peel Session)
4. "See That Animal"

== Charts ==
=== Weekly charts ===
Chart (1994–1995)	Peak position
Australia (ARIA)	71
Canada Top Singles (RPM)	9
Canada Rock/Alternative (RPM)	11
Europe (Eurochart Hot 100)	65
Scottish Singles Sales (Official Charts)	25
UK Singles (Official Charts)	17
UK Airplay (Music Week)	30
US Billboard Hot 100	53
US Album Rock Tracks (Billboard)	40
US Modern Rock Tracks (Billboard)	2
US Cash Box Top 100	48

=== Year-end charts ===
Chart (1995)	Position
Canada Top Singles (RPM)	98
US Modern Rock Tracks (Billboard)	13

== Release history ==
Region	Date	Format(s)	Label(s)	Ref.
United Kingdom	10 October 1994	7-inch vinyl; 12-inch vinyl; CD; cassette	Deceptive	
Australia	20 February 1995	CD	Geffen	
United States	18 April 1995	Contemporary hit radio	Geffen	

== Usage in media ==
The song was used in the opening credit sequence of the 2023 biographical comedy BlackBerry, playing over a montage depicting the history of mobile phone technology. Later that year, it was used in the horror film Five Nights at Freddy's, during a sequence in which the characters build a fort. It is the final credits song in the 2022 movie Kimi and it also appears in the 2019 movie Captain Marvel, which takes place largely in 1995. The song was used as the opening/closing theme of the TV show Trigger Happy TV.
