= Me Me Me (band) =

English Britpop supergroup in 1996

- Origin: London, England
- Genres: Britpop
- Years active: 1996
- Labels: Indolent
- Past members: Stephen Duffy; Alex James; Justin Welch; Charlie Bloor

Me Me Me were a one-off English Britpop supergroup formed in 1996, consisting of Alex James of Blur (vocals, bass), Stephen Duffy (vocals, guitar) previously of Duran Duran/The Lilac Time, Justin Welch of Elastica (drums), and James' friend Charlie Bloor (credited as "musician"). The band's first and only single, "Hanging Around" was released on 5 August 1996 and reached number 19 on the UK Singles Chart.

"Hanging Around" was released on 7-inch single (DUFF005) and cassette (DUFF005C), also featuring "Hollywood Wives", and on CD-single with a third track, "Tabitha's Island" (DUFF005CD). There were also promotional versions released in July 1996 on 12-inch single (DOLE041) and CD-single (DOLE044). The tracks were originally recorded as a soundtrack for Damien Hirst's film Hanging Around, first shown at the Spellbound Exhibition, which took place at London's Hayward Gallery in March 1996.

The lead track was produced by the band. The other tracks were produced by Stephen Street.

== Discography ==
=== Singles ===
Date	Single	Type	Track listing
5 August 1996	"Hanging Around"	CD	1. "Hanging Around"; 2. "Hollywood Wives"; 3. "Tabitha's Island"
5 August 1996	"Hanging Around"	CD promo	1. "Hanging Around"; 2. "Hollywood Wives"; 3. "Tabitha's Island"
5 August 1996	"Hanging Around"	Cassette	1. "Hanging Around"; 2. "Hollywood Wives"
5 August 1996	"Hanging Around"	7"	1. "Hanging Around"; 2. "Hollywood Wives"
5 August 1996	"Hanging Around"	12" promo	1. "Hanging Around"; 2. "Tabitha's Island"
