= Donna Matthews =

Welsh musician

Donna Lorraine Matthews (born 2 December 1971) is a Welsh musician who was the lead guitarist of the Britpop band Elastica.

== Music career ==
When she was 20, Matthews answered an advert in Melody Maker for a guitarist with a new band. She became a member of Elastica, subsequently becoming one of their songwriters and credited for many of their tracks. Matthews left Elastica in the spring of 1999 after the band's output had waned and she had developed a heroin habit. In April 2000 she briefly rejoined the band to play one track, "Connection", at the London Kentish Town Forum after being invited out of the audience by Elastica singer Justine Frischmann.

After shaking off her drug addiction she formed an unnamed band with bassist Isabel Waidner and Catrin Jones. In May 2003 they produced and sold 1000 copies of a single, called "L.O.V.E."

In May 2004, Matthews' new band, Klang (with Waidner and drummer Keisuke Hiratsuka) released their debut album, No Sound is Heard. Klang have not produced any output or news since 2005.

On 21 January 2017 three-quarters of the original line-up of Elastica – Matthews, Annie Holland and Justin Welch – worked together on the remastering of Elastica.

As of 2022, Matthews has a YouTube channel where she uploads mostly improvisational music.

== Other activities ==
In 1998, Matthews played the role of glam rocker Polly Small in the film Velvet Goldmine. Matthews and Teenage Fanclub also covered the New York Dolls song, Personality Crisis for the soundtrack.

At some point in the early 2000s, Matthews became a dedicated Christian and went on to study music at the Dartington College of Arts in Devon. Interviewed in 2007 by Artisan magazine, she claimed she was still making music but no longer had a desire to be in the public eye, wanting simply to be "rich in love". After spending some time working as a pastor in Totnes, by 2016 she had become a missionary working with the homeless.
