= The Pre New =

English electronic band

The Pre New are an English electronic band formed in 2010 in London, England. The group is notable for including former members of both World of Twist and Earl Brutus.

== History ==
The Pre New was initially formed to pay tribute to Nick Sanderson of Earl Brutus and Tony Ogden of World of Twist by headlining the Queens Head Stage at Glastonbury Festival 2010. The Pre New then formed as a unit in their own right and in 2012 released their debut album Music for People Who Hate Themselves. Later that year, the band performed at Shoreditch's The 1-2-3-4 Festival while their track "I, Rockstar" was included in the festival's accompanying compilation of tracks by underground and "inspirational international" artists.

In 2013, the group released a remix album titled Music for Homeowners - which featured mixes by Mogwai, Public Service Broadcasting, Saint Etienne and other special guests - whilst they toured the UK. During the making of this album, the band held a remix contest for the track "Cathedral City Comedown" which was won by Netherman, a songwriter from Ohio, USA.

In May 2015, the band released their second studio album The Male Eunuch on CD, vinyl, download and as a downloadable PowerPoint file. A limited edition box set was also made available containing all four formats along with a signed art print and "unique Pre New memorabilia". The group promoted the album by playing a handful of shows around the UK (including a few supporting The Fall and Saint Etienne) and appearing on Marc Riley's show for BBC6 Music where they performed three tracks from the album.

The Male Eunuch received widespread critical acclaim from the music press with The Guardian making it their 'Album of the Week'. Following the album's release, a video for the track "Janet vs John" (taken from the PowerPoint version of the album) was released via YouTube.

== Musical style ==
Perhaps due to the presence of Stuart Boreman, Gordon King and Jamie Fry, the group's sound bares some similarities to Earl Brutus however, contributions from the group's more recent members (namely Stuart Wheldon Vinny Gibson and Laurence Bray) ensure that The Pre New have a sound that remains contemporary. The group's music references glam rock, acid house, EBM, synthpop, punk rock and nu-disco as well as visual artists including Jeff Koons (from whom the band gets its name) and Jeremy Deller.

== Discography ==
=== Studio albums ===
- Music for People Who Hate Themselves (2012)
- Music for Homeowners (2013)
- The Male Eunuch (2015)
