= The Seven Year Itch (Angelica album) =

Studio album by Angelica
- Released: April 22, 2002
- Recorded: Magic Garden
- Genre: Punk rock
- Length: 31:59
- Label: Victory Works
- Producer: Kat Bjelland, Gavin Monaghan

Angelica chronology
The End of a Beautiful Career (2000)	The Seven Year Itch (2002)

Professional ratings
Review scores
Source	Rating
Drowned in Sound	9/10 link

The Seven Year Itch is the first full-length album by Angelica released on Victory Works records. It was produced by Kat Bjelland of Babes in Toyland and Katastrophy Wife who also sang guest vocals on "Golden Lillies".

== Track listing ==
1. "I Want A Piece Of The Action" – 3:32 (Colton)
2. "Misdemeanour" – 2:36 (Colton, Ross)
3. "Liberation Is Wasted On Me" – 3:29 (Ross)
4. "Evergreen" – 4:04 (Ross)
5. "Reynard The Fox" – 3:21 (Angelica)
6. "Golden Lillies" – 0:51 (Colton)
7. "The Apple, The Book" – 3:23 (Colton)
8. "Guilty As Sin" – 2:39 (Colton)
9. "Your Religion Is Me" – 4:18 (Angelica)
10. "Rosemary Call The Goddess" – 3:41 (Angelica)
