= This Is Eggland =

Studio album by The Lovely Eggs
- Released: 23 February 2018
- Length: 38:28
- Label: Egg

The Lovely Eggs chronology
This Is Our Nowhere (2015)	This Is Eggland (2018)	I Am Moron (2020)

Professional ratings
Aggregate scores
Source	Rating
Metacritic	72/100
Review scores
Source	Rating
Drowned in Sound	9/10
musicOMH	3/5 stars
Pitchfork	7.0/10

This Is Eggland is the fifth studio album by English punk rock band The Lovely Eggs. It was released in February 2018 under Egg Records.

== Critical reception ==
This Is Eggland was met with "generally favourable" reviews from critics. At Metacritic, which assigns a weighted average rating out of 100 to reviews from mainstream publications, this release received an average score of 72, based on 12 reviews.

=== Accolades ===
Publication	Accolade	Rank	Ref.
Louder Than War	Top 78 Albums of 2018	8	
MusicOMH	Top 50 Albums of 2018	34	

== Track listing ==
No.	Title	Length
1.	"Hello I Am Your Sun"	3:12
2.	"Wiggy Giggy"	5:22
3.	"Dickhead"	2:22
4.	"I Shouldn't Have Said That"	2:12
5.	"Return of the Witchcraft"	3:58
6.	"I'm With You"	4:11
7.	"Repeat It"	2:25
8.	"Witchcraft"	3:13
9.	"Big Sea"	4:23
10.	"Let Me Observe"	4:43
11.	"Would You Fuck!"	2:27

== Charts ==
Chart performance for This Is Eggland
Chart (2018)	Peak position
UK Independent Albums (OCC)	9
