= List of Ladyfest Festivals =

This is a list of all known Ladyfest festivals worldwide.

== 2024 ==
- Ladyfest Budapest (Hungary), 31 August–1 September

== 2020 ==
- Ladyfest Oslo (Oslo, Norway) – 8 March

== 2019 ==
- Ladyfest Oslo (Oslo, Norway) – 8 March & 2 June
- LadyFest: a \'kwirdo/(m) edition, Maastricht – 4–5 May
- LaDIY*fest #2, Strasbourg (France) – 30–31 August, 1 September

== 2018 ==
- Ladyfest Shanghai (China) – 24 March & 10 June
- LadyFest Binghamton (New York) – 6–7 April
- LadyFest Maastricht – 5/6 May
- LadyFest Budapest (Hungary) – 6–8 July
- LaDIY*fest Strasbourg (France) – 30 August–2 September
- Ladyfest Montreal (Canada) – 3–9 September
- LadyFest Lexington (Kentucky) – 22 September

== 2017 ==
- Lady*fest Tallinn – 8 to 12 March
- Ladyfest Shanghai (China) – 11 March & 10 June
- LadyFest Maastricht – 6 and 7 May
- LaDIYfest Leipzig – 19 to 21 May
- Lady*fest Heidelberg – 15 to 18 June
- Ladyfest Budapest – 17 to 18 June 2017
- Lady*fest Karlsruhe – 26 to 27 August 2017
- Ladyfest Montreal – 4 to 10 September 2017
- LaDIYfest Freiburg – 13 to 15 October 2017

== 2016 ==
- Ladyfest Shanghai (Shanghai, China) – 4–5 March 2016
- Ladyfest Oslo (Oslo, Norway) – 6–8 March 2016
- Ladyfest Tallinn (Tallinn, Estonia) – 8–12 March 2016
- Ladyfest Brussels (Forest, Brussels, Belgium) – 18–20 March 2016
- Ladyfest Barcelona (Barcelona, Spain) – 23–26 June 2016
- Ladyfest Montreal (Montreal, Quebec, Canada) – 12–18 September 2016
- Ladyfest Manchester (Manchester, United Kingdom) 7–9 October 2016
- Ladyfest New Orleans (New Orleans, Louisiana, USA) – 29 October–November 6, 2016

== 2015 ==
- Ladyfest Lehigh Valley (LeHigh Valley, Pennsylvania, USA) – 15–30 January 2015
- Ladyfest (Kalamazoo, Michigan, USA) – March 2015
- Ladyfest Tallinn (Tallinn, Estonia) – 3–7 March 2015
- Ladyfest Shanghai (Shanghai, China) – 7 March 2015
- Ladyfest Oslo (Oslo, Norway) – 7–8 March 2015
- Ladyfest Atlanta (Atlanta, Georgia, USA) – 20–22 March 2015
- Ladyfest Ukraine (Kyiv, Ukraine) – 4–6 April 2015
- Ladyfest Baltimore (Baltimore, USA) – 29 May – 1 June 2015
- Ladyfest Kassel (Kassel, Germany) – 31 July, – 2 August 2015
- Ladyfest Dayton (Dayton, Ohio, USA) – 28–29 August 2015
- Ladyfest Rostock (Rostock, Germany) – 9–13 September 2015
- Ladyfest Miami (Miami, Florida, USA) – 25–26 September 2015
- Ladyfest New Orleans (New Orleans, Louisiana, USA) – 31 October–November 8, 2015
- Ladyfest Manchester (Manchester, United Kingdom) – 14 November 2015

== 2014 ==
- GrrlFest Melbourne (Melbourne, Australia) – 11 January 2014
- Ladyfest Shanghai (Shanghai, China) – 8 March 2014. First Ladyfest in mainland China.
- Ladyfest Brussels (Forest, Brussels, Belgium) – 14–16 March 2014
- Ladyfest Erie (Erie, Pennsylvania, USA) – 12 April 2014
- Ladyfest Milano (Milan, Italy) – 6–8 June 2014
- Ladyfest Miami (Miami, Florida, USA) – 19–20 September 2014
- Ladyfest New Orleans (New Orleans, Louisiana, USA) – 5–9 November 2014

== 2013 ==
- GrrlFest Melbourne (Melbourne, Australia) – 10 January 2013
- Ladyfest London (London, Ontario, Canada) – June 2013
- Ladyfest Madrid (Madrid, Spain) – 20–23 June 2013
- Ladyfest Bay Area (San Francisco, CA, USA) – September 2013
- Ladyfest New Orleans (New Orleans, Louisiana, USA) – 7–10 November 2013

== 2012 ==
- Ladyfest Oslo (Oslo, Norway) – 8 March
- "F-Word" Ladyfest (Florida State University, Tallahassee, FL, USA) – 14 April 2012
- Ladyfest London (London, Ontario, Canada) – June 2012
- Ladyfest Mainz (Mainz, Germany) – 13–15 July 2012
- Ladyfest Providence (Pawtucket, RI, USA) – 21–23 September 2012
- Ladyfest Frosinone (Frosinone, Lazio, Italy) – 29 September–5 October 2012
- Ladyfest New Orleans (New Orleans, Louisiana, USA) – 7–11 November 2012
- Ladyfest Zagreb/"Vox Feminae" (Zagreb, Croatia) – 21–24 Nov 2012

== 2011 ==
- Ladyfest Bellingham (Bellingham, WA, USA) – 15–19 June 2011
- Ladyfest London (London, Ontario, Canada) – June 2011
- Ladyfest Oslo (Oslo, Norway) – 3 September
- Ladyfest New Orleans (New Orleans, Louisiana, USA) – 3–6 November 2011
- "Vox Feminae" Ladyfest Zagreb (Zagreb, Croatia) – 3–8 Nov 2011

== 2010 ==
- Ladyfest Oslo (Oslo, Norway) – 8 March (plus 11 May, 27 Sep, 29 Nov)
- Ladyfest Bellingham (Bellingham, WA, USA) – 17–20 June 2010
- Ladyfest London (London, Ontario, Canada) – June 2010
- "Vox Feminae" Ladyfest Zagreb (Zagreb, Croatia) – 16–19 Sep 2010
- Ladyfest New Orleans (New Orleans, Louisiana, USA) – 7–11 November 2010

== 2009 ==
- Ladyfesta Bilbao (Bilbao, Spain) – 26 June 2009
- Ladyfest Bellingham (Bellingham, WA, USA) – June 2009
- "Vox Feminae" Ladyfest Zagreb (Zagreb, Croatia) – 30 Sep–Oct 4, 2009
- Ladyfest New Orleans (New Orleans, Louisiana, USA) – 4–8 November 2009
- Ladyfest Wellington (Wellington, New Zealand) 3–5 Dec 2009

== 2008 ==
- Ladyfesta Bilbao (Bilbao, Spain) – 20 June & 19 Dec 2008
- Ladyfest New Orleans (New Orleans, Louisiana, USA) – 15–19 October 2008
- "Vox Feminae" Ladyfest Zagreb (Zagreb, Croatia) – 28 Nov 2008

== 2007 ==
- "Vox Feminae" Ladyfest Zagreb (Zagreb, Croatia) – 12–14 Oct 2007
- Ladyfest New Orleans (New Orleans, Louisiana, USA) – 14–18 November 2007
- Ladyfest Romania (Bucharest, Romania) – 12–14 October 2007
- Ladyfest Turku (Turku, Finland) – 17–19 May 2007
- Ladyfest Wien (Wien, Vienna, Austria) – 16–20 May 2007
- Ladyfesta Bilbao (Bilbao, Spain) – 9 March & 9 November 2007

== 2006 ==
- Ladyfest Monterrey (Monterrey, Mexico) – February 2006
- Ladyfest Winnipeg (Winnipeg, Manitoba, Canada) – 24–28 May 2006
- Ladyfest South (Atlanta, GA, USA) – Fall 2006
- Ladyfest Newcastle (Newcastle upon Tyne, UK) 22–24 September 2006
- Ladyfest Toulouse (Toulouse, France) – September/October 2006
- Ladyfest New Orleans (New Orleans, Louisiana, USA) – November 2006
- Ladyfest Wellington (Wellington, New Zealand) 1–2 Dec 2006
- Ladyfest Frankfurt/main (Frankfurt/Main, Germany) – 2006 (email tba)
- Ladyfest Las Vegas (Las Vegas, Nevada, USA) – 2006
- Ladyfest Peninsular (Mérida, Yucatàn, Mexico) – 2006

== 2005 ==
- Ladyfest Ekinda (Santa Maria Capua Vetere, Italy) – 9 January 2005
- Ladyfest Mexico (Monterrey, Mexico) – 12–13 February, La Casa de Pancho Villa Address: Calle Padre Mier No. 837 Pte. Centro
- Ladyfest Hawaii (Honolulu, HI, USA) – 3–6 March 2005
- Ladyfest Brasil (Brazil) – 12–13 March 2005
- Ladyfest Lansing (Lansing, MI, USA) – 14–17 April
- Ladyfest Arcata (Humboldt County, CA, USA) – April 2005?
- Ladyfest Romania (Timișoara, Romania) 20–22 May 2005
- Ladyfest Buffalo (Buffalo, NY, USA) – Summer 2005
- Ladyfest Dresden (Dresden, Germany) – 7–10 July 2005
- Ladyfest San Diego (San Diego, CA, USA) – 14–17 July 2005
- Ladyfest Italia (Napoli, Italy) – 21–23 July 2005
- Ladyfest Olympia – (Olympia, WA, USA) – 28–31 July 2005
- Ladyfest South Africa (Johannesburg, South Africa) – 29 July 2005
- Ladyfest Out West (Denver, CO, USA) – 5–7 August 2005
- Ladyfest Berlin (Berlin, Germany) – 5–13 August 2005
- Ladyfest Brisbane (Brisbane, Australia) – 8–11 September 2005
- Ladyfest Ottawa (Ottawa, Canada) – 15–18 September 2005
- Ladyfest Guelph (Guelph, Canada) – 23–24 September 2005
- Ladyfest Singapore (Singapore) – September 2005
- Ladyfest Switzerland (Zurich, Switzerland) – September 2005
- Ladyfest Ohio (Columbus, OH, USA) – 7–9 October 2005
- Ladyfest Wien/Vienna (Wien, Vienna, Austria) 7–9 October 2005
- Ladyfest East (New York, NY, USA) – 14–16 October 2005
- Ladyfest Mannheim (Mannheim, Germany) – 14–16 October 2005
- Ladyfest Brighton (Brighton, UK) – 19–23 October 2005
- Ladyfest North Carolina (Durham, NC, USA) – 21–23 October 2005
- Ladyfest Spain (Madrid, Spain) – 28–29 October 2005
- Ladyfest Gothenburg (Gothenburg, Sweden) – 3 November 2005
- Ladyfest Malmö (Malmö, Sweden) – 4 November 2005
- Ladyfest Stockholm (Stockholm, Sweden) – 5 November 2005
- Ladyfest Warsaw (Warsaw, Poland) – 9–11 Dec 2005
- Ladyfest Bielefeld (Bielefeld, Germany) – dates tba
- Little Ladyfest (Philadelphia, PA, USA) – Date?
- Ladyfest North Carolina – Date ?

== 2004 ==
- Ladyfest Trier – (Trier, Germany) – 17 January 2004
- Ladyfest Luxembourg – (Luxembourg) – 6 March 2004
- Ladyfest Brazil – (São Paulo, Brazil) – 13–14 March 2004
- Ladyfest Lansing (Lansing, MI, USA) – 15–18 April 2004
- Ladyfest Richmond (Richmond, VA, USA) – 30 April–May 2, 2004
- Ladyfest Sweden Stockholm 30 April 2004 / Malmö 1 May 2004
- Ladyfest Texas (Austin, TX, USA) – 27–30 May 2004
- Ladyfest Ohio (Columbus, OH, USA) – 28–31 May 2004
- Ladyfest Guelph (Guelph, Canada) – 29 May 2004
- Ladyfest Guelph (University of Guelph, Ontario) – 29 May 2004
- Ladyfest Vienna (Vienna, Austria) – 10–13 June 2004
- Ladyfest Seattle (Seattle, WA, USA) – 24–27 June 2004
- Ladyfest Birmingham (Birmingham, UK) – 9–11 July 2004
- Ladyfest Bay Area (San Francisco, CA, USA) – 30 July–August 1, 2004
- Ladyfest Berlin (Berlin, Germany) – 1–15 August 2004
- Ladyfest Denmark (Denmark) – 10–11 September 2004
- Ladyfest Ottawa (Ottawa, Canada) – 17–19 September 2004
- Ladyfest Biblebelt (Denton, TX, USA) – 30 September–October 3, 2004
- Ladyfest Toronto (Toronto, Canada) – 1–3 October 2004
- Ladyfest Wien/Vienna (Wien, Vienna, Austria) – 6–13 Oct 2004
- Ladyfest Leipzig (Leipzig, Germany) – 22–23 October 2004
- Ladyfest Stuttgart-ESSLINGEN (Stuttgart and Esslingen, Germany) – 29–31 October 2004
- Ladyfest East (NYC) – 29 October – 1 November 2004
- Ladyfest South #2 – (Atlanta, GA, USA) – 4–7 Nov 2004
- Ladyfest Dublin – (Dublin, Ireland) – 12–14 November 2004
- Ladyfest Warsaw – (Warsaw, Poland) – 12–14 November 2004
- Ladyfest Adelaide – (Adelaide, Australia) – 1–8 December

== 2003 ==
- Ladyfest Florida (FL, USA) – 6–9 March 2003
- Ladyfest Philly (Philadelphia, PA, USA) – 20–23 March 2003 (list)
- Ladyfest Seattle (Seattle, WA, USA) – 26–30 March 2003
- Ladyfest Lansing (Lansing, MI, USA) – 10–13 April 2003 (email)
- Ladyfest Jakarta (Jakarta, Indonesia) – 16 April 2003
- Ladyfest Devon (Devon, UK) – 25–27 April 2003
- Ladyfest Texas (Austin, TX, USA) – 23–25 May 2003 (email – list)
- Ladyfest Manchester (Manchester, UK) – Summer 2003 (list)
- Ladyfest Out West (Denver, CO, USA) – 18–22 June 2003 (list)
- Ladyfest Bristol (Bristol, UK) – 11–17 August 2003 (list)
- Ladyfest Berlin (Berlin, Germany) – 15 August 2003
- Ladyfest Leipzig (Leipzig, Germany) – 16 August 2003
- Ladyfest Amsterdam (Amsterdam, Netherlands) – 27–31 August 2003
- Ladyfest Hamburg (Hamburg, Germany) – 4–7 September 2003
- Ladyfest Liege (Liège, Belgium) – 3–4 October 2003
- Ladyfest Halifax (Nova Scotia, Canada) – 3–5 October 2003
- Ladyfest Nantes (Nantes, France?) – 9–11 October 2003
- Ladyfest Melbourne (Melbourne, Australia) – 20–23 November 2003
- Ladyfest Auckland (Auckland, New Zealand) – 27–30 November 2003
- Ladyfest Lansing (Lansing, MI, USA) – date??
- Ladyfest Orange County (Orange County, CA, USA) – Date?
- Ladyfest Ottawa (Ottawa, Canada) – date??

== 2002 ==
- Ladyfest Lansing (Lansing, MI, USA) – 11–14 April 2002
- Ladyfest Belgium – 20 July 2002
- Ladyfest Ottawa (Ottawa, Canada) – 12–14 July 2002
- Ladyfest Bay Area (SF/Bay Area, CA, USA) – 24–28 July 2002
- Ladyfest Amsterdam – 26–28 July
- Ladyfest London – 1–4 August 2002
- Ladyfest D.C. (Washington, D.C., USA) – 7–11 August 2002
- Ladyfest Toronto (Toronto, Canada) – 8 September 2002
- Ladyfest East (#2!) (Brooklyn, NY, USA) – 19–22 September 2002
- Ladyfest Orlando (Orlando, FL, USA) – 29 September 2002
- Ladyfest South (Atlanta, GA, USA) – 10–13 October 2002 (list)
- Ladyfest Los Angeles (Los Angeles, CA, USA) – 8–11 November 2002

== 2001 ==
- Ladyfest Indiana (Bloomington, IN, USA) – 5–8 April 2001
- Ladyfest Toronto (Toronto, ON) – 12–14 April 2001
- Ladyfest Scotland (Glasgow) – 12–14 August 2001
- Ladyfest Midwest (Chicago, IL, USA) – 16–19 August 2001
- Ladyfest East Hampton (Easthampton, MA, USA) – 24–25 August 2001
- Ladyfest East (New York City, NY, USA) – 2001

== 2000 ==
- Ladyfest (Olympia, WA, USA) 1–6 August 2000
