= Have You Ever Heard The Lovely Eggs? =

Have You Ever Heard The Lovely Eggs? (EP)

EP by The Lovely Eggs
- Released: October 20, 2008 (Europe)
- Recorded: 2008
- Genre: Indie
- Length: 16:31
- Label: Cherryade Records
- Producer: David Blackwell

The Lovely Eggs chronology
I Like Birds but I Like Other Animals Too (2008)	Have You Ever Heard The Lovely Eggs? (EP) (2008)

Professional ratings
Review scores
Source	Rating
Losing Today	link

Have You Ever Heard The Lovely Eggs? EP is an EP by Lancaster-based band The Lovely Eggs. Released on October 20, 2008 throughout the UK, it was the band's first release on label Cherryade Records.

== Track listing ==
1. "Have You Ever Heard a Digital Accordion?" – 2:17
2. "I Collect Snails" – 4:07
3. "I Want To Fall Off My Bike Today" – 4:55
4. "I Want To Be In Your Fire" – 5:12
5. "Weird Heart" – 5:12
