= The Lovely Eggs =

British band

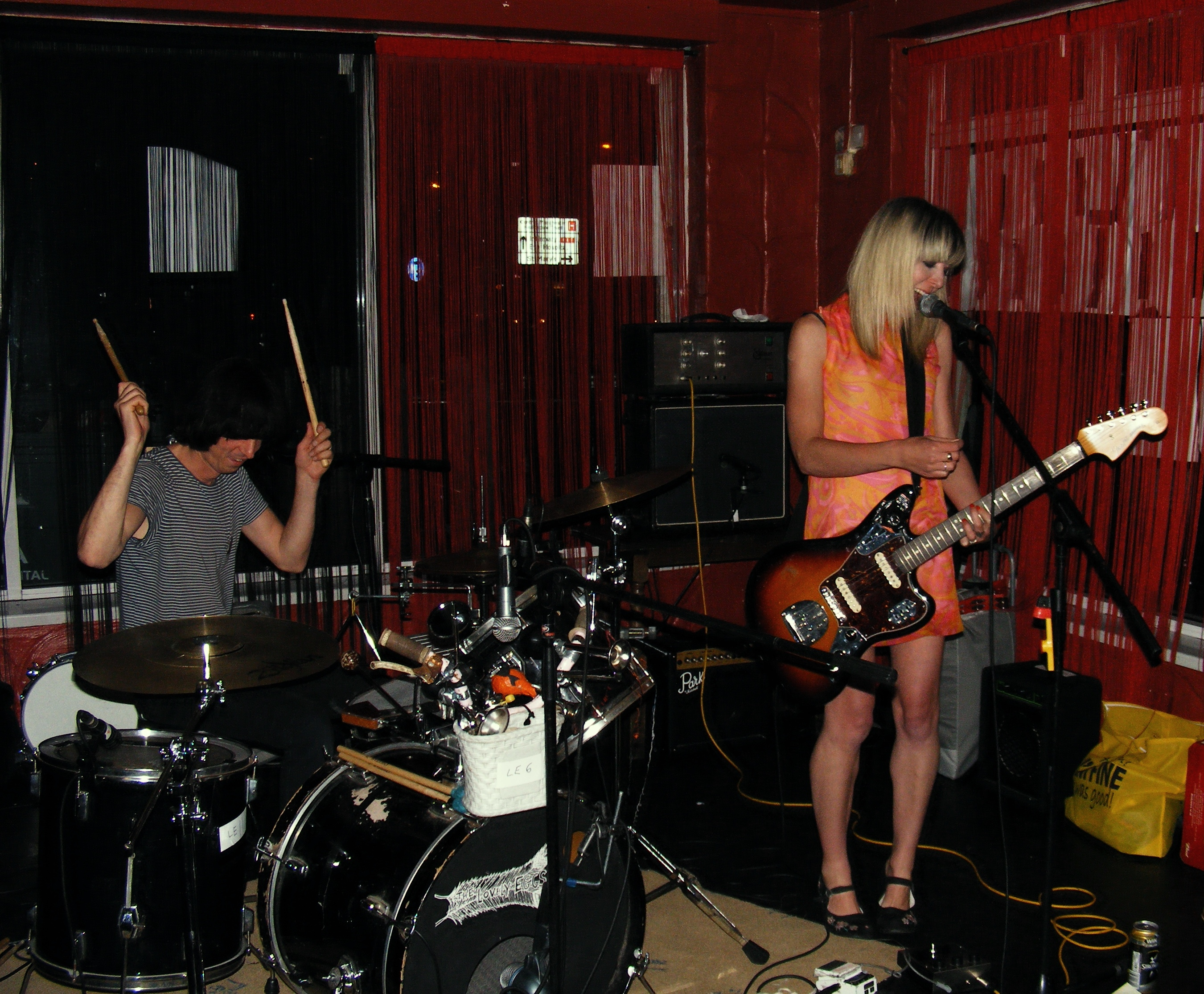
- The Lovely Eggs at Cafe Saki, Manchester, 2010

Background information
- Origin: Lancaster, Lancashire, England
- Genres: Punk; garage rock; indie rock; indie pop; lo-fi; psychedelic rock; noise pop
- Years active: 2006–present
- Labels: Cherryade; Filthy Little Angels; HHBTM; Too Pure; Odd Box; Egg Records
- Members: Holly Ross; David Blackwell
- Website: thelovelyeggs.co.uk

The Lovely Eggs are a two-piece lo-fi psychedelic punk rock band from Lancaster, England seen as one of the UK's leading D.I.Y. underground bands. They consist of married couple Holly Ross and David Blackwell. Ross was formerly the lead singer and guitarist in the all-female band Angelica. Blackwell was guitarist and founding member of the psychedelic drone rock band 3D Tanx, previously working with Damo Suzuki (as sound carrier) and Linder Sterling (for her 2006 performative artwork "The Working Class Goes to Paradise" at the Tate in London)

== Career ==
The band formed in 2005, playing their first ever gig in New York City and then returning to the UK to play nationwide shows. They gained recognition from radio coverage on BBC Radio 1 and BBC Radio 6, from DJs such as Marc Riley, Huw Stephens and Steve Lamacq.

In May 2008, they were invited into the BBC Radio 6 studio to do a live session for Marc Riley's Brain Surgery show. In August of the same year, they were again invited back to the BBC to do a session for Huw Stephens, this time for BBC Radio 1. In October 2008, their first EP entitled Have You Ever Heard The Lovely Eggs? was released through Cherryade Records (a Manchester-based DIY bedroom label run by Rachael Neiman and Adam Wiseman), which was well received with positive reviews and more airplay. In the same month, the lead track from their Have You Ever Heard The Lovely Eggs? EP ("Have You Ever Heard A Digital Accordion?"), was named XFM 'Single of The Week'.

They released their debut album, If You Were Fruit, in June 2009 on Cherryade in the UK, and in August on HHBTM Records in the US, and promoted both with a tour of the UK and US, sleeping either on or under a beach towel in the houses of strangers for 21 days straight. The next release was a Twin Peaks inspired, limited edition Halloween CD released in October 2009. Following this, the band collaborated on a limited edition cassette release, with an all-female band from Manchester, Hotpants Romance, with songs that were won in a raffle by audience members whilst the two bands toured together in June 2009. The tape named Songs about People We met on Tour was released in February 2010.

The Lovely Eggs were invited to perform at SXSW in March 2010, where they recorded a live video collaboration with musician and artist Jad Fair from the band Half Japanese.

In January 2011, they released the first single from their new album "Cob Dominos" called "Don't Look at Me (I Don't Like It)", whose video featured a guest appearance from "John Shuttleworth" as the man with the sausage roll thumb which gained wide popularity on Youtube. Cob Dominos was released on 14 February 2011 with singles "Fuck It" and "Panic Plants" released thereafter.

The band toured the UK and Europe after the album's release, including a European tour supporting Art Brut in September 2011.

On 5 December 2011, they released the first 7" single "Allergies" from their third album Wildlife on the Too Pure Label. The single was produced by Gruff Rhys who also appeared in the video (produced by Casey Raymond). Their second single "Food" was released on 14 May 2012 and was remixed by Cornershop's Tjinder Singh. "Wildlife" was released on 26 November 2012, with alongside their third and final single from the album "I Just Want Someone To Fall In Love With".

The Lovely Eggs toured to promote Wildlife while Holly was five months pregnant, and the band took a short break before releasing their fourth album This Is Our Nowhere in April 2015.

On 27 April 2015, "Magic Onion" the first single from This Is Our Nowhere was released on 7" green splatter vinyl on the Cardiff-based label Flower of Phong, run by video director Casey Raymond and was accompanied by an illustrated booklet designed by Casey.

On Record Store Day 2015, the band released a special early edition black and white pressed vinyl LP of This Is Our Nowhere: a title which sums up the band's celebration and love of a scene which doesn't exist in the eyes of the manufactured mainstream.The record received 8/10 in NME magazine.

In November 2015, the band released the second single from the album "Goofin Around In Lancashire" released on 7" "Egg" Vinyl, presented in a hand-packaged plastic case. 6 Music DJ Marc Riley declared it one of his top tracks of 2015 and invited the band to play two sessions. That year The Lovely Eggs toured the UK in March, May and November playing mainly sold-out shows. They were described in NME as "One of the country's most beloved underground bands."

In October 2016, they released 7" Vinyl "Drug Braggin" on Egg Records. Follow-up 7", "I Shouldn't Have Said That" was released in November 2017 with artwork by David Shrigley.

This Is Eggland, produced by Dave Fridmann and released in early 2018, displays a new musical direction for the band, a "heaviness that at one stage would have seemed unthinkable".

On 3 April 2020, the band released the album "I Am Moron", The album was again produced by Dave Fridmann and reached number 1 in the Official UK Independent Album Chart .

The Lovely Eggs spent the time after touring "I Am Moron" between 2021-23 making "Eggs TV" a televisual odyssey with artist Casey Raymond: A 6 part TV show shining a light on alternative and underground art, music, spoken word, comedy and British subculture. Featuring... Gruff Rhys, Stewart Lee, Katie Puckrik, Ian MacKaye, David Shrigley, Tim Presley, John Grant, Cate Le Bon, The Space Lady, Gwenifer Raymond, Quentin Smirhes,Michael Cumming, Andy Votel, Paddy Steer, Thu Tran, Bedwyr Williams, Ewan Jones Morris, Jad Fair, Steve Aylett, Maxine Peake, John Cooper Clarke, Violet Malice, Gyuri Cloe Lee, pigs X7, gillian lees, Adam york-gregory, Tim Wells, Thick Richard, Lowri Evans, Toria Garbut, Craig Atkinson, White Hills, Sean McAnulty, Cissi Efraimsson, Laura Skilbeck and Darren Andrews.

On 17 May 2024 the band released "Eggsistentialism" (Egg Records Egg 020). The album was again produced by Dave Fridmann and reached number 4 in the Official UK Independent Album Chart .

== Discography ==
=== Singles ===
- "I Like Birds But I Like Other Animals Too" - Split 7" with The Sexual Hot Bitches (2008) (Filthy Little Angels)
- "Haunt Me Out" Limited Edition CD with free half-heart Laura Palmer necklace (October 2009) (Cherryade Records)
- "Don't Look At Me (I Don't Like It)" (2011) (Cherryade Records)
- "Fuck It" 7" Vinyl (30 May 2011) (Cherryade Records)
- "Panic Plants" 7" Vinyl (31 October 2011) (Cherryade Records)
- "Allergies" 7" Yellow Vinyl (5 December 2011) (Too Pure)
- "Food" 7" Vinyl (14 May 2012) (Cherryade Records)
- "I Just Want Someone To Fall In Love With" (19 November 2012) (Egg Records)
- "Magic Onion" 7" Vinyl splatter vinyl (27 April 2015) (Flower of Phong)
- "Goofin Around In Lancashire" 7" Vinyl White Egg (13 November 2015) (Egg Records)
- "Drug Braggin'" 7" Psychedelic Swirl Vinyl (October 2016) (Egg Records)
- "I Shouldn't Have Said That" (November 2017) (Egg Records)
- "Wiggy Giggy" 7" Limited Edition Vinyl (16 February 2018) (Egg Records)
- "Big Sea" 7" Single, Limited Edition, Surf Blue vinyl (18 May 2018) (Egg Records: EGG011). Sleeve artwork by Casey Raymond.
- "This Decision" (10 January 2020) (Egg Records)
- "Still Second Rate" (3 April 2020) (Egg Records)
- "Long Stem Carnations" 7" Single, Limited Edition (500 copies), Orange vinyl (10 July 2020) (Egg Records: EGG015). Sleeve artwork by Casey Raymond.
- "I, Moron" (Featuring Iggy Pop) 7" Single, Limited Edition (1200 copies), Yellow vinyl (9 July 2021) (Egg Records: EGG016). Sleeve artwork by Casey Raymond.
- "I, Moron" (Featuring Iggy Pop) 7" Reissue Single, Limited Edition (500 copies), Red vinyl (4 February 2022) (Egg Records: EGG016). Sleeve artwork by Casey Raymond.
- "Repeat It (Andy Votel Remix)" - Split 7", Limited Edition (400 copies) Clear vinyl. Split with Hannibal Rex (July 2022) (Golden Lion Sounds GLS011)
- "Repeat It (Andy Votel Remix)" - Split 7", Limited Edition (100 copies) Black vinyl. Split with Hannibal Rex (July 2022) (Golden Lion Sounds GLS011)
- "My Mood Wave" - 7" Single, Limited Edition (500 copies) Aquamarine Translucent vinyl. (15 March 2024) (Egg Records Egg 018). First 250 copies ordered from the band website came with a shaped Lovely Eggs air freshener.
- "Nothing / Everything" - 7" Single, Limited Edition (500 copies) Yellow vinyl. (26 April 2024) (Egg Records Egg 019). The 'A' Side plays at 33 ⅓ RPM, the 'B' Side plays at 45 RPM.
- "Death Grip Kids / Memory Man" - 7" AA Single, Limited Edition (500 copies) Grey vinyl. (25 October 2024) (Egg Records Egg 021).

=== EPs ===
- Fried Egg CD (2007) Homemade Limited edition CDR
- Have You Ever Heard The Lovely Eggs? 7" Yellow Vinyl (2008) (Cherryade Records)
- "Fried Egg EP" - 10", Limited Edition (1500 copies) Translucent vinyl (4 April 2022) (Egg Records EGG017). Released in custom replica packaging to emulate the original limited edition CD-R released in 2007.

=== Albums ===
- If You Were Fruit (2009) (Cherryade Records) (Happy Happy Birthday To Me Records - US release)
- Cob Dominos (2011) CD edition via Cherryade Records (Cherryade Records CHY038), Vinyl edition via Egg Records (EGG 001), reissued in 2016 on 'Morcombe Bay Blue vinyl' via Egg Records as a limited edition of 300 copies.
- Wildlife (2012) (Egg Records)
- This Is Our Nowhere (2015) (Record store day vinyl only release 25 April, full release 4 May) (Egg Records)
- This Is Eggland (2018) (Egg Records)
- I Am Moron (2020)
- Eggsistentialism (17 May 2024) (Egg Records Egg 020). Released as a Digipack CD, on 'Mind Green' Vinyl housed in a gatefold sleeve, and also exclusively via independent record shops on 'Transparent blue vinyl with coffee splatter' again within a gatefold sleeve (Egg 020LPX). The album entered the U.K Album Chart at #78, it also entered the U.K Official Vinyl Album Chart at #6 24 - 30 May 2024.
- Bin Juice (17 October 2025) (Egg Records EGG 022). Released on neon green vinyl, and also exclusively via Rough Trade Records on 'Toxic Orange & Slime Green splatter' vinyl (Egg Records EGG022LPRT); the Rough Trade edition being limited to 300 copies.

=== Tapes ===
- Songs About People We Met On Tour (2010) Collaboration with Manchester band Hotpants Romance

=== Compilation appearances ===
- "Have You Ever Heard a Digital Accordion?" Grrrls Talk Compilation (Four Life Entertainment) (Japan) (October 2010)
- "I Like Birds But I Like Other Animals Too" on Broadcast One: New music handpicked by Dandelion Radio CD (2010) (Odd Box Records)
- "I Like Birds But I Like Other Animals Too" SXSW Liverpool Soundcity Promo Compilation CD (March 2009)
- "Tyrannosaurus Rex for Christmas" (Cherryade 4 Christmas Comp) Cherryade Records (UK) (December 2008)
- "In Watermelon Sugar" (Recipe Book compilation) The Recipe Book Records (NL) (September 2008)
- "I'm in Your Scene" (Ladyfest Manchester Compilation) Cherryade Records (UK) (August 2008)
- "I'm Going to Build My Snowman Better Than Yours" (Cherryade 3 Christmas Compilation) Cherryade Records (UK) (December 2007)
- "In Watermelon Sugar" on Ammehoelahop Vinyl LP (Transformed Dreams) (NL) (October 2006)
- "Hot Stuff" on Rare Tracks 21 CD (Visions Magazine) (Germany) (17 December 2021) Cover of the Donna Summer track performed by Pigs Pigs Pigs Pigs Pigs Pigs Pigs & The Lovely Eggs.
- "Dickhead" on Bottom Of The Hill & Ivy Room Yellow Vinyl LP (Locked In The Dressing Room LITD008) (Rep Ireland) (29 June 2022)
