= Earl Brutus =

Musical group from the United Kingdom

- Origin: United Kingdom
- Genres: Alternative rock; indie rock; art rock
- Years active: 1993–2004
- Labels: Deceptive, Fruition, Icerink, Royal Mint, Island
- Past members: Rob Marche; Jamie Fry; Nick Sanderson; Gordon King; Shinya Hayashida; Stuart Boreman

Earl Brutus were a British indie rock band that emerged in the 1990s. They were formed in 1993 by English musician Nick Sanderson, Rob Marche (formerly of JoBoxers and If?), Jamie Fry (brother of Martin Fry and formerly of World of Twist) and Stuart Boreman. Boreman left after the release of their first single "Life's Too Long" and was replaced by Gordon King, who had been in World of Twist with Fry.

== History ==
They were renowned for their chaotically raucous and visually entertaining live shows, which often featured unusual stage props, including messages and slogans that were displayed on revolving garage forecourt signs, written in neon lights or spelt out using funeral wreaths.

Musically, Earl Brutus's sound incorporated a diverse range of influences, including elements of early 1970s UK glam rock, the electronica of Kraftwerk, and the ramshackleness of the Fall. Their lyrics concentrated on the mundane side of modern British life while at the same time exploring its dark and seedy underbelly.

Despite receiving favourable press interest for the band's live shows, albums and singles, Earl Brutus failed to gain commercial success or widespread recognition and remained cult figures. Live shows were augmented by the presence of Shinya Hayashida in the band, who was employed to stand on stage and headbang or shout random abuse at the audience. They recorded a live session for Jeff Cooper at Hallam FM for his 'XS' Show (later to become radio station Radio2XS) on 4 January 1998.

After a lengthy spell of inactivity, Earl Brutus returned for a one-off live date at Hammersmith Working Men's Club in London on 7 April 2004. Proceeds from the event, which also featured a DJ set from Mani of Primal Scream, were donated to Ken Livingstone's London Mayoral election campaign. This gig also featured Frank Sidebottom (Chris Sievey) who played a truncated set as a result of being apparently drunk — and having limited vision with his papier mâché head on — that he tripped backward over one of the monitors, and fell approximately five feet down off the stage head first. He was subsequently carried out of the room, apparently unconscious.

Sanderson died on 9 June 2008 of lung cancer at the age of 47.

Fry, King, Boreman and Hayashida reformed with Laurence Bray, George Phillips and Vincent Gibson as the Pre New in June 2010, playing old World of Twist and Earl Brutus songs as well as new material. In 2010, they performed at the Glastonbury Festival. The band have since released two studio albums, Music for People Who Hate Themselves in 2012 and The Male Eunuch in 2015 (as well as a remix album Music for Homeowners in 2013).

== Discography ==
Earl Brutus discography
- Studio albums: 2
- Singles: 9

=== Studio albums ===
- Your Majesty… We Are Here (1996, Deceptive Records)
- Tonight You Are the Special One (1998, Fruition)

=== Singles ===
- "Life's Too Long" (1993), Icerink
- "Bonjour Monsieur" (1995), Royal Mint
- "Navyhead" (1996), Deceptive Records
- "Life's Too Long" (1996), Deceptive Records
- "I'm New" (1996), Deceptive Records
- "The SAS and the Glam that Goes with It" (1997), Fruition/Island - UK No. 136
- "Come Taste My Mind" (1998), Fruition/Island - UK No. 88
- "Universal Plan" (1998), Fruition/Island - UK No. 91
- "Larky" (1999), Fruition - UK No. 166
