= Ladyfest UK 2001 =

Compilation album by Various artists
- Released: 2001

Ladyfest UK 2001 was a various artists compilation CD released to coincide with the 2001 UK Ladyfest event in Glasgow.

== Track listing ==
1. Katastrophy Wife - "Gone Away"
2. Angelica - "Velveteen Dreams (Demo Version)"
3. Electrelane - "Spartakade"
4. Bis - "The End Starts Today"
5. Fake - "Cinnamon Gum"
6. Gertrude - "She Would Like To Be"
7. Akira - "Frankie T"
8. Pro Forma - "Cracked Machine"
9. Life Without Buildings - "The Leanover (Original 7" version)"
10. Kirby - "Star Cafe"
11. Angelica - "Saturn (Demo Version)"
12. Katastrophy Wife - "Poison (Acoustic Version)"
