= Hanging Around (film) =

Hanging Around (originally titled Is Mr Death In?, an anagram of the name of its director) is a 1996 film directed by Damien Hirst, which was made for The Hayward Gallery's Spellbound exhibition. The exhibition opened 100 years to the day (21 February 1896) after the Lumiere Brothers brought their newly invented cinematograph to a London audience. The film has only been seen at this exhibition, and once on network television in the UK at 23:50 on 30 November 1996. The film contains music from the band Me Me Me.

== Cast ==
The cast included Keith Allen, Eddie Izzard, Trevor Peacock, Katrine Boorman, Maia Norman and Connor Hirst.
