= Scarfo =

British rock band

- Origin: Hampshire, England
- Years active: 1994–1998
- Labels: Deceptive, Fierce Panda
- Members: Jamie Hince; Nick Prior; Al Saunders

Scarfo were a British rock band, formed in Andover, England in 1994, by former art college students Jamie Hince (vocals, guitar), Nick Prior (bass), and Al Saunders (drums). Scarfo was the culmination of several other bands and lineups involving Hince and Saunders including Remember the Rabbits (a reference to medical trials on animals), and Electric Turkey Land. The line up for both these bands included long-term friend of Hince and fellow resident of the Newbury area, Wob Williams. Williams went on to play, like Hince, with the punk-folk ensemble Blyth Power.

== Career ==
Scarfo moved to London where they played many gigs, attracting the attention of Fierce Panda Records, who issued their debut single, "Skinny" in 1995. They then signed to Deceptive Records and their self-titled debut album produced by Philip Thomas was released in November of that year to critical acclaim. They released several singles over the following three years (two of these - "Alkaline" and "Cosmonaut No. 7" - making it onto the UK Singles Chart), and the album, Luxury Plane Crash (1997).

During the height of Scarfo's early success, progress ground to a halt after Al Saunders was badly injured after being run down by a car in London. This incident caused the momentum of the band to falter and led directly to the band folding.

"Alkaline" and a cover of Elvis Costello's "I Want You" (as a bonus track), were included on Deceptive Fifty, a compilation album released by Deceptive Records to celebrate their 50th release.

Jamie Hince went on to release The Glue Hotel Tapes mini-album as Fiji on Impresario Records in February 2004 and a single, "Pillshop", also on Impresario. He is now the guitarist in the Kills.

== Discography ==
=== Albums ===
- Scarfo (November 1995), Deceptive
- Luxury Plane Crash (July 1997), Deceptive

=== Singles ===
- "Skinny" (May 1995), Fierce Panda
- "Tunnel of Love" (December 1995), Deceptive
- "Bingo England" (April 1996), Deceptive
- "ELO" (May 1997), Deceptive - UK #100
- "Alkaline" (July 1997), Deceptive - UK #61
- "Cosmonaut No. 7" (October 1997), Deceptive - UK #67
- "A Year from Monday" (September 1998), Deceptive - UK #163
