= World of Twist =

English indie pop band

- Origin: Sheffield, England
- Genres: Indie pop; alternative dance; Madchester; neo-psychedelia
- Years active: 1985–1992
- Label: Circa

World of Twist were an English indie pop band, formed in Sheffield in 1985.

== History ==
The original line-up of the band consisted of James Fry (vocals), Andrew Hobson (bass guitar), Gordon King (guitar), Tony Ogden (drums), Rory Conolly (saxophone), Nick Phillips (organ) and Andy Robbins (synthesiser). This version soon disintegrated, and some years later a new line-up emerged, this time based in Manchester.

A short lived 1986 version of World of Twist featured Gordon King (vocalist and co-songwriter), Tony Ogden (co-songwriter), Andy Hobson (Bass, Keyboards), Neil Drabble (visuals).

The 1989 version of World of Twist featured Ogden (now vocalist and co-songwriter), King (guitar and co-songwriter), and Hobson (synthesisers) joined by Alan Frost (visual effects, synthesisers), Julia aka M.C. Shells (swirls and sea noises) and Angela Reilly (visual effects). Nick Sanderson (drums) joined some time later.

A demo tape (featuring "The Storm", "Blackpool Tower Suite", "The Spring", and "She's a Rainbow") released in early 1990 drew attention to the band, and a recording contract with Circa Records followed. The record label issued the singles "The Storm" (produced by Clif Brigden) that same year with "Sons of the Stage" also (produced by Clif Brigden) and "Sweets" following in 1991. A cover of The Rolling Stones' "She's a Rainbow", originally issued as the B-side of "The Storm", was reissued with new dance mixes by Fluke in 1992. The original B-side version had been one of the last tracks produced by Martin Hannett, who died in 1991.

The band's live show and Radio 1 sessions for John Peel and Mark Goodier, and the first two Clif Brigden produced singles raised expectations, but their debut album, Quality Street (1991), met with a mixed critical reception and poor commercial success. The cover was illustrated with the band dressed in Georgian costumes styled on the Quality Street chocolate assortment packaging, posed in the Pantiles in Royal Tunbridge Wells.

While World of Twist never toured in North America, "Sons of the Stage" was an indie/club hit in Toronto and New York. Oasis considered naming themselves after the song, and it was later covered by Oasis's successor group Beady Eye, as a B-side to their debut single, "Bring the Light".

Work began on a follow-up album and there were plans for further touring, but problems emerged when Ogden decided that he no longer wanted to sing. This, coupled with creative differences within the band, contributed to the demise of the group in 1992.

Gordon King, James Fry and Nick Sanderson went on to form Earl Brutus in 1993 with Rob Marche (formerly of Joboxers and Subway Sect) and Stuart Boreman. King, Fry and Boreman would later form The Pre New in 2010. Some of those involved are now working as Quatermass 3 as of 2020.

Tony Ogden died on 26 July 2006, in Bramhall, Stockport,Greater Manchester, on the verge of a return to the music industry with Bubblegum Secret Pop Explosion. He was 44. Few details on his death have been released.

Quality Street was reissued with bonus tracks on CD and heavyweight vinyl by British independent record label 3 Loop Music in 2013.

== Discography ==
=== Album ===
- Quality Street (Circa, 1991) – UK No. 50

=== Singles ===
- "The Storm" (Circa, 1990) – UK No. 42
- "Sons of the Stage" (Circa, 1991) – UK No. 47
- "Sweets" (Circa, 1991) – UK No. 58
- "She's a Rainbow (remixes)" (Circa, 1992) – UK No. 62
- "The Sausage" (Caff, 1992, demo recordings from 1985)
