= Ladyfest =

Art festival started in 2000

Album cover art from Ladyfest UK 2003 CD

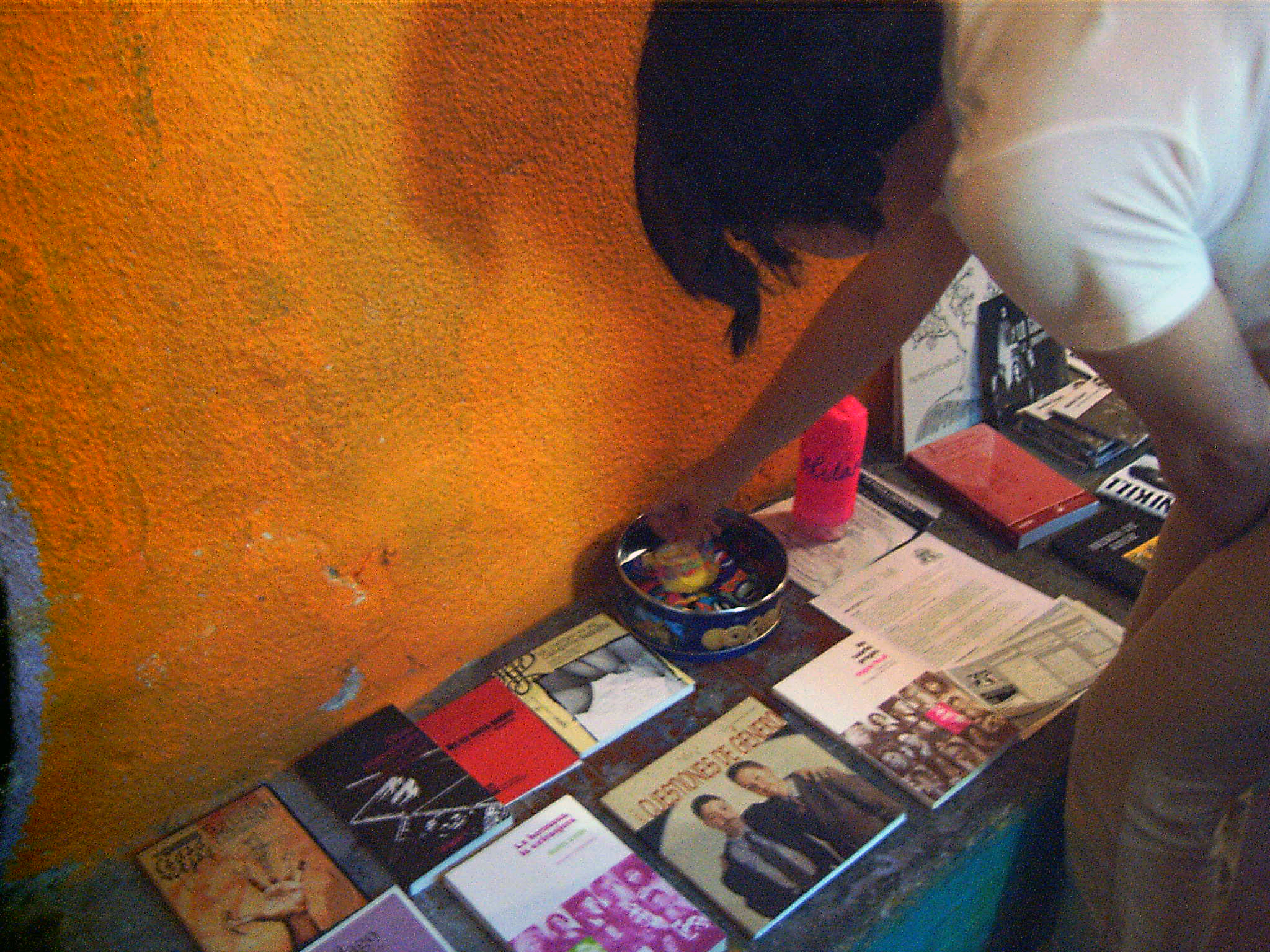
A zine/CD stall at a Ladyfest

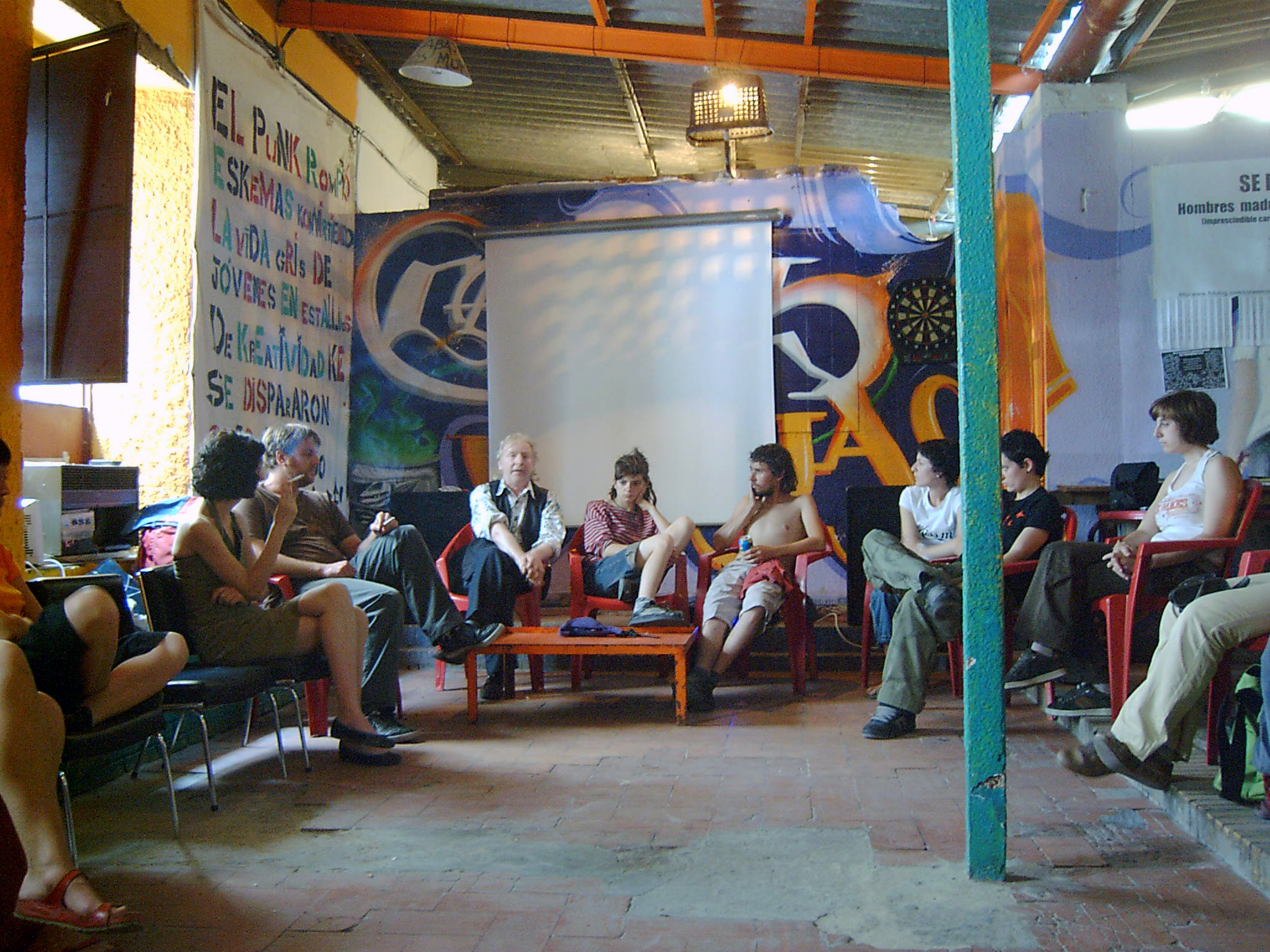
A workshop at a Ladyfest

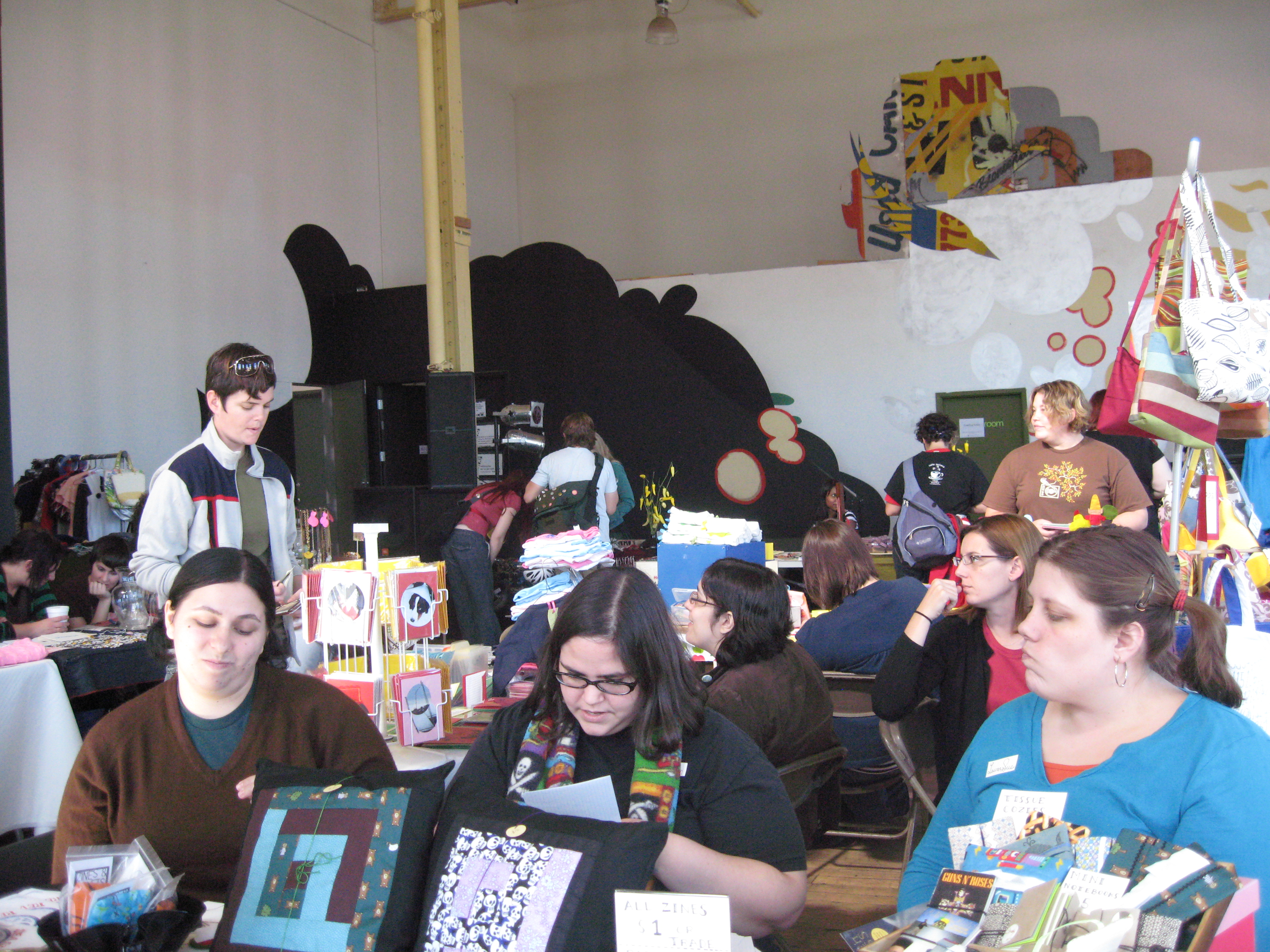
A craft fair at a Ladyfest

Ladyfest is a community-based, not-for-profit global music and arts festival for feminist and women artists. Individual Ladyfests differ, but usually feature a combination of bands, musical groups, performance artists, authors, spoken word and visual artists, films, lectures, art exhibitions and workshops; it is organized by volunteers.

== History ==
The first ever Ladyfest was conducted in Olympia, Washington in August 2000 with over 2000 people attending. Prime motivators in the event were Sarah Dougher, Sleater-Kinney, and Teresa Carmody. Also performing were The Gossip, Bangs, The Need, The Rondelles, Bratmobile, Slumber Party, and Neko Case, Ladyfests in the world have staged De Introns, Helluvah, Planete concrete, EDH, Sans gène, Synth Cherries, Heart of Wolves, Nasty Candy & Coco Lipstick .

Since the first Ladyfest, the event has branched all over the world in places such as Albuquerque, Amsterdam, Atlanta, Belfast, Belgium, Bellingham, Bloomington, Berlin, Birmingham, Bordeaux, Brighton, Bristol, Brooklyn, Budapest, Cambridge, Columbus, Cork, Chicago, Cardiff, Dijon, Dublin, Glasgow, Grenoble, Kassel, Lansing, MI, Leeds, London, Los Angeles, Madrid, Manchester, Melbourne, Miami, Orlando, Ottawa, Oxford, Paris, Philadelphia, Riverside, California, Scranton, San Francisco, San Diego, Sevilla, Sheffield, Tallinn, Texas, Toronto, Toulouse, Traverse City, Washington, D.C., Wellington, New Orleans, New Zealand, Shanghai, China and more. Each new festival is organized locally and independently of other Ladyfest events in other states or countries, primarily by volunteers, and most proceeds are donated to non-profit organizations.

Ten years on from the original event Ladyfest is still going strong as a global phenomenon. The 2010 London Ladyfest was promoted as a "tenth anniversary" event, "celebrating a decade of DIY feminist arts and activism".

Ladyfests in the world propose different kinds of activities, such as concerts, workshops, conferences, debates, about very diverse topics. Workshops range from screenprinting, carpentry, stop-motion, plumbing-lessons to crocheting.

Ladyfest has inspired spin off events such as LaD.I.Y.fest in Berlin, Grrl Fest in Melbourne, and Grrl Fair in Santa Ana, CA. LaD.I.Y fest in Berlin aimed to emphasise the do-it-yourself, participatory aspect of the festival. And Grrl Fest in Melbourne started in 2013 in a warehouse in Melbourne. Harbouring the same ethos as a Lady Fest including music, art, zines and stalls. Grrl Fest is now an annual event with a wide network and sponsors: www.grrlfest.com Grrl Fair in Santa Ana started in 2001 and ran through 2013. Organizers were inspired by fests like Ladyfest and Homo-a-gogo and wanted to bring DIY feminist punk ethos to their community.

== Compilation albums ==
- Ladyfest UK 2001
- Ladyfest UK 2003
- Ladyfest East 2001

== See also ==
- List of Ladyfest Festivals
- All-women band
- Women's music
- Riot Grrrl
- Yoyo A Go Go
