= Justin Welch =

English drummer

- Born: Justin Steven Welch; 4 December 1972 (age 53); Nuneaton, Warwickshire, England
- Genres: Alternative rock, Britpop
- Occupation: Musician
- Instrument: Drums
- Member of: The Jesus and Mary Chain; Piroshka
- Formerly of: Elastica; Suede; Me Me Me; Lush
- Website: drumtracksbyjustinwelchelastica

Justin Steven Welch (born 4 December 1972) is an English musician, best known as the drummer of the rock bands Elastica, Suede and later Lush. He is currently the drummer of the alternative rock band The Jesus and Mary Chain.

== Biography ==
Welch moved to London in his late teens and studied at London's Drumtech drum school. He played drums in a number of bands in the early 1990s, including an early line-up of Suede (where he would first meet Justine Frischmann) and Spitfire.

In 1996, Welch also formed the Britpop supergroup Me Me Me with Blur bassist Alex James and The Lilac Time frontman Stephen Duffy, who released one single "Hanging Around".

Elastica split in 2001 and Welch moved to Devon where he taught drums in secondary and primary schools.

In 2012, he was in a duo with friend and former EMF frontman James Atkin called 'Asbo Kid'. He also played drums for Brighton-based band Das Fenster.

In 2013, Welch briefly re-united with Suede for several gigs to replace drummer Simon Gilbert who was unable to play due to contracting tuberculosis.

It was announced, in September 2015, that Welch would play drums in the newly reformed Lush.

On 21 January 2017, three-quarters of the original line-up of Elastica – Matthews, Annie Holland and Justin Welch – worked together on the remastering of Elastica.

In December 2017, the Elastica Facebook page announced that Welch featured on the debut single of a new British rock band called The Rockerati, "16 Tons". A post on Welch's personal Facebook page noted that the release had been receiving substantial radio airplay in the US.

In 2022, Welch joined The Jesus and Mary Chain as their new drummer playing festivals throughout that year and shows performing their seminal sophomore album Darklands. Welch continues to perform live with the band on all forthcoming dates.

== Personal life ==
He lives in St Leonards-on-Sea and is married to keyboardist Sharon Mew (known for playing in Elastica on the band's second album, and Heave), who is currently working as an artist.

== Discography ==
=== Albums ===
- Spitfire (1994, by Spitfire)
- Elastica (1995, by Elastica)
- The Menace (2000, by Elastica)
- Brickbat (2019, by Piroshka)
- Love Drips and Gathers (2021, by Piroshka)
- St Leopards (2022, by Aircooled)
- Love Songs From A Broken Heart (2025, by The Stalwart lovers)

=== Singles and EPs ===
- 17 (1997) Stephen Duffy
- 2 Tone Techno (2012, by The Asbo Kid)
- Blind Spot (2016, by Lush)
- "16 Tons" (2017, by The Rockerati)
