= Elastica =

British rock band

- Elastica in 2000

Background information
- Origin: London, England
- Genres: Britpop; alternative rock; post-punk; new wave
- Years active: 1992–2001
- Labels: Deceptive; Geffen; DGC; Atlantic; Wichita
- Spinoff of: Suede
- Past members: Justine Frischmann; Justin Welch; Donna Matthews; Annie Holland; David Bush; Kevin Ind; Tim Warren; Pete Goodfellow; Sheila Chipperfield; Paul Jones; Sharon Mew

Elastica were an English rock band formed in London in 1992 by guitarist/singer Justine Frischmann and drummer Justin Welch after their departure from Suede. The band was stylistically influenced by punk rock, post-punk and new wave music. The band's members changed several times, with Frischmann and Welch being the only members who remained in Elastica from its formation to its dissolution.

Elastica quickly rose to prominence after the release of their debut single "Stutter" in November 1993, and the band's next three singles charted in the Top 20 of the UK Singles Chart. Their debut album Elastica (1995) was an immediate success and broke records for the fastest-selling debut album in the UK; the album also found success in the United States and produced the band's highest-charting US Hot 100 hit, "Connection". However, the band later found itself in controversy over accusations of plagiarism, which were settled out-of-court.

Development on a follow-up album languished due to interpersonal disputes, line-up changes and Frischmann's heroin addiction during the late 1990s. In 2000, Elastica released their second album, The Menace, which was less well received critically or commercially. After struggling to come up with new material for a third album, the band amicably broke up in October 2001.

== History ==
In mid-1992, ex-Suede band members Justine Frischmann and Justin Welch decided to form a group. By autumn of that year, bassist Annie Holland and guitarist Donna Matthews were added. After initially gigging under names such as "Onk", they settled on the name "Elastica" in October 1992. They released their first single, "Stutter", in October 1993, which benefited from the promotional efforts of BBC Radio 1 DJ and Deceptive Records label boss Steve Lamacq, who discovered the band earlier that year. In 1994, they released two UK Top 20 singles, "Line Up" and "Connection", and performed on numerous radio shows. Frischmann's relationship with Blur frontman Damon Albarn made tabloid headlines.

Elastica's first LP, Elastica, was released in March 1995, and entered the UK Albums Chart at No. 1; it became the fastest-selling debut album since Oasis' Definitely Maybe. This record was held for over ten years, until it was surpassed by the Arctic Monkeys' debut Whatever People Say I Am, That's What I'm Not in 2006. The album was preceded by their fourth single "Waking Up" which went to No. 13 on the UK Singles Chart, their highest placing therein.

The band became subject to controversy when several publishers sued them for plagiarism claiming that many of their melodies were taken from compositions by the art punk band Wire (whom they counted as one of their main influences), and the Stranglers, who had shared the same London rehearsal studios with Elastica in 1994. Notably, Wire's "I Am the Fly" has a chorus similar to Elastica's "Line Up" and the intro synthesizer part in Elastica's "Connection" (later also repeated on guitar) is lifted from the guitar riff in Wire's "Three Girl Rhumba" and transposed a semitone, while "Waking Up" bore a marked resemblance to the Stranglers' song "No More Heroes". The disputes were resolved by out-of-court settlements.

One of the members of The Stranglers, JJ Burnel, later said, "Yes, it sounds like us, but so what? Of course there's plagiarism, but unless you live in a vacuum there's always going to be. It's the first thing our publishers have done for us in 20 years, but if it had been up to me, I wouldn't have bothered." Another member of The Stranglers, Jet Black, even thanked Elastica in Melody Maker for bringing attention to his old band.

The mid-1990s saw Elastica release music in the USA. "Stutter" and "Connection" received airplay on modern rock radio and both charted on the Billboard Hot 100, peaking at numbers 67 and 53 respectively; their debut album also charted and was later certified gold. After performing at the 1995 Glastonbury Festival, the band joined the Lollapalooza tour continuing an almost solid year of constant gigs where they toured North America four times. Citing exhaustion, Annie Holland quit the band in early August 1995 and was replaced for the remainder of the tour by session bassist Abby Travis. Holland was not permanently replaced until the arrival of Sheila Chipperfield in the spring of 1996. Around this time, keyboardist David Bush (ex-the Fall) was added to the line-up.

After playing more shows and demoing new material in the first half of 1996, Elastica entered the studio in the later part of the year to begin work on their second album. By late 1998 Matthews had left the band. She was replaced by guitarist Paul Jones (of the band Linoleum) and keyboardist Mew. Around this time, Chipperfield was replaced by the returning Annie Holland.

As a tribute to the "lost years" of the band, a self-titled six-track EP appeared in August 1999, collecting a variety of recordings from a multitude of aborted sessions. This EP marked the first new material from the band in over four years. After re-recording most of these songs in mid-1999, along with new compositions, the band played their first set of shows in years. In November 1999, Elastica parted ways with their international distributor Geffen after their US distributor DGC was merged into Geffen/Interscope amidst a label shakeup, and the band subsequently signed with Atlantic Records. Their second proper album, The Menace, was released in April 2000; it was significantly less critically and commercially successful than the band's debut album. In February 2001, Deceptive Records closed down due to financial struggles and Atlantic Records dropped the band soon after due to poor sales, leaving the band without any record label. In October 2001, following fruitless sessions for an intended third Elastica album, the band announced their amicable break-up, owing to exhaustion from touring and disappointing sales of The Menace. The band's farewell single, "The Bitch Don't Work", was released by Wichita Recordings in November 2001.

=== After the break-up ===
In 2005, Frischmann emigrated to Boulder, Colorado, and studied art at Naropa University. She had begun working as an artist by 2008, and later moved to the San Francisco Bay Area. Matthews had a band called Klang in 2004 and is now a pastor in Totnes; according to a recent BBC 6 show she has been linked romantically to Lawrence Chandler of Bowery Electric. Holland lives in Brighton. Welch and Mew are married, and live in Hastings. Welch played drums for Lush's 2015-16 reunion shows and now plays in Piroshka, releasing two albums on Bella Union. Jones is the A&R man at Rough Trade joining after managing his Slogan label, which released the Fall's Fall Heads Roll. He signed the group Warpaint.

On 21 January 2017, the band's official Facebook page posted photos featuring three-quarters of the original line-up – Matthews, Holland and Welch – during a visit to Abbey Road Studios in London. They were working on a remaster of their debut Elastica with Mastering engineer Sean McGee. Frischmann also worked on the remaster. The record was reissued in April on Record Store Day.

== Members ==
Final line-up

- Justine Frischmann – lead vocals, rhythm guitar (1992–2001)
- Justin Welch – drums (1992–2001)
- Annie Holland – bass (1992–1995, 1999–2001)
- David Bush – keyboards (1996–2001)
- Paul Jones – lead guitar (1998–2001)
- Sharon Mew – keyboards, backing vocals (1999–2001)

Former members

- Donna Matthews – lead guitar, backing vocals (1992–1998)
- Sheila Chipperfield – bass (1996–1998)

Guest/touring musicians

- Abby Travis – bass (touring, 1995–1996)
- Damon Albarn – keyboards (1995, 1999; credited under the anagrammatical pseudonyms "Dan Abnormal" on Elastica and as "Norman Balda" on The Menace)
- Antony Genn – keyboards (1995–1996; touring)

== Discography ==
=== Studio albums ===
Year	Album details	Peak chart positions						Sales	Certificates
Year	Album details	UK	AUS	CAN	NZ	SWE	US	Sales	Certificates
1995	Elastica: Released: 13 March 1995; Label: Deceptive/Geffen	1	57	31	20	34	66	UK: 270,000; US: 556,000; WW: 1,000,000	UK: Gold; CAN: Gold; US: Gold
2000	The Menace: Released: 3 April 2000; Label: Deceptive/Atlantic	24	—	—	—	—	—	US: 31,000	

=== Extended play ===
- Elastica 6 Track EP (23 August 1999)

=== Compilation album ===
- The Radio One Sessions (29 October 2001)

=== Singles ===
Year	Song	Peak chart positions							Album
Year	Song	UK	AUS	CAN	CAN Alt	US	US Alt	US Main	Album
1993	"Stutter"	80	125	—	4^{1}	67^{1}	10^{1}	—	Elastica
1994	"Line Up"	20	142	—	—	—	—	—	Elastica
1994	"Connection"	17	71	9	11	53	2	40	Elastica
1995	"Waking Up"	13	—	—	—	—	—	—	Elastica
1995	"Car Song"	—	106	—	14	—	33	—	Elastica
1999	"How He Wrote Elastica Man"	—	—	—	—	—	—	—	6 Track EP
2000	"Mad Dog God Dam"	44	—	—	—	—	—	—	The Menace
2001	"The Bitch Don't Work"	87	—	—	—	—	—	—	Non-album single

1.Did not chart until 1995.
