= Annie Holland =

British musician (born 1965)

- Born: Annabel Holland; 26 August 1965 (age 60); London, England
- Genres: Alternative rock; indie rock; Britpop
- Occupation: Musician
- Instrument: Bass guitar
- Years active: 1992–2001

Annabel "Annie" Holland (born 26 August 1965) is an English former musician. She was the bass guitarist of the Britpop band Elastica.

Holland had an Elastica song titled in her honour. "Annie" was written by guitarist Donna Matthews and her friend Jane Oliver and is about going down to Brighton to visit Holland, which is where she spent most of the time when the band were not working.

Holland left the band after the Féile Festival on 6 August 1995. Although she had some well-publicised arguments with Matthews about the future of Elastica, Holland left because she was fed up with the constant touring and was suffering quite badly from repetitive strain injury. At the time Elastica had been on the road for almost a year, and with even more dates being added to their schedule, Holland decided enough was enough.

The touring just got too much, I missed my friends and family in Brighton. We'd been on the road for months and I'd been looking forward to a break after T in the Park and the Feile Festival. But then we were offered the Lollapalooza tour and I couldn't face it.

Holland re-joined Elastica in 1999 and remained a member until the band's demise in 2001.

On 21 January 2017, three-quarters of the original line-up of Elastica – Matthews, Annie Holland and Justin Welch – worked together on the remastering of Elastica.

Holland now works as a gardener and was in a relationship with former actor Anthony "Binky" Baker until his death in 2023. He was formerly married to BBC DJ Annie Nightingale.
