= Justine Frischmann =

English musician (born 1969)

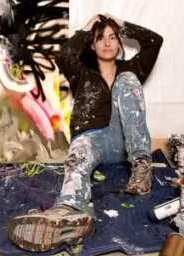
- Frischmann in her studio, 2010

Background information
- Born: Justine Elinor Frischmann; 16 September 1969 (age 56); Twickenham, Greater London, England
- Genres: Alternative rock; Britpop
- Occupations: Musician; painter
- Instruments: Vocals; guitar
- Years active: 1989–2002 (musician); 1999–present (painter, artist)
- Formerly of: Suede; Elastica
- Spouse: Ian Faloona (m. 2008)
- Partner(s): Brett Anderson (1988–1991); Damon Albarn (1991–1998)
- Website: justinefrischmann.net

Justine Elinor Frischmann (born 16 September 1969) is an English artist and retired musician. After forming Suede, she co-founded the Britpop band Elastica before retiring from the music industry and pursuing a career as an artist.

== Early years ==
Frischmann was born on 16 September 1969 in Twickenham, England, the daughter of Wilem Frischmann, a Hungarian Holocaust survivor who is the former chairman of the Pell Frischmann company of consulting engineers, and a Russian mother. Her parents are Jewish. She grew up in Twickenham, Greater London, and attended St Paul's Girls School, before studying at the Bartlett School of Architecture at University College London (UCL) from 1989 to 1993.

== Career ==
=== Music ===
Frischmann began writing and studying music at age 11.

She was a founding member of the band Suede with Brett Anderson, whom she met at UCL in 1988. She left the band in October 1991. In the 2018 documentary The Insatiable Ones, Anderson cites her as a highly significant influence on the band's first album.

Frischmann later founded and fronted her own band, Elastica. In 1994, Elastica were voted Best New Band by NME readers at the Brit awards. They were signed to Deceptive Records in the UK, and later with Geffen Records in Europe and the US. Their first album, Elastica, released in 1995, became the fastest-selling debut album in UK history. In 1995, Elastica were nominated for the Mercury Music Prize for Elastica. The album went on to sell over a million copies worldwide. In 2001, the band announced an amicable breakup, citing, in part, burnout from a grueling touring schedule.

Frischmann spent the next few years developing artist M.I.A., whom she discovered. M.I.A. was Frischmann's friend and flatmate. Frischmann co-wrote and produced M.I.A.'s demos for her first album, Arular, most notably its 2003 single "Galang".

In 2017, Rough Trade Records released a remastered version of Elastica. In 2019, Rough Trade released a limited edition Elastica BBC sessions album on UK Record Store Day.

=== Television ===
In 2003, Frischmann co-presented a series called Dreamspaces for BBC Television about modern architecture. Also in 2003, she narrated the Channel 4 special The Madness of Prince Charming, which documented Adam Ant's career and struggle with mental illness. In 2004, she presented The South Bank Show and was a judge for the RIBA Stirling Prize for Architecture.

=== Art ===
In 2005, Frischmann moved to Boulder, Colorado, to enroll in a master's program in visual arts at Naropa University, a small, Buddhist-inspired liberal arts college, and "become a nobody". In 2012, her work was shortlisted for the UK's Marmite Prize for painting, and she has been included in The Amsterdam List of 1000 Living Painters.

In a 2012 interview, Frischmann said, "The themes and ideas I am working with are in direct relation to an ongoing personal narrative; the big questions are reflected in the choices I make in my art ... [including] my ever-evolving relationship with my spiritual faith. I think my approach and aesthetics reveal internal struggles and speak to my family origins and history."

In a 2016 interview with The Guardian regarding her art career, Frischmann stated, "I don't really have any desire to make music, to be honest."

== Personal life ==
Frischmann dated her Suede bandmate Brett Anderson at the time they co-founded the group. She then dated Blur lead singer Damon Albarn from 1991 to 1998. Their breakup served as inspiration for Blur's 1999 singles "No Distance Left to Run" and "Tender".

In 2008, she married Ian Faloona, a professor of meteorology at the University of California, Davis. They live in the North Bay of the San Francisco Bay Area.
