= Deceptive Records =

British independent record label

Deceptive Records Ltd.
- Genre: Alternative rock
- Founded: 2 November 1993
- Founder: Steve Lamacq
- Defunct: 4 February 2001
- Fate: Closed
- Headquarters: London, United Kingdom
- Website: http://www.deceptive.co.uk/

Deceptive Records was a British independent record label formed in 1993 by Steve Lamacq, Tony Smith and Alan James, which concentrated on rock and alternative rock. The most famous group signed to the label were Elastica.

Steve Lamacq left the company after the release of Elastica's first album to avoid accusations of partiality on the Evening Session, his BBC Radio 1 show. Owing to financial struggles, the label closed down on 4 February 2001.

== Bands and artists ==
- Angelica
- Collapsed Lung
- Elastica
- The Junket
- Scarfo
- Snuff
- Earl Brutus
- Jonathan Fire*Eater
- Shriek
- Spare Snare
- Superfine
- Unun
- The Pin Ups
- The Prisoners
- Lauren Laverne
- Idlewild
- Placebo
- Ten Benson

== See also ==
- Lists of record labels
