= List of 1990s albums considered the best =

This is a list of 1990s albums that multiple music journalists, music magazine, and professional music review websites have considered to be among the best of the 1990s and of all time, separated into the years of each album's release. The albums listed here are included on at least four separate "best/greatest of the 1990s/all time" lists from different professional publications (inclusive of all genres and nationalities) as chosen by their editorial staffs or by a sample size of an entire publication's audience, and/or hall of fame awards and historical preservation measures.

== List ==
=== 1990 ===
Release date	Album	Artist	Genre(s)	Label	Notes	Accolades
15 January 1990	Reading, Writing and Arithmetic	The Sundays	Dream pop; indie pop	Rough Trade; DGC		NME's "The 500 Greatest Albums Of All Time": No. 277; Uncut's "The 500 Greatest Albums of the 1990s": No. 134; Melody Maker's "All Time Top 100 Albums": No. 60; Ned Raggett's Top Albums of the 90s: No. 32
January 1990	Flood	They Might Be Giants	Alternative rock	Elektra		Pitchfork's "The 100 Best Albums of the 1990s" (1999): No. 25; Strange Currencies' Top 100 Albums of the 1990s: No. 80; Treble's "Top 150 Albums of the 90s" No. 95; 33 1/3 #88 (ISBN 978-1-62356-915-0)
5 February 1990	Chill Out	The KLF	Ambient; ambient house; sound collage	KLF Communications	Ambient-styled concept album featuring an extensive selection of samples, portraying a mythical night-time journey throughout the U.S. Gulf Coast states, beginning in Texas and ending in Louisiana.	Paste's "The 300 Greatest Albums of All Time": No. 286; Uncut's "The 500 Greatest Albums of the 1990s": No. 206; Pitchfork's "The 150 Best Albums of the 1990s": No. 76; Laut's List of Milestone Albums; Groove Magazine's Best Electronic Albums 1988–2013: No. 35
19 March 1990	Violator	Depeche Mode	Synth-pop; electropop; alternative rock; dance; gothic rock	Mute	It is considered one of the darkest albums.	Reception
10 April 1990	People's Instinctive Travels and the Paths of Rhythm	A Tribe Called Quest	East Coast hip hop; alternative hip hop; progressive rap; jazz rap	Jive		Accolades
10 April 1990	Fear of a Black Planet	Public Enemy	East Coast hip hop; hardcore hip hop; political rap; progressive rap; sampledelia	Def Jam; Columbia	Contributed significantly to the popularity of Afrocentric and political subject matter in hip hop, and the genre's mainstream resurgence at the time.	Appraisal
19 April 1990	Repeater	Fugazi	Post-hardcore	Dischord		Accolades
18 May 1990	AmeriKKKa's Most Wanted	Ice Cube	West Coast hip hop; gangsta rap; political hip hop; hardcore hip hop	Priority		Accolades
26 June 1990	Goo	Sonic Youth	Alternative rock; noise rock	DGC		NME's "The 500 Greatest Albums Of All Time": No. 426; Uncut's "The 500 Greatest Albums of the 1990s": No. 257; Spin's "The 300 Best Albums of the Past 30 Years (1985–2014)": No. 148; Pitchfork's "The 150 Best Albums of the 1990s": No. 88
27 July 1990	Bellybutton	Jellyfish	Power pop	Charisma		Uncut's "The 500 Greatest Albums of the 1990s": No. 72; Classic Rock's Greatest Albums of the 90's: No. 36; Pause & Play's "The 90s Top 100 Essential Albums"; Colin Larkin's All Time Top 1000 Albums: No. 557
10 September 1990	Ragged Glory	Neil Young & Crazy Horse	Garage rock; grunge	Reprise		Uncut's "The 500 Greatest Albums of the 1990s": No. 34; Rolling Stone's "100 Best Albums of the '90s": No. 77; Robert Dimery's 1001 Albums You Must Hear Before You Die; Tom Moon's 1,000 Recordings to Hear Before You Die.
14 September 1990	Mama Said Knock You Out	LL Cool J	Hip hop; East Coast hip-hop	Def Jam; Columbia		Robert Dimery's 1001 Albums You Must Hear Before You Die; Rolling Stone's "The 500 Greatest Albums of All Time": No. 246; Rolling Stone's "100 Best Albums of the '90s": No. 56; The Source's "The 100 Best Rap Albums of All Time"
17 September 1990	Heaven or Las Vegas	Cocteau Twins	Dream pop; ambient pop	4AD		Critical reception and legacy
24 September 1990	Rust in Peace	Megadeth	Thrash metal	Capitol	Regarded as one of the best thrash metal records of all time.	Legacy and influence
1 October 1990	The La's	The La's	Alternative rock; jangle pop; skiffle	Polydor; Go!; London	Widely considered to be a precursor to the Britpop phenomenon of the mid-1990s.	NME's "The 500 Greatest Albums Of All Time": No. 153; Uncut's "The 500 Greatest Albums of the 1990s": No. 41; Treble's "Top 100 Albums of the 90s"; Robert Dimery's 1001 Albums You Must Hear Before You Die
15 October 1990	Nowhere	Ride	Shoegaze; neo-psychedelia; noise pop	Creation	Acclaimed as one of the greatest albums of the shoegaze genre.	Critical reception
17 September 1990	Canción Animal	Soda Stereo	Alternative rock	Sony Music; Columbia	Considered one of the best and most influential albums in the history of Latin American rock music, with many calling it the best album to ever come out of South America.	Al Borde's Top 250 albums of Ibero-American Rock: #2; Rolling Stone Argentina's "The 100 Greatest Albums of National Rock": No. 9; Indiehoy's 50 Best Albums of the 90s: No. 28; Billboard's "The 50 Greatest Latin Albums of the Past 50 Years"
22 October 1990	Behaviour	Pet Shop Boys	Synth-pop; dance-pop	Parlophone		Critical reception NME's "The 500 Greatest Albums Of All Time": No. 234
5 November 1990	Pills 'n' Thrills and Bellyaches	Happy Mondays	Madchester; baggy; dance-rock	Factory		NME's "The 500 Greatest Albums Of All Time": No. 413; Uncut's "The 500 Greatest Albums of the 1990s": No. 54; Robert Dimery's 1001 Albums You Must Hear Before You Die; Q's "90 Best Albums of the 1990s"

=== 1991 ===
Release Date	Album	Artist	Genre(s)	Label	Notes	Accolades
4 March 1991	The White Room	The KLF	Electronica; acid house; rave	KLF Communications		Critical reception
27 March 1991	Spiderland	Slint	Post-rock; post-hardcore; math rock	Touch and Go	Widely regarded as foundational to the 1990s post-rock and math rock movements. It is considered one of the darkest albums.	NME's "The 500 Greatest Albums Of All Time": No. 314; Uncut's "The 500 Greatest Albums of the 1990s": No. 19; Spin's "The 300 Best Albums of the Past 30 Years (1985–2014)": No. 273; Pitchfork's "The 150 Best Albums of the 1990s": No. 83
2 April 1991	The Orb's Adventures Beyond the Ultraworld	The Orb	Electronic; ambient house; dance; chill-out; ambient dub		Credited with popularizing the ambient house movement.	Reception Uncut's "The 500 Greatest Albums of the 1990s": No. 254
8 April 1991	Blue Lines	Massive Attack	Trip hop; British hip hop; electropop	Wild Bunch; Virgin	Generally regarded as the first "trip hop" album.	Reception
22 April 1991	Peggy Suicide	Julian Cope	Art rock; psychedelic rock	Island		Uncut's "The 500 Greatest Albums of the 1990s": No. 50; Robert Dimery's 1001 Albums You Must Hear Before You Die; Select's Best Albums of the 90s: No. 87; Ned Raggett's Top Albums of the 90s: No. 100
14 May 1991	Yerself Is Steam	Mercury Rev	Neo-psychedelia; psychedelic rock; art pop; art punk; shoegaze	Mint Films/Jungle Records; Columbia		Uncut's "The 500 Greatest Albums of the 1990s": No. 334; Ned Raggett's Top Albums of the 90s: No. 8; Select's Best Albums of the 90s: No. 62; Rockdelux's Best 150 Albums of the 90s: No. 28
14 May 1991	O.G. Original Gangster	Ice-T	Gangsta rap	Sire		Robert Dimery's 1001 Albums You Must Hear Before You Die; NME's "The 500 Greatest Albums Of All Time": No. 318; Select's Best Albums of the 90s: No. 71; Spin's "The 300 Best Albums of the Past 30 Years (1985–2014)": No. 274
12 August 1991	Metallica	Metallica	Heavy metal	Elektra		Accolades
27 August 1991	Ten	Pearl Jam	Grunge; alternative rock; hard rock	Epic	Considered to have been instrumental in the rise and dominance of alternative rock throughout the decade.	Legacy
16 September 1991	Laughing Stock	Talk Talk	Post-rock; art rock; ambient	Verve; Polydor	Cited as a watershed entry for the at-the-time budding post-rock genre.	Legacy
23 September 1991	Screamadelica	Primal Scream	Alternative rock; alternative dance; neo-psychedelia; Madchester; dance-rock; acid house	Creation (UK); Sire/Warner Bros. (US)		Critical reception and legacy
23 September 1991	Trompe Le Monde	Pixies	Alternative rock	4AD		Uncut's "The 500 Greatest Albums of the 1990s": No. 383; Pitchfork's Top 100 Albums of the 1990s (2003): No. 83; Treble's Top 100 Albums of the ’90s; Classic Rock and Metal Hammer's 200 Greatest Albums of the 90s
24 September 1991	Nevermind	Nirvana	Grunge; alternative rock	DGC	Brought grunge and alternative rock to a mainstream audience, and is regarded as having initiated a resurgence of interest in punk culture among teenagers and young adults of Generation X.	Legacy
24 September 1991	The Low End Theory	A Tribe Called Quest	East Coast hip hop; alternative hip hop; jazz rap	Jive	Garnered recognition from music critics and writers as a milestone in alternative hip hop, and for Q-Tip's production, which advanced the development and exposure of jazz rap.	Accolades
24 September 1991	Blood Sugar Sex Magik	Red Hot Chili Peppers	Funk rock; alternative rock; funk metal; rap rock	Warner Bros.		Accolades
4 November 1991	Bandwagonesque	Teenage Fanclub	Alternative rock; power pop; jangle pop; noise pop	Creation Records; DGC		NME's "The 500 Greatest Albums Of All Time": No. 115; Colin Larkin's All Time Top 1000 Albums: No. 386; Uncut's "The 500 Greatest Albums of the 1990s": No. 13; Spin's "The 300 Best Albums of the Past 30 Years (1985-2014)": No. 187
4 November 1991	Loveless	My Bloody Valentine	Shoegaze; noise pop; dream pop; neo-psychedelia; avant-rock; noise rock	Creation	Widely praised by critics for its sonic innovations and session leader Kevin Shields' "virtual reinvention of the guitar".	Accolades
18 November 1991	Achtung Baby	U2	Alternative rock	Island		Legacy

=== 1992 ===
Release Date	Album	Artist	Genre(s)	Label	Notes	Accolades
6 January 1992	Little Earthquakes	Tori Amos	Singer-songwriter	Atlantic (US); East West (Europe)	Regarded as having shaped the female singer-songwriter movement of the '90s.	Legacy
10 February 1992	Generation Terrorists	Manic Street Preachers	Glam rock; hard rock; punk rock; glam punk; glam metal; alternative rock	Columbia		NME's "The 500 Greatest Albums Of All Time": No. 461; Uncut's "The 500 Greatest Albums of the 1990s": No. 64; Q's "In Our Lifetime: Q's 100 Best Albums 1986–94": #77; Classic Rock's Greatest Albums of the 90's: No. 36
25 February 1992	Vulgar Display of Power	Pantera	Groove metal	Atco	It is considered one of the heaviest albums.	Legacy and accolades
9 March 1992	Going Blank Again	Ride	Shoegaze; psychedelic rock	Creation/Sire	Considered "predictive" of later genres of indie rock.	NME's "The 500 Greatest Albums Of All Time": No. 407; Uncut's "The 500 Greatest Albums of the 1990s": No. 147; Ned Raggett's Top Albums of the 90s: No. 108; Pitchfork's 50 Best Shoegaze Albums of All Time
24 March 1992	3 Years, 5 Months and 2 Days in the Life Of...	Arrested Development	Alternative hip-hop	Chrysalis/EMI		Robert Dimery's 1001 Albums You Must Hear Before You Die; Tom Moon's 1,000 Recordings to Hear Before You Die; Uncut's "The 500 Greatest Albums of the 1990s": No. 314; Select's Best Albums of the 90s: No. 55
30 March 1992	Lazer Guided Melodies	Spiritualized	Dream pop; space rock; shoegaze	Dedicated	Regarded as having anticipated dream pop.	NME's "The 500 Greatest Albums Of All Time": No. 342; Uncut's "The 500 Greatest Albums of the 1990s": No. 108; Robert Dimery's 1001 Albums You Must Hear Before You Die; Ned Raggett's Top Albums of the 90s: No. 23
30 March 1992	Dry	PJ Harvey	Alternative rock; indie rock; blues rock; post-punk	Too Pure		NME's "The 500 Greatest Albums Of All Time": No. 151; Uncut's "The 500 Greatest Albums of the 1990s": No. 208; Robert Dimery's 1001 Albums You Must Hear Before You Die; Treble's Top 100 Albums of the ’90s
20 April 1992	Slanted and Enchanted	Pavement	Indie rock; lo-fi; noise pop	Matador		Accolades
21 April 1992	Check Your Head	Beastie Boys	Alternative rock; rap rock; hip hop; progressive rap	Grand Royal; Capitol		Critical reception
21 April 1992	Wish	The Cure	Alternative rock; gothic rock; jangle pop; shoegaze	Fiction		Uncut's "The 500 Greatest Albums of the 1990s": No. 97; Colin Larkin's All Time Top 1000 Albums: No. 646; Q's "In Our Lifetime: Q's 100 Best Albums 1986–94"; Classic Rock and Metal Hammer's 200 Greatest Albums of the 90s
12 May 1992	The Southern Harmony And Musical Companion	The Black Crowes	Blues rock	Def American		Classic Rock's Greatest Albums of the 90's: No. 10; Uncut's "The 500 Greatest Albums of the 1990s": No. 114; Rock Hard magazine's The 500 Greatest Rock & Metal Albums of All Time: No. 477; Guitar World magazine's Greatest 100 Guitar Albums of All Time: #100
2 June 1992	It's a Shame About Ray	The Lemonheads	Grunge; alternative rock; jangle rock	Atlantic		NME's "The 500 Greatest Albums Of All Time": No. 308; Uncut's "The 500 Greatest Albums of the 1990s": No. 58; Robert Dimery's 1001 Albums You Must Hear Before You Die; Pause & Play's "The 90s Top 100 Essential Albums": No. 11
8 June 1992	Angel Dust	Faith No More	Alternative metal; avant-garde metal	Slash; Reprise		Critical reception and legacy
7 July 1992	Images And Words	Dream Theater	Progressive metal	ATCO		Accolades
14 July 1992	Psalm 69: The Way to Succeed and the Way to Suck Eggs	Ministry	Industrial metal; thrash metal	Sire	It is considered one of the heaviest albums.	Robert Dimery's 1001 Albums You Must Hear Before You Die; Ned Raggett's Top Albums of the 90s: No. 97; Raw: 90 Essential Albums of the 90s; Kerrang: 100 Albums You Must Hear Before You Die: #37
21 July 1992	Dirty	Sonic Youth	Experimental rock	DGC		Robert Dimery's 1001 Albums You Must Hear Before You Die; NME's "The 500 Greatest Albums Of All Time": No. 347; Pitchfork's "The 100 Best Albums of the 1990s" (1999): No. 91; Uncut's "The 500 Greatest Albums of the 1990s": No. 91
27 July 1992	Your Arsenal	Morrissey	Glam rock; rockabilly; britpop	His Master's Voice; Sire/Reprise		Uncut's "The 500 Greatest Albums of the 1990s": No. 253; Robert Dimery's 1001 Albums You Must Hear Before You Die; Select's Best Albums of the 90s: No. 63; Alternative Press's "The 90 Greatest Albums of the 90s": No. 40
4 September 1992	Copper Blue	Sugar	Alternative rock; power pop	Rykodisc/Creation		NME's "The 500 Greatest Albums Of All Time": No. 357; Uncut's "The 500 Greatest Albums of the 1990s": No. 75; Spin's "The 300 Best Albums of the Past 30 Years (1985–2014)": No. 286; Robert Dimery's 1001 Albums You Must Hear Before You Die
8 September 1992	Bone Machine	Tom Waits	Experimental rock	Island	Often noted for its rough, stripped-down, percussion-heavy style, as well as its dark lyrical themes revolving around death and decay.	Critical reception Grammy for Best Alternative Music Album
29 September 1992	Dirt	Alice in Chains	Grunge; alternative metal	Columbia	Often considered as one of the most influential albums to the sludge metal subgenre.	Reception and legacy
5 October 1992	Automatic for the People	R.E.M.	Alternative rock; baroque pop; folk rock; chamber pop	Warner Bros.		Critical reception
26 October 1992	Love Deluxe	Sade	R&B; ambient; cool jazz; art pop; trip hop; chill-out	Epic		Rolling Stone's "The 500 Greatest Albums of All Time": No. 247; Pitchfork's "The 150 Best Albums of the 1990s": No. 116; Tom Moon's 1,000 Recordings to Hear Before You Die; Pause & Play's "The 90s Top 100 Essential Albums": No. 11
3 November 1992	Rage Against the Machine	Rage Against the Machine	Rap metal; funk metal; alternative metal; rap rock	Epic	It is considered one of the heaviest albums.	Critical reception
9 November 1992	Selected Ambient Works 85–92	Aphex Twin	Ambient techno; IDM; electronica; ambient	Apollo; R&S	Considered a classic, defining work of electronica and ambient techno.	Reception and legacy
24 November 1992	Bizarre Ride II The Pharcyde	The Pharcyde	Alternative hip hop; jazz rap; boom bap	Delicious Vinyl; EastWest	One of the first alternative rap acts on the West Coast to have wide appeal.	Rolling Stone's "The 500 Greatest Albums of All Time": No. 482; Spin's "The 300 Best Albums of the Past 30 Years (1985–2014)": No. 194; Pitchfork's "The 150 Best Albums of the 1990s": No. 114; Slant's "The 100 Best Albums of the 1990s": No. 99
15 December 1992	The Chronic	Dr. Dre	West Coast hip hop; gangsta rap; G-funk	Death Row; Interscope; Priority	Popularized the G-funk subgenre within gangsta rap, and is widely regarded as an album that re-defined West Coast hip hop.	Accolades

=== 1993 ===
Release Date	Album	Artist	Genre(s)	Label	Notes	Accolades
1 March 1993	Everybody Else Is Doing It, So Why Can't We?	The Cranberries	Alternative rock; indie pop; Irish folk; jangle pop; post-punk; dream pop	Island		Pitchfork's "The 150 Best Albums of the 1990s": No. 113; Pause & Play's "The 90s Top 100 Essential Albums": No. 11; Laut's List of Milestones; Musikexpress's Best Albums of the 90s: No. 38
29 March 1993	Suede	Suede	Britpop; alternative rock; glam rock	Nude	Often cited as one of the first Britpop records.	Accolades
26 April 1993	Rid of Me	PJ Harvey	Alternative rock; indie rock; punk blues; punk rock; grunge	Island		Accolades
24 May 1993	Orbital	Orbital	Techno; dance	Internal; FFRR		Accolades
24 May 1993	Red House Painters	Red House Painters	Slowcore; dream pop; folk rock	4AD	Praised extensively for its melancholic instrumentation and emotional depth.	Alternative Press's "The 90 Greatest Albums of the 90s": No. 20; Stylus's Top 200 Albums of All Time: #191; NME's 101 Albums to Hear Before You Die; The Guardian's List of Favourite Albums
1 June 1993	Souvlaki	Slowdive	Shoegaze; dream pop	Creation		Legacy
22 June 1993	Exile in Guyville	Liz Phair	Indie rock; lo-fi	Matador	Regarded as exceptional for its lo-fi sound and the emotional honesty of Phair's lyrics, inspiring several imitators.	Accolades
5 July 1993	Debut	Björk	Alternative dance; art pop; electropop; house	One Little Indian; Elektra	Credited as one of the first albums to introduce electronic music into mainstream pop.	Accolades
27 July 1993	Siamese Dream	The Smashing Pumpkins	Alternative rock; grunge; alternative metal; psychedelic rock; indie rock; Shoegaze; hard rock	Virgin	Regarded as one of the greatest alternative rock albums for its diverse musical influences and lyrical material considered unique relative to other contemporary releases.	Release, reception and legacy
10 August 1993	Transient Random-Noise Bursts with Announcements	Stereolab	Experimental rock; indie pop; post-rock; krautrock	Duophonic/Elektra		Uncut's "The 500 Greatest Albums of the 1990s": No. 81; Ned Raggett's Top Albums of the 90s: No. 85; Tom Moon's 1,000 Recordings to Hear Before You Die; Pitchfork's "The 100 Best Albums of the 1990s" (1999): No. 67
30 August 1993	Last Splash	The Breeders	Alternative rock; experimental; indie rock; noise pop; pop rock; surf rock; grunge	4AD/Elektra Records	Regarded as a significant album for alternative rock's crossover into the mainstream.	Accolades
6 September 1993	Wild Wood	Paul Weller	Rock	Go! Discs		Uncut's "The 500 Greatest Albums of the 1990s": No. 252; Robert Dimery's 1001 Albums You Must Hear Before You Die; The Guardian's 1000 Albums to Hear Before You Die; Sounds by Rolling Stone's Top 50 Albums from the 90s
21 September 1993	In Utero	Nirvana	Grunge; noise rock; alternative rock; punk rock	DGC	It is considered one of the heaviest and darkest albums.	Reappraisal
27 September 1993	Very	Pet Shop Boys	Synth-pop; dance-pop; techno	Parlophone		Uncut's "The 500 Greatest Albums of the 1990s": No. 105; Slant's "The 100 Best Albums of the 1990s": No. 99; Robert Dimery's 1001 Albums You Must Hear Before You Die; Ned Raggett's Top Albums of the 90s: No. 65
27 September 1993	So Tonight That I Might See	Mazzy Star	Dream Pop	Capitol Records		Critical Reception
5 October 1993	Gentlemen	The Afghan Whigs	Alternative rock; post-punk; hard rock; R&B; soul; grunge	Elektra	Critically considered to be among the best-written breakup albums.	Reception and legacy; Uncut's "The 500 Greatest Albums of the 1990s": No. 272; Spin's "The 300 Best Albums of the Past 30 Years (1985–2014)": No. 141
11 October 1993	Tindersticks	Tindersticks	Chamber pop	This Way Up		NME's "The 500 Greatest Albums Of All Time": No. 432; Rolling Stone Germany's "The 500 Greatest Albums of All Time": No. 107; Melody Maker's "All Time Top 100 Albums": No. 35; Uncut's "The 500 Greatest Albums of the 1990s": No. 90
19 October 1993	Vs.	Pearl Jam	Grunge; hard rock; alternative rock	Epic		Accolades
9 November 1993	Enter the Wu-Tang (36 Chambers)	Wu-Tang Clan	East Coast hip hop; hardcore hip hop	Loud; RCA	Served as a landmark release in the era of hip-hop known as the East Coast Renaissance.	Retrospect
9 November 1993	Midnight Marauders	A Tribe Called Quest	East Coast hip hop; alternative hip hop; jazz rap; psychedelic rap	Jive	Frequently credited as a contributor to a "second golden age" of hip hop in the mid-1990s, as well as the pinnacle of the Native Tongues movement.	Accolades
23 November 1993	Doggystyle	Snoop Dogg	West Coast hip hop; gangsta rap; G-funk	Death Row; Interscope; Atlantic	Regarded as having helped introduce the hip-hop subgenre of G-Funk to a mainstream audience, bringing forward West Coast hip-hop as a dominant force in the early-mid 1990s. Praised for the lyrical "realism" that Snoop Dogg delivers on the album and for his distinctive vocal flow.	Accolades
29 November 1993	Incunabula	Autechre	Techno; ambient techno; IDM	Warp		Fact's "The 100 Best Albums of the 1990s": No. 11; DJ Magazine's "The Top 50 Most Influential Dance Albums Ever": No. 34; Mixmag's "The 50 Most Influential Dance Music Albums of All Time"; Ondarock's Rock Milestones

=== 1994 ===
Release Date	Album	Artist	Genre(s)	Label	Notes	Accolades
24 January 1994	Dubnobasswithmyheadman	Underworld	Acid house; dub; techno	Junior Boy's Own		Uncut's "The 500 Greatest Albums of the 1990s": No. 66; Slant's "The 100 Best Albums of the 1990s": No. 87; Q's "90 Best Albums of the 1990s"; Pitchfork's "The 100 Best Albums of the 1990s" (1999): No. 93
1 February 1994	Dookie	Green Day	Punk rock; pop-punk; skate punk	Reprise	Considered pivotal in solidifying punk rock and pop-punk's mainstream popularity.	Accolades
14 February 1994	Hex	Bark Psychosis	Post-rock; ambient	Circa	The term "post-rock" was coined by music journalist Simon Reynolds in his review of the album for Mojo magazine.	Uncut's "The 500 Greatest Albums of the 1990s": No. 60; Ned Raggett's Top Albums of the 90s: No. 66; Porcys' "The 100 Best Albums of the 1990s": No. 62; Ondarock's Rock Milestones
14 February 1994	Crooked Rain, Crooked Rain	Pavement	Indie rock; alternative rock; folk rock; psychedelic rock	Matador		Legacy
18 February 1994	I Could Live in Hope	Low	Slowcore; dream pop	Vernon Yard	Helped to birth the genre known as slowcore due to its "unprecedent pace".	Legacy Uncut's "The 500 Greatest Albums of the 1990s": No. 122
28 February 1994	D. I. Go Pop	Disco Inferno	Post-rock; experimental rock; sampledelia	Rough Trade	Highly influential for its innovative production approach that incorporated found sound elements through extensive use of digital samplers and its advancement of post-rock as a genre, alongside five EPs released by the band also during the 90s.	Ned Raggett's Top Albums of the 90s: No. 5; Uncut's "The 500 Greatest Albums of the 1990s": No. 476; Fast 'n' Bulbous' "The 500 Best Albums Since 1965": No. 103; Rockdelux's Best 150 Albums of the 90s: No. 101
7 March 1994	Selected Ambient Works Volume II	Aphex Twin	Ambient; dark ambient; electronic; drone; minimalism	Warp	Was "a very early example of a record being anticipated, experienced, and, ultimately, analyzed in minute detail through online communication."	Paste's "The 300 Greatest Albums of All Time": No. 95; Uncut's "The 500 Greatest Albums of the 1990s": No. 362; Spin's "The 300 Best Albums of the Past 30 Years (1985–2014)": No. 146; Pitchfork's Top 100 Albums of the 1990s (2003): No. 83; Ned Raggett's Top Albums of the 90s: No. 109
8 March 1994	The Downward Spiral	Nine Inch Nails	Industrial rock; alternative rock; industrial metal	Nothing/Interscope	Regarded as one of the most important albums of the 1990s in part due to its abrasive and eclectic nature and dark themes. It is considered one of the heaviest and darkest albums.	Accolades
8 March 1994	Superunknown	Soundgarden	Grunge; alternative metal; heavy metal; hard rock	A&M		Accolades
14 March 1994	Vauxhall and I	Morrissey	Alternative rock	Parlophone (UK); Sire/Reprise (US)	It is considered one of the darkest albums.	NME's "The 500 Greatest Albums Of All Time": No. 375; Uncut's "The 500 Greatest Albums of the 1990s": No. 227; Q's "100 Greatest Albums Ever": No. 89; Robert Dimery's 1001 Albums You Must Hear Before You Die
12 April 1994	Live Through This	Hole	Alternative rock; grunge; punk rock	DGC		Reappraisal
18 April 1994	Let Love In	Nick Cave & The Bad Seeds	Post-punk; gothic rock	Mute		NME's "The 500 Greatest Albums Of All Time": No. 165; Uncut's "The 500 Greatest Albums of the 1990s": No. 83; Select's Best Albums of the 90s: No. 56; Laut's List of Milestone Albums
18 April 1994	His 'N' Hers	Pulp	Britpop	Island		NME's "The 500 Greatest Albums Of All Time": No. 282; Ned Raggett's Top Albums of the 90s: No. 119; Q's "100 Greatest Albums of the 1990s": No. 74; The Guardian's List of Favourite Albums
19 April 1994	Illmatic	Nas	East Coast hip hop; hardcore hip hop; alternative hip hop; jazz rap	Columbia	Regarded as a landmark album in East Coast hip hop, as one of the greatest and most influential hip hop albums of all time, and having significantly contributed to the revival of the New York City rap scene.	Accolades; Impact and legacy of Illmatic
25 April 1994	Parklife	Blur	Britpop	Food		Accolades
26 April 1994	Yank Crime	Drive Like Jehu	Post-hardcore; math rock; noise rock; post-punk; emo	Interscope; Headhunter; Swami	Regarded as a catalyst for the eclectic San Diego music scene and the emerging national emo scene of the 1990s.	Uncut's "The 500 Greatest Albums of the 1990s": No. 197; Treble's "Top 150 Albums of the 90s" No. 77; Robert Dimery's 1001 Albums You Must Hear Before You Die; LostatSea's "90 Albums of the 90s": No. 57
26 April 1994	American Recordings	Johnny Cash	Folk; country	American		Critical reception Uncut's "The 500 Greatest Albums of the 1990s": No. 27
10 May 1994	Diary	Sunny Day Real Estate	Emo; post-hardcore; indie rock; grunge	Sub Pop	Considered by many to be a defining emo album of the second wave, and key in the development of its subgenre, Midwest emo.	Spin's "The 300 Best Albums of the Past 30 Years (1985–2014)": No. 155; Pitchfork's "The 100 Best Albums of the 1990s" (1999): No. 76; Paste's "The 90 Best Albums of the 1990s": No. 58; Exclaim!'s "100 Records That Rocked 100 Issues of Exclaim!"
10 May 1994	Weezer	Weezer	Power pop; geek rock; pop-punk; alternative rock; indie rock; emo	DGC	Regarded as a formative influence on "melodic emo".	Accolades
13 May 1994	Catartica	Marlene Kuntz	Alternative rock; Noise rock; Grunge			Uncut's "The 500 Greatest Albums of the 1990s": No. 66; Slant's "The 100 Best Albums of the 1990s": No. 87; Q's "90 Best Albums of the 1990s"; Pitchfork's "The 100 Best Albums of the 1990s" (1999): No. 93
20 May 1994	Teenager of the Year	Frank Black	Alternative rock	4AD; Elektra		Pitchfork's Top 100 Albums of the 1990s (2003): No. 94; Sounds by Rolling Stone's Top 50 Albums from the 90s; Robert Dimery's 1001 Albums You Must Hear Before You Die; Strange Currencies' Top 100 Albums of the 1990s: No. 29
31 May 1994	Ill Communication	Beastie Boys	Hip hop; NYHC; jazz; funk	Grand Royal; Capitol		Critical reception
1 June 1994	76:14	Global Communication	Ambient; electronica; chillout; ambient house; downtempo	Dedicated		Uncut's "The 500 Greatest Albums of the 1990s": No. 171; The Guardian's 1000 Albums to Hear Before You Die; DJ Magazine's "The Top 50 Most Influential Dance Albums Ever": No. 22; Porcys' "The 100 Best Albums of the 1990s": No. 94
6 June 1994	Blade Runner	Vangelis	Electronic; new-age; ambient	East West (Europe) / Atlantic (USA)	Soundtrack for Ridley Scott's 1982 science-fiction noir film Blade Runner. Acclaimed as an influential work in the history of electronic music and as one of the greatest film soundtracks of all time.	Legacy
7 June 1994	Purple	Stone Temple Pilots	Grunge; hard rock; alternative rock; psychedelic rock	Atlantic		Legacy
21 June 1994	Bee Thousand	Guided by Voices	Indie rock; lo-fi; avant-pop; progressive pop	Scat	Hallmark album in the "lo-fi" genre.	Accolades
4 July 1994	Music for the Jilted Generation	The Prodigy	Techno; breakbeat hardcore; hardcore techno; rave	XL; Mute		NME's "The 500 Greatest Albums Of All Time": No. 155; Spin's "90 Greatest Albums of the '90s": No. 60; Melody Maker's "All Time Top 100 Albums": No. 36; Q's "100 Greatest Albums of the 1990s"
15 August 1994	Grace	Jeff Buckley	Alternative rock; folk rock; jazz-rock	Columbia		Accolades
22 August 1994	Dummy	Portishead	Trip hop	Go! Beat/London	It is considered one of the darkest albums.	Accolades
29 August 1994	Definitely Maybe	Oasis	Britpop; rock	Creation	Regarded as a cornerstone of the Britpop genre, and significant in revitalizing British pop/rock music in the 1990s.	Legacy
30 August 1994	The Holy Bible	Manic Street Preachers	Alternative rock; post-punk; hard rock; punk rock; gothic rock; glam punk	Epic	Considered to be among the darkest and heaviest albums due to its lyrical contents written by Richey Edwards as he was struggling with severe depression, alcohol abuse, self-harm and anorexia nervosa.	Legacy
13 September 1994	Ready to Die	The Notorious B.I.G.	Hip hop; East Coast hip hop	Bad Boy; Arista	Significant for revitalizing the East Coast hip hop scene.	Accolades
10 October 1994	Dog Man Star	Suede	Art rock; glam rock; alternative rock; Britpop	Nude		Accolades
24 October 1994	At Action Park	Shellac	Post-hardcore; math rock; noise rock	Touch and Go		Uncut's "The 500 Greatest Albums of the 1990s": No. 464; Fact's "The 100 Best Albums of the 1990s": No. 18; Ondarock's Rock Milestones; Visions' "The 100 Most Important Albums of the 90s": No. 66
1 November 1994	MTV Unplugged in New York	Nirvana	Alternative rock; acoustic rock; folk rock	DGC	Live album.	Retrospective
1 November 1994	Wildflowers	Tom Petty	Heartland rock; folk rock; blues rock	Warner Bros.		Rolling Stone's "The 500 Greatest Albums of All Time": No. 214; Uncut's "The 500 Greatest Albums of the 1990s": No. 157; Pitchfork's "The 150 Best Albums of the 1990s": No. 129; Ultimate Classic Rock's Top 90s Rock Albums
15 November 1994	CrazySexyCool	TLC	R&B; hip hop soul	LaFace; Arista		Accolades

=== 1995 ===
Release Date	Album	Artist	Genre(s)	Label	Notes	Accolades
30 January 1995	Leftism	Leftfield	Progressive house	Columbia	Praised as one of the first major album-length works of dance music.	Legacy Uncut's "The 500 Greatest Albums of the 1990s": No. 141
20 February 1995	Maxinquaye	Tricky	Trip hop; experimental; electronic; R&B; post-rock; British hip hop	4th & B'way	Regarded as a significant influence on electronica, underground hip hop and British hip hop, and a key release of the burgeoning trip hop genre.	Critical reception and legacy
27 February 1995	To Bring You My Love	PJ Harvey	Alternative rock; punk blues; blues rock	Island		Accolades
13 March 1995	The Bends	Radiohead	Alternative rock; indie rock; Britpop	Parlophone; Capitol		Accolades
March 1995	Elastica	Elastica	Britpop; post-punk	Deceptive (UK); DGC (US)		Legacy
4 April 1995	Alien Lanes	Guided By Voices	Indie rock; lo-fi; power pop	Matador		Pitchfork's Top 100 Albums of the 1990s (2003): No. 27; Uncut's "The 500 Greatest Albums of the 1990s": No. 374; Spin's "The 300 Best Albums of the Past 30 Years (1985–2014)": No. 126; Strange Currencies' Top 100 Albums of the 1990s: No. 36
11 April 1995	Wowee Zowee	Pavement	Indie rock; experimental rock	Matador		Rolling Stone's "The 500 Greatest Albums of All Time": No. 265; Uncut's "The 500 Greatest Albums of the 1990s": No. 106; Spin's "The 300 Best Albums of the Past 30 Years (1985–2014)": No. 153; Treble's Best Albums of the ’90s
25 April 1995	The Infamous	Mobb Deep	East Coast hip hop; gangsta rap; hardcore hip hop	BMG; RCA; Loud	Credited with helping to redefine the sound of hardcore hip hop, using its production style, which incorporated eerie piano loops, distorted synthesizers, eighth-note hi-hats, and sparse filtered basslines.	Accolades; Spin's "The 300 Best Albums of the Past 30 Years (1985–2014)": No. 205
15 May 1995	I Should Coco	Supergrass	Punk rock; Britpop; alternative rock; pop-punk	Parlophone (UK); Capitol (US); Echo/BMG (2018 reissue)		Uncut's "The 500 Greatest Albums of the 1990s": No. 159; Q's "100 Greatest Albums of the 1990s": No. 19; Strange Currencies' Top 100 Albums of the 1990s: No. 42; Robert Dimery's 1001 Albums You Must Hear Before You Die
29 May 1995	Grand Prix	Teenage Fanclub	Power pop; jangle pop; Britpop; folk rock; country rock	Creation; DGC		NME's "The 500 Greatest Albums Of All Time": No. 282; Uncut's "The 500 Greatest Albums of the 1990s": No. 84; Colin Larkin's All Time Top 1000 Albums: No. 624; Select's Best Albums of the 90s: No. 48
7 June 1995	Post	Björk	Art pop; avant-pop; experimental pop	One Little Indian; Elektra; Mother; Polydor	Considered an important exponent of art pop, and praised by critics for its ambition and timelessness.	Accolades
13 June 1995	Jagged Little Pill	Alanis Morissette	Alternative rock; post-grunge	Maverick; Reprise	Credited with leading to the introduction of several female singers such as Fiona Apple, Shakira, Tracy Bonham, Meredith Brooks, and in the early 2000s, Pink, Michelle Branch, and Avril Lavigne.	Impact and legacy
26 June 1995	Foo Fighters	Foo Fighters	Punk rock; grunge; alternative rock; melodic hardcore; post-grunge	Roswell; Capitol		Robert Dimery's 1001 Albums You Must Hear Before You Die; NME's "The 500 Greatest Albums Of All Time": No. 476; Select's Best Albums of the 90s: No. 97; Kerrang: 100 Albums You Must Hear Before You Die: #37
3 July 1995	Brown Sugar	D'Angelo	Neo soul; R&B; soul; funk	EMI		Rolling Stone's "The 500 Greatest Albums of All Time": No. 183; Robert Dimery's 1001 Albums You Must Hear Before You Die; Q's "100 Greatest Albums of the 1990s": No. 73; Uncut's "The 500 Greatest Albums of the 1990s": No. 115
1 August 1995	Only Built 4 Cuban Linx...	Raekwon	East Coast hip hop; mafioso rap	Loud/RCA	Widely regarded as a pioneer of the mafioso rap subgenre.	Rolling Stone's "The 500 Greatest Albums of All Time": No. 219; Uncut's "The 500 Greatest Albums of the 1990s": No. 377; Spin's "The 300 Best Albums of the Past 30 Years (1985–2014)": No. 154; Pitchfork's "The 150 Best Albums of the 1990s": No. 41
7 August 1995	Timeless	Goldie	Jungle; drum and bass	FFRR	Widely regarded as a groundbreaking release in the history of drum and bass music.	Uncut's "The 500 Greatest Albums of the 1990s": No. 220; Treble's "Top 150 Albums of the 90s" No. 138; Fact's "The 100 Best Albums of the 1990s": No. 35; Visions' "The 100 Most Important Albums of the 90s": No. 53
15 August 1995	Garbage	Garbage	Alternative rock; dance-rock; power pop	Almo	Highly regarded for its unique production incorporating several genres of rock and electronic music together.	Pitchfork's "The 150 Best Albums of the 1990s": No. 121; Robert Dimery's 1001 Albums You Must Hear Before You Die; The Guardian's 100 Best Albums Ever: #71; Musikexpress's Best Albums of the 90s: No. 43
26 September 1995	Wrecking Ball	Emmylou Harris	Alternative country; Americana; country rock; dream pop	Asylum/Elektra		Uncut's "The 500 Greatest Albums of the 1990s": No. 28; Paste's "The 90 Best Albums of the 1990s": No. 31; Classic Rock's Greatest Albums of the 90's: No. 83; 1996 Grammy Award for Best Contemporary Folk Recording
2 October 1995	(What's the Story) Morning Glory?	Oasis	Britpop; rock	Creation		Legacy
24 October 1995	Mellon Collie and the Infinite Sadness	The Smashing Pumpkins	Alternative rock; grunge; alternative metal; art rock; heavy metal	Virgin	Widely lauded for its 28-song scope and wide array of musical styles.	Accolades
30 October 1995	Different Class	Pulp	Britpop; art rock; pop	Island		Accolades
6 November 1995	Tri Repetae	Autechre	Electronic; IDM; ambient	Warp		Stylus's Top 200 Albums of All Time: #121; Mixmag's "The 50 Most Influential Dance Music Albums of All Time"; Treble's "Top 150 Albums of the 90s": #136; Musikexpress's Best Albums of the 90s: #49
7 November 1995	Liquid Swords	GZA/Genius	East Coast hip hop; hardcore hip hop	Geffen	Highly regarded for its complex lyricism.	Accolades
1995	94diskont.	Oval	Glitch; ambient	Mille Plateaux/Thrill Jockey	Praised for its glitch music styling methods involving literally deconstructing music and digital audio by using exacto knives, paint, and tape to damage the surfaces of compact discs to stitch back together.	Pitchfork's "The 150 Best Albums of the 1990s": No. 132; Fact's "The 100 Best Albums of the 1990s": No. 21; Porcys' "The 100 Best Albums of the 1990s": No. 50; Groove's "The 100 Best Electronic Albums of the past 25 Years" No. 96

=== 1996 ===
Release Date	Album	Artist	Genre(s)	Label	Notes	Accolades
30 January 1996	Millions Now Living Will Never Die	Tortoise	Post-rock; jazz fusion	Thrill Jockey	Renowned as a groundbreaking album for the post-rock genre.	Uncut's "The 500 Greatest Albums of the 1990s": No. 70; Fact's "The 100 Best Albums of the 1990s": No. 28; LostatSea's "90 Albums of the 90s": No. 54; Visions' "The 100 Most Important Albums of the 90s": No. 54
5 February 1996	Murder Ballads	Nick Cave	Alternative rock; Singer-songwriter	Mute		NME's "The 500 Greatest Albums Of All Time": No. 235; Rolling Stone Australia's "200 Greatest Australian Albums of All Time": No. 13; Robert Dimery's 1001 Albums You Must Hear Before You Die; 33 1/3 #151 (978-1-5013-5514-1)
13 February 1996	All Eyez On Me	2Pac	West Coast hip hop; gangsta rap; G-funk	Death Row/Interscope	The first ever double-full-length hip-hop solo studio album released for mass consumption globally.	Accolades
13 February 1996	The Score	Fugees	East Coast hip hop; alternative hip hop; progressive rap	Ruffhouse/Columbia		Accolades
11 March 1996	Second Toughest in the Infants	Underworld	Electronic; techno; progressive house; breakbeat; ambient; downtempo; experimental	Junior Boy's Own		Uncut's "The 500 Greatest Albums of the 1990s": No. 109; Visions' "The 100 Most Important Albums of the 90s": No. 76; Robert Dimery's 1001 Albums You Must Hear Before You Die; Q's "100 Greatest Albums of the 1990s": No. 38
18 March 1996	Emperor Tomato Ketchup	Stereolab	Experimental pop; post-rock	Duophonic; Elektra		Critical reception and legacy
29 April 1996	In Sides	Orbital	Ambient techno	Internal/FFRR		Spin's "The 300 Best Albums of the Past 30 Years (1985–2014)": No. 217; Musikexpress's Best Albums of the 90s: No. 47; Uncut's "The 500 Greatest Albums of the 1990s": No. 461; Q's "90 Best Albums of the 1990s"
20 May 1996	Everything Must Go	Manic Street Preachers	Rock; Britpop; hard rock	Epic		Legacy
20 May 1996	Fuzzy Logic	Super Furry Animals	Art rock; Britpop; glam rock; psychedelia; punk rock	Creation		NME's "The 500 Greatest Albums Of All Time": No. 245; Robert Dimery's 1001 Albums You Must Hear Before You Die; Q's "100 Greatest Albums of the 1990s": No. 30; Uncut's "The 500 Greatest Albums of the 1990s": No. 243
18 June 1996	Odelay	Beck	Alternative rock; sampledelia; alternative hip hop; experimental rock; folk rock; neo-psychedelia	DGC; Bong Load		Legacy
25 June 1996	Reasonable Doubt	Jay-Z	East Coast hip hop; mafioso rap	Roc-A-Fella/Priority	Regarded as one of the greatest albums of New York's hip-hop renaissance of the '90s", and instrumental in transfiguring gangsta rap into mafioso rap.	Legacy and influence
6 August 1996	Music from the Unrealized Film Script: Dusk at Cubist Castle	The Olivia Tremor Control	Indie pop; neo-psychedelia; psychedelic pop	Flydaddy	74-minute double album comprising 27 songs.	Pitchfork's Top 100 Albums of the 1990s (2003): No. 39; Uncut's "The 500 Greatest Albums of the 1990s": No. 87; Fact's "The 100 Best Albums of the 1990s": No. 98; Strange Currencies' Top 100 Albums of the 1990s: No. 25
13 August 1996	Beautiful Freak	Eels	Alternative rock	DreamWorks		NME's "The 500 Greatest Albums Of All Time": No. 344; Colin Larkin's All Time Top 1000 Albums: No. 666; Robert Dimery's 1001 Albums You Must Hear Before You Die; Rolling Stone's "The 100 Best Albums of the 90s": No. 44
27 August 1996	ATLiens	Outkast	Southern hip hop; alternative hip hop	LaFace/Arista		Legacy
9 September 1996	New Adventures in Hi-Fi	R.E.M.	Folk rock; jangle pop	Warner Bros.		Awards Uncut's "The 500 Greatest Albums of the 1990s": No. 330
16 September 1996	Endtroducing.....	DJ Shadow	Instrumental hip hop; trip hop; plunderphonics; sampledelia	Mo' Wax	Considered a landmark recording in the development of instrumental hip hop. Cited by Guinness World Records as the first album created entirely from samples.	Legacy
17 September 1996	Ænima	Tool	Alternative metal; progressive metal	Zoo; Volcano		Treble's "Top 150 Albums of the 90s" No. 107; Kerrang!'s "50 Most Influential Albums Of All Time": No. 6; Rolling Stone's "The 100 Greatest Metal Albums of All Time": No. 18; Classic Rock and Metal Hammer's 200 Greatest Albums of the 90s
24 September 1996	Pinkerton	Weezer	Alternative rock; emo; power pop; pop-punk; indie rock	DGC		Accolades
8 October 1996	Antichrist Superstar	Marilyn Manson	Industrial metal; industrial rock; alternative metal; gothic rock	Nothing; Interscope	It is considered one of the heaviest albums.	Accolades
22 October 1996	Soundtracks for the Blind	Swans	Experimental; post-rock; drone	Young God		Critical reception Paste's "The 300 Greatest Albums of All Time": No. 175
25 October 1996	Long Season	Fishmans	Indie rock; Dream pop; Ambient pop; Neo-psychedelia	Polydor	Consists of a single 35-minute composition based on the band's earlier single "Season". Regarded as a landmark of Japanese rock music.	Paste's "The 300 Greatest Albums of All Time": No. 4; Treble's "Top 150 Albums of the 90s" No. 131; Strange Currencies' Top 100 Albums of the 1990s: No. 20; Music Magazine (Japan)'s "The 100 Best Japanese Albums of the 90s"
29 October 1996	Being There	Wilco	Alt-country; country rock	Reprise		Reception
4 November 1996	Richard D. James Album	Aphex Twin	IDM; drill 'n' bass; electronica; jungle; experimental; pop	Warp	Highly regarded for its production, incorporating fast breakbeats and intricate drum programming, lush string arrangements, ambient melodies, modulated vocals, and unstable time signatures.	Critical reception Uncut's "The 500 Greatest Albums of the 1990s": No. 246
18 November 1996	If You're Feeling Sinister	Belle and Sebastian	Chamber pop; chamber folk; indie rock; indie pop; twee pop	Jeepster		Critical reception

=== 1997 ===
Release Date	Album	Artist	Genre(s)	Label	Notes	Accolades
28 January 1997	Perfect from Now On	Built to Spill	Indie rock; psychedelic rock; art rock; post-rock; Midwest emo; alternative rock	Warner Bros.	Stylistically, the album was marked by its experimentation with longer song structures and philosophical lyrics.	Paste's "The 300 Greatest Albums of All Time": No. 202; Pitchfork's Top 100 Albums of the 1990s (2003): No. 22; Uncut's "The 500 Greatest Albums of the 1990s": No. 125; Strange Currencies' Top 100 Albums of the 1990s: No. 74
10 February 1997	Blur	Blur	Indie rock; lo-fi; alternative rock; art rock; experimental rock	Food		NME's "The 500 Greatest Albums Of All Time": No. 137; Robert Dimery's 1001 Albums You Must Hear Before You Die; Classic Rock and Metal Hammer's 200 Greatest Albums of the 90s; Treble's Best Albums of the ’90s
11 February 1997	Baduizm	Erykah Badu	R&B; neo soul; jazz; hip hop	Kedar; Universal	Credited with contributing to the commercial visibility of neo-soul.	Accolades
25 February 1997	Either/Or	Elliott Smith	Indie folk; indie rock; lo-fi; Americana	Kill Rock Stars		Legacy
3 March 1997	The Boatman's Call	Nick Cave & The Bad Seeds	Singer-songwriter	Mute/Reprise		NME's "The 500 Greatest Albums Of All Time": No. 257; Uncut's "The 500 Greatest Albums of the 1990s": No. 51; Robert Dimery's 1001 Albums You Must Hear Before You Die; 100 Best Australian Albums: No. 26
18 March 1997	Whatever and Ever Amen	Ben Folds Five	Alternative rock	550; Caroline; Epic		Australia Broadcasting Company's Top 100: No. 91; Uncut's "The 500 Greatest Albums of the 1990s": No. 418; Paste's "The 90 Best Albums of the 1990s": No. 44; Musikexpress's Best Albums of the 90s: No. 44
7 April 1997	Dig Your Own Hole	The Chemical Brothers	Big beat; electronica; breakbeat; psychedelic rock	Freestyle Dust/Virgin (UK)		Critical reception and legacy
8 April 1997	Dig Me Out	Sleater-Kinney	Punk rock	Kill Rock Stars	Acclaimed for its energy and feminist lyrics.	Legacy
22 April 1997	I Can Hear the Heart Beating as One	Yo La Tengo	Indie rock; indie pop; noise pop	Matador		Legacy
21 May 1997	OK Computer	Radiohead	Alternative rock; art rock	Parlophone; Capitol	Cited as one of the greatest albums of all time for its anticipation of the mood of 21st-century life's rampant consumerism, capitalism, social alienation, paranoia, and political malaise and its influence in pushing British rock from Britpop towards melancholic, atmospheric alternative rock. It is considered one of the darkest albums.	Accolades
16 June 1997	Ladies and Gentlemen We Are Floating in Space	Spiritualized	Space rock; neo-psychedelia; shoegaze; gospel	Dedicated		Legacy
30 June 1997	The Fat of the Land	The Prodigy	Big beat; electropunk; electronic rock; techno; electronica; dance-rock	XL; Maverick		Reception
14 August 1997 (CD Version: June 8, 1998)	F♯ A♯ ∞	Godspeed You! Black Emperor	Post-rock	Constellation; Kranky	Notable for being devoid of traditional lyrics and is mostly instrumental, featuring lengthy songs segmented into movements.	Pitchfork's "The 150 Best Albums of the 1990s": No. 85; Exclaim!'s "100 Records That Rocked 100 Issues of Exclaim!"; Treble's "Top 150 Albums of the 90s" No. 32; Strange Currencies' Top 100 Albums of the 1990s: No. 56
16 September 1997	Buena Vista Social Club	Buena Vista Social Club	Son cubano; bolero; descarga; danzón; guajira; criolla; jazz	World Circuit; Nonesuch	Recognized by the Guinness World Records as the best-selling world music album.	Reception
22 September 1997	Dots and Loops	Stereolab	Art pop; experimental pop; post-rock; lounge; easy listening	Duophonic/Elektra	Praised for its blend of accessible bossa nova and 1960s pop music-inspired music with experimental and avant-garde sounds, and for being one of the first albums produced with a digital audio workstation.	Uncut's "The 500 Greatest Albums of the 1990s": No. 119; Treble's "Top 150 Albums of the 90s" No. 59; Pitchfork's "The 100 Best Albums of the 1990s" (1999): No. 90; LostatSea's "90 Albums of the 90s": No. 69
22 September 1997	Homogenic	Björk	Electronica; trip hop; art pop; experimental	One Little Indian; Elektra; Mother; Polydor	Regarded as one of the most groundbreaking albums of all-time, and is often credited for connecting art pop to electronic dance music.	Accolades
29 September 1997	Urban Hymns	The Verve	Britpop; indie rock; orchestral rock; psychedelia; post-Britpop	Hut		Accolades and legacy
30 September 1997	Time Out of Mind	Bob Dylan	Blues rock; country; blues; rockabilly	Columbia		Aftermath and legacy
7 October 1997	The Velvet Rope	Janet Jackson	R&B; pop	Virgin	Regarded as a template for pop artists transitioning to a darker or rebellious sound and as a precursor to the development of alternative R&B.	Accolades
21 October 1997	Mogwai Young Team	Mogwai	Post-rock; noise rock; instrumental rock	Chemikal Underground		NME's "The 500 Greatest Albums Of All Time": No. 177; Ned Raggett's Top Albums of the 90s: No. 7; Pitchfork's Top 100 Albums of the 1990s (2003): No. 97; Ondarock's Rock Milestones
18 November 1997	The Lonesome Crowded West	Modest Mouse	Indie rock	Up		Critical reception Paste's "The 300 Greatest Albums of All Time": No. 300

=== 1998 ===
Release Date	Album	Artist	Genre(s)	Label	Notes	Accolades
16 January 1998	Moon Safari	Air	Space pop; electronica; lounge; chill-out; downtempo; dream pop; psychedelia	Source; Virgin	Credited with helping to establish the stage for the budding downtempo music style.	Accolades
26 January 1998	Mark Hollis	Mark Hollis	Post-rock; art rock; folk; baroque pop; jazz	Polydor	Noted for being extremely sparse and minimal in its sound; AllMusic called it "quite possibly the most quiet and intimate record ever made".	Rolling Stone (Germany)'s "The 500 Greatest Albums of All Time": No. 234; Weiner's 100 Best Records of the Century: #99; Uncut's "The 500 Greatest Albums of the 1990s": No. 96; Ned Raggett's Top Albums of the 90s: No. 131
10 February 1998	In the Aeroplane Over the Sea	Neutral Milk Hotel	Indie rock; psychedelic folk; lo-fi	Merge	Highly regarded for its hard-to-categorize mix of genres, use of less conventional instruments like the singing saw and uilleann pipes, its lo-fi production, and its surrealistic and opaque lyrics inspired by Anne Frank's The Diary of a Young Girl. Notable for developing a substantial cult following. It is considered one of the darkest albums.	Critical reevaluation and sales
22 February 1998	Ray of Light	Madonna	Electronica; trip hop; techno-pop; new-age	Maverick; Warner Bros.	Credited for bringing electronica music into global pop culture.	Accolades
10 March 1998	TNT	Tortoise	Post-rock; jazz-rock; dub; minimal; krautrock; exotica	Thrill Jockey	Critically acclaimed for its postmodern sound using hard disk technology in a "forward-then-back" approach, with members individually adding parts to tracks at different stages until the tracks were completed.	Critical reception Uncut's "The 500 Greatest Albums of the 1990s": No. 139
30 March 1998	This Is Hardcore	Pulp	Art rock; glam rock; Britpop	Island	It is considered one of the darkest albums.	Reception and legacy Diariocrítico's The 100 Best Albums of the 90s: No. 69
20 April 1998	Music Has the Right to Children	Boards of Canada	Electronic; downtempo; ambient; IDM; trip hop; psychedelia	Warp; Skam; music70; Matador	Noted as a major influence on the electronic music genre, using vintage synthesisers, degraded analogue production, found sounds and samples, and hip hop-inspired rhythms in its production.	Legacy and influence NME's "The 500 Greatest Albums Of All Time": No. 181
20 April 1998	Mezzanine	Massive Attack	Trip hop; electronica	Virgin; Circa	Praised for its darker aesthetic and more atmospheric style influenced by British post-punk, industrial music, hip hop and dub music.	Reception
23 June 1998	Mermaid Avenue	Billy Bragg & Wilco	Alt-country; folk rock	Elektra		Uncut's "The 500 Greatest Albums of the 1990s": No. 350; Paste's "The 90 Best Albums of the 1990s": No. 40; Strange Currencies' Top 100 Albums of the 1990s: No. 57; Robert Dimery's 1001 Albums You Must Hear Before You Die
30 June 1998	Car Wheels on a Gravel Road	Lucinda Williams	Americana; alternative country; country rock	Mercury	Credited with popularizing Americana music.	Critical reception and legacy
19 August 1998	The Miseducation of Lauryn Hill	Lauryn Hill	Neo soul; R&B; hip hop; hip hop soul; reggae; progressive rap	Ruffhouse; Columbia	Contributed to bringing hip hop and neo soul to the forefront of popular music, and regarded as among the best hip-hop albums of all time.	Accolades
25 August 1998	XO	Elliott Smith	Alternative rock; art pop; baroque pop; chamber pop; indie folk; indie rock	DreamWorks		Spin's "The 300 Best Albums of the Past 30 Years (1985–2014)": No. 133; Strange Currencies' Top 100 Albums of the 1990s: No. 43; Pitchfork's Top 100 Albums of the 1990s (2003): No. 68; 33 1/3 #63 (ISBN 978-0-8264-2900-1)
21 September 1998	Electro-Shock Blues	Eels	Indie rock	DreamWorks	Acclaimed for its representation of frontman Mark Oliver "E" Everett's personal losses and coming to terms with suddenly becoming the only living member of his family.	NME's "The 500 Greatest Albums Of All Time": No. 418; Diariocrítico's The 100 Best Albums of the 90s: No. 91; The Guardian's List of Favourite Albums; Ondarock's Rock Milestones
28 September 1998	The Three E.P.'s	The Beta Band	Folk rock; post-rock; experimental pop	Regal	Compilation album.	Pitchfork's Top 100 Albums of the 1990s (2003): No. 23; Uncut's "The 500 Greatest Albums of the 1990s": No. 124; Paste's "The 90 Best Albums of the 1990s": No. 56; Exclaim!'s "100 Records That Rocked 100 Issues of Exclaim!"
29 September 1998	Deserter's Songs	Mercury Rev	Chamber pop; Americana	V2		NME's "The 500 Greatest Albums Of All Time": No. 152; Uncut's "The 500 Greatest Albums of the 1990s": No. 53; Exclaim!'s "100 Records That Rocked 100 Issues of Exclaim!"; Robert Dimery's 1001 Albums You Must Hear Before You Die
29 September 1998	Aquemini	Outkast	Hip hop; alternative hip hop; G-funk	LaFace/Arista	Praised for being one of the most creative rap albums for its musicality, eclectic sound, and unique lyrical themes.	Accolades
29 September 1998	Mos Def & Talib Kweli Are Black Star	Black Star	East Coast hip hop; alternative hip hop; conscious rap; underground hip hop; progressive rap	Rawkus; Priority; EMI; MCA; Universal		Spin's "The 300 Best Albums of the Past 30 Years (1985–2014)": No. 178; Tom Moon's 1,000 Recordings to Hear Before You Die.; The Guardian's List of Favourite Albums; Treble's Best Albums of the ’90s
September 1996	Horse Stories	Dirty Three	Post-rock; folk rock	Touch and Go		The Australian's Best 52 Albums; Magnet magazine's Top 60 Albums 1993–2003: No. 18; Fast 'n' Bulbous' "The Best Albums Since 1965": No. 779; Exclaim!'s "100 Records That Rocked 100 Issues of Exclaim!"
12 October 1998	Without You I'm Nothing	Placebo	Alternative rock; glam rock	Hut		Reception
20 October 1998	American Water	Silver Jews	Indie rock; country rock	Drag City		Uncut's "The 500 Greatest Albums of the 1990s": No. 128; Pitchfork's "The 150 Best Albums of the 1990s": No. 21; Treble's "Top 150 Albums of the 90s" No. 77; The Guardian's 1000 Albums to Hear Before You Die
27 October 1998	The Shape of Punk to Come	Refused	Hardcore punk; post-hardcore	Burning Heart	Incorporated experimental combinations of post-hardcore, post-punk, techno, and jazz sounds into its punk framework.	Kerrang!'s "50 Most Influential Albums Of All Time": No. 13; Treble's "Top 150 Albums of the 90s" No. 99; Visions' "The 100 Most Important Albums of the 90s": No. 29; Rock Hard magazine's The 500 Greatest Rock & Metal Albums of All Time: No. 428

=== 1999 ===
Release Date	Album	Artist	Genre(s)	Label	Notes	Accolades
19 January 1999	I See a Darkness	Bonnie 'Prince' Billy	Indie folk; gothic folk; country folk	Palace/Domino		Paste's "The 300 Greatest Albums of All Time": No. 287; Uncut's "The 500 Greatest Albums of the 1990s": No. 151; Treble's "Top 150 Albums of the 90s" No. 101; Strange Currencies' Top 100 Albums of the 1990s: No. 83
2 February 1999	Keep It Like A Secret	Built To Spill	Indie rock; alternative rock; dream pop	Up; Warner Bros.		Uncut's "The 500 Greatest Albums of the 1990s": No. 413; Spin's "The 300 Best Albums of the Past 30 Years (1985–2014)": No. 119; Pitchfork's "The 150 Best Albums of the 1990s": No. 101; LostatSea's "90 Albums of the 90s": No. 24
23 February 1999	Things Fall Apart	The Roots	East Coast hip hop; alternative hip hop; jazz rap; progressive rap	MCA		Rolling Stone's "The 500 Greatest Albums of All Time": No. 416; Pitchfork's "The 150 Best Albums of the 1990s": No. 77; Slant's "The 100 Best Albums of the 1990s": No. 32; Paste's "The 90 Best Albums of the 1990s": No. 45
23 February 1999	The Slim Shady LP	Eminem	Hip hop; horrorcore; comedy hip hop	Aftermath; WEB; Interscope	Praised for its unique lyrical style, dark humor lyrics involving cartoonish depictions of violence and heavy use of profanity, and unusual personality.	Accolades
9 March 1999	Summerteeth	Wilco	Alt-country; chamber pop; orchestral pop; pop rock; power pop; psychedelic pop	Reprise		Uncut's "The 500 Greatest Albums of the 1990s": No. 118; Spin's "The 300 Best Albums of the Past 30 Years (1985-2014)": No. 193; Pitchfork's "The 150 Best Albums of the 1990s": No. 102; Tom Moon's 1,000 Recordings to Hear Before You Die.
15 March 1999	13	Blur	Art rock; experimental rock; alternative rock	Food; Parlophone		Accolades
16 April 1999	Mule Variations	Tom Waits	Experimental rock; blues	ANTI-		Rolling Stone's The 500 Greatest Albums of All Time (2003): No. 416; Pitchfork's "The 100 Best Albums of the 1990s" (1999): No. 57; Mojo's "The 100 Greatest Albums of Our Lifetime": No. 21; Grammy Award for Best Contemporary Folk Album at the 42nd Grammy Awards
17 May 1999	The Soft Bulletin	The Flaming Lips	Neo-psychedelia; psychedelic rock; symphonic pop; symphonic rock; art rock; alternative rock; dream pop	Warner Bros.		NME's "The 500 Greatest Albums Of All Time": No. 102; Uncut's "The 500 Greatest Albums of the 1990s": No. 37; Pitchfork's "The 150 Best Albums of the 1990s": No. 99; Slant's "The 100 Best Albums of the 1990s": No. 66
17 May 1999	Play	Moby	Electronica; downtempo; techno; ambient; breakbeat; roots; blues; electropop	Mute; V2		Critical reception
24 May 1999	The Man Who	Travis	Post-Britpop	Independiente		Legacy; Best Album at the 2000 Brit Awards; Q's "100 Greatest Albums Ever": No. 89
8 June 1999	Californication	Red Hot Chili Peppers	Alternative rock; funk rock	Warner Bros.		Retrospective commentary Uncut's "The 500 Greatest Albums of the 1990s": No. 224
12 June 1999	Ágætis Byrjun	Sigur Rós	Post-rock; dream pop; ambient; chamber pop	Fat Cat; Smekkleysa	Highly regarded for its "cosmic", "other-worldly" and "timeless" nature due to the unique sound of the band's music.	Reception
28 June 1999	Bocanada	Gustavo Cerati	Art pop; trip hop; downtempo; neo-psychedelia	BMG International	Regarded as one of the greatest Argentine and Latin-American rock albums of all time.	Treble's "Top 150 Albums of the 90s" No. 147; Rolling Stone's "The 50 Best Latin-American Rock Albums": No. 2; The 600 from Latin America: #67; Latin Times' "Top 35 Latin American Alternative Albums Of All Time": No. 1
14 September 1999	69 Love Songs	The Magnetic Fields	Indie pop; indie folk; synth-pop; chamber pop	Merge	A three-volume concept album composed of 69 love songs.	Critical reception
14 September 1999	American Football	American Football	Midwest emo; indie rock; math rock; post-rock	Polyvinyl	Considered one of the most important math rock and Midwest emo records of the 1990s.	Paste's "The 300 Greatest Albums of All Time": No. 206; Pitchfork's "The 150 Best Albums of the 1990s": No. 138; Treble's "Top 150 Albums of the 90s" No. 48; Rolling Stone's 40 Greatest Emo Albums of All Time: #6
21 September 1999	The Fragile	Nine Inch Nails	Industrial rock; art rock; alternative rock	Nothing; Interscope	Acclaimed for its ambition and composition incorporating vast influences and genres.	Slant's "The 100 Best Albums of the 1990s": No. 90; Rock Hard magazine's The 500 Greatest Rock & Metal Albums of All Time: No. 341; Classic Rock and Metal Hammer's 200 Greatest Albums of the 90s; Visions' "300 Albums for Eternity": No. 64
12 October 1999	Black On Both Sides	Mos Def	East Coast hip hop	Rawkus/Priority		Pitchfork's "The 150 Best Albums of the 1990s": No. 30; Slant's "The 100 Best Albums of the 1990s": No. 60; Tom Moon's 1,000 Recordings to Hear Before You Die.; Laut's List of Milestone Albums
19 October 1999	Operation: Doomsday	MF Doom	Underground hip hop; alternative hip hop; lo-fi hip hop	Fondle 'Em	Regarded as one of the most influential albums in independent and underground hip-hop history.	Accolades
26 October 1999	Emergency & I	The Dismemberment Plan	Indie rock; art punk; post-punk; pop	DeSoto; Barsuk (2011 reissue)	Regarded as a landmark indie rock album and influential to its development.	Accolades and retrospective reviews
2 November 1999	The Battle Of Los Angeles	Rage Against The Machine	Rap metal; funk metal	Epic		Critical reception
9 November 1999	When The Pawn...	Fiona Apple	Alternative pop	Epic; Clean Slate		When the Pawn...
10 December 1999	Vision Creation Newsun	Boredoms	Space rock; krautrock; neo-psychedelia	Birdman/WEA Japan		Uncut's "The 500 Greatest Albums of the 1990s": No. 333; Strange Currencies' Top 100 Albums of the 1990s: No. 65; Pitchfork's List of the 200 Best Albums of the 2000s: No. 39; The Guardian's 1000 Albums to Hear Before You Die

== See also ==
- List of 1960s albums considered the best
- List of 1970s albums considered the best
- List of 1980s albums considered the best
- List of best-selling albums
- List of fastest-selling albums

== Sources ==
- Ankeny, Jason (n.d.). "In the Aeroplane Over the Sea – Neutral Milk Hotel". AllMusic. Archived from the original on June 6, 2012.
- Brunner, Rob (March 6, 1998). "In the Aeroplane Over the Sea". Entertainment Weekly. Archived from the original on November 25, 2017.
- DeVille, Chris (February 9, 2018). "In The Aeroplane Over The Sea Turns 20". Stereogum. Archived from the original on February 9, 2019.
- Jayasuriya, Sahan (April 27, 2015). "At Long Last, Neutral Milk Hotel Performs in Milwaukee". Milwaukee Magazine.
- McDermott, M. Christian (n.d.). "Neutral Milk Hotel: In The Aeroplane Over The Sea". Pitchfork. Archived from the original on January 8, 2001.
- Valys, Phillip (May 4, 2015). "Neutral Milk Hotel: No vacancy". Sun-Sentinel. Archived from the original on April 12, 2020.
