= D. I. Go Pop =

Studio album by Disco Inferno
- Released: 28 February 1994
- Recorded: 1992–1993
- Studios: Cazimi, Leyton, East London
- Genres: Post-rock; experimental rock; sampledelia
- Length: 33:26
- Label: Rough Trade
- Producer: Charlie McIntosh

Disco Inferno chronology
In Debt (1992)	D. I. Go Pop (1994)	Technicolour (1996)

D. I. Go Pop is the second studio album by English post-rock band Disco Inferno, released on 28 February 1994. After forming as a post-punk band in 1989, the band subsequently worked towards an innovative production approach that incorporated found sound elements through extensive use of digital samplers. The band released several critically acclaimed EPs in this vein from 1992–93, and recorded D. I. Go Pop concurrently with some of those preceding EPs, working with producer Charlie McIntosh. The album cover, designed by Fuel and featuring photography by David Spero, has been described as "one of the most indelible album cover images in the '90s."

The album was released by Rough Trade Records in the United Kingdom and by Bar/None Records in the United States. It did not chart and was mostly overlooked on release, bar some positive reviews. However, it has since gone on to be considered an innovative and influential album and a key release in the history of post-rock. Numerous bands have cited it as an influence. It has been featured in several lists of the greatest albums of the 1990s and of all time. The album was remastered and re-released by One Little Indian Records in March 2004, bringing the album renewed attention from both critics and music buyers.

== Background ==
Disco Inferno formed in 1989 in Essex by teenagers Ian Crause (guitars and vocals), Paul Willmott (bass), Daniel Gish (keyboards) and Rob Whatley (drums), although Gish soon quit the band to join Bark Psychosis, leaving Disco Inferno to become a trio. They were initially a post-punk band heavily influenced by bands such as Joy Division and Wire, releasing their first album Open Doors, Closed Windows (1991) alongside the "Entertainment"/"Arc in Round" single, also from 1991, and 1992's Science EP, all of which were compiled onto the compilation In Debt (1992). However, Crause soon became infatuated with the unique sounds of bands My Bloody Valentine and the Young Gods, as well as the Bomb Squad's revolutionary production and sampling on the music of Public Enemy, and with the release of the Summer's Last Sound EP, released later on in 1992, the band's musical style shifted towards sample-based electronic sounds. The band "hit upon a seemingly simple but ultimately world-opening idea" with the EP: to write their instruments through samplers, and unlike their contemporaries who only sampled elements of music, film dialogue or other media, Disco Inferno "engaged with the whole world", using their set up to record additional sounds as well, ranging from running water, the wind, whistling birds, boots, car crashes and angry voices. Crause had purchased a Roland S-750 sampler with his savings and started programming towards the band's sound for six months. In a 2011 interview, Wilmott recalled of the era:

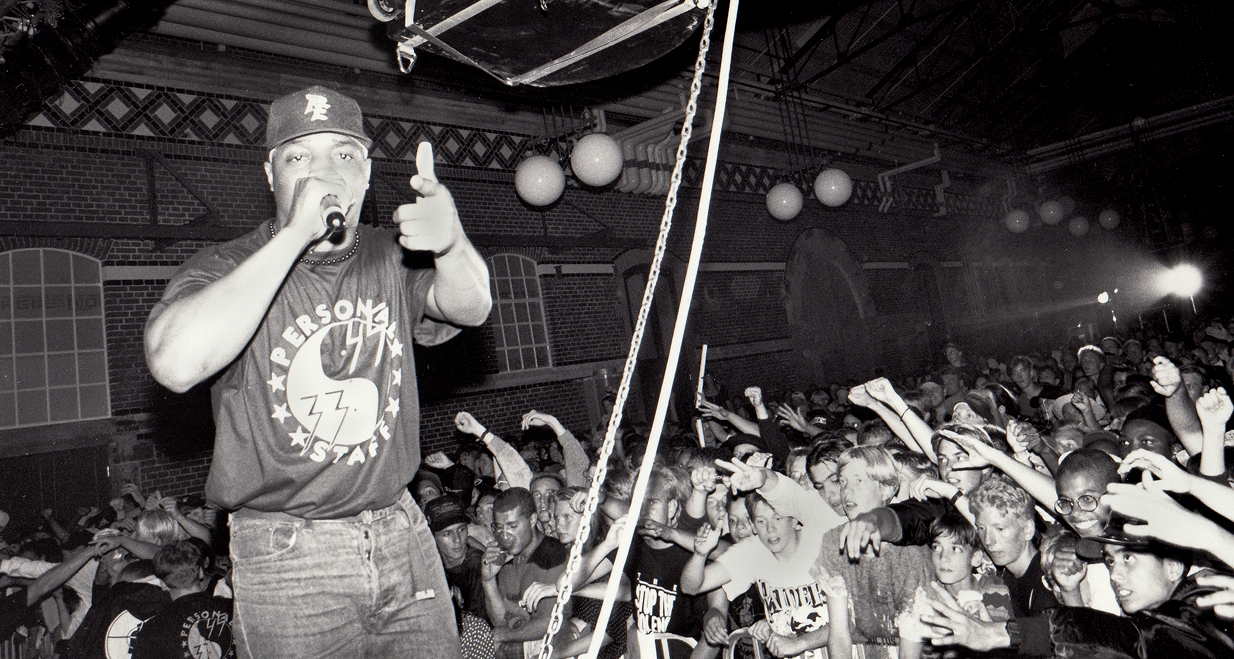
The production style of Public Enemy and the Bomb Squad was an important influence on Disco Inferno.

"We had recorded the Science EP, got some slightly better press, but were still playing to the bar staff most nights in any venue that would let us play. We were frustrated, ambitious and wanted to make an impression. Bands that we liked were using samplers and there seemed to be no reason apart from the financial that we shouldn't look to use them. We were listening to Blue Lines, Loveless, Adventures Beyond the Ultraworld; open to possibilities. We were conscious of the clone indie kid and wanted to be anything but tribal. We had been together just over three years and collectively were getting nowhere; it became a shit or bust moment. At least we would die trying. I always thought that the thing that made DI distinctive post-In Debt was the complete lack of pretence in our approach."

Summer's Last Sound was praised for its uncompromising, innovative and experimental sound, and the group expanded the approach with their subsequent EPs A Rock to Cling To (July 1993) and The Last Dance (November 1993), both of which were released on Rough Trade Records after their previous label Cheree closed. According to Andy Kellman of AllMusic, the new label "saved the band's life, as the members believed that they were too challenging for anyone else to understand or care for." Kellman commented that, "disorienting, confusing, and highly schizophrenic, the challenging releases were in direct contrast to the prevailing Britpop scene of the time," taking "A.R. Kane's futurist pop a couple steps further and secured a devout and small following that found solace in their wildly imaginative, peerless nature." The band became characterized as one of the first post-rock bands.

== Recording ==
The band began work on their second studio album concurrently with some of the band's later EPs in 1993. However, despite the critical success of the band's EPs, the band had not been commercially successful. A journalist at The Quietus recalled that "the sparse tiny-numbered disconnection of DI's audience, the rarity of finding anyone else who understood just how great they were, became disheartening," despite the praises of the band written by David Stubbs, Taylor Parkes, Lucy Cage, Jon Selzer and Simon Price in the British music press. Crause recalled, "I remember our manager once telling us we had enough good reviews to wallpaper our houses with but we needed to pay our bills. It did start to become apparent in the last year or so that the reviews, especially in Melody Maker, counted for absolutely nothing in sales terms, which I belatedly came to realise were the be all and end all of being in a band if we needed to survive."

As such, the band recorded D. I. Go Pop under Crause's increasing tension, working with producer Charlie McIntosh, seeking to continue the evolution of the band's sample-based sound. Although the time between writing and recording was usually very short for the band, not leaving "much time to fully evolve each cycle," the writing and recording of D. I. Go Pop was the longest time that the band had spent outside a studio concentrating on a spread of songs. Wilmott recalled in 2011 that he finds it difficult when he hears "about Ian's issues throughout this period, as they are usually horribly remembered and pay little or no attention to his own behaviour which can at best be described as erratic."

Tracks from the album had been worked on in conjunction with songs from the earlier-released EPs. Some of the album's tracks were worked on by the band at the same time as "Summer's Last Sound" and "Love Stepping Out", the two songs from the Summer's Last Sound EP in 1992, their first sample-based release. Crause recalled that "Summer's Last Sound" and those particular D. I. Go Pop songs "sounded much more exciting" than "Love Stepping Out". Ned Raggett of The Quietus noted that the band's following EP, A Rock to Cling To, was recorded at the same time as the songs that would eventually form D. I. Go Pop. Wilmott recalled that the title track of A Rock to Cling To was "very much a part of the D. I. Go Pop sessions" and was originally intended to appear on the album. Crause and Wilmott had also both read The Timelords' "how to have a number one single" book The Manual, which "bizarrely" had an effect on the way that they approached this batch of songs, and the title Go Pop reflected that.

== Music ==
"The story of Disco Inferno is and remains that of focused intelligence, a desire not to simply repeat, a belief that ‘pop’ is eternally mutable and can mean whatever it wants, or what its creators want. [D. I. Go Pop is] short like many a great pop collection, barely cresting half an hour, it wastes no breath. It’s a classic three piece rock band not wanting to sound like one when they didn’t have to, because the technological tools were to hand."

— Ned Raggett referring to the album in 2014.

D. I. Go Pop furthers the band's sample-based innovative sound, and is often said to be the band's most uncommercial and least "pop" album, bringing irony to the album title. Adrien Begrand of PopMatters said that, after the innovative post-rock sound established on the EPs, "the band was quickly moving toward something big, and it would all come to a head on [D. I. Go Pop]". According to Scott Plangehoff of Pitchfork, the album is "the most challenging and least 'pop' full-length in the band's catalog," adding that it "retains the arpeggios and fractured melodicism of their then-recent singles, and adds increasing layers of disorienting samples and paranoia." He commented that "D. I. Go Pop is an album of contradictions: Prescient, uneasy ballads like 'Even the Sea Sides Against Us' and 'A Whole Wide World Ahead' recoil from the potential cruelty of human nature but are tethered by an aching off-kilter beauty." Critics have described D. I. Go Pop as a post-rock and experimental rock album.

Ned Raggett of The Quietus said the album was an album of "urban sound with seaside and seasonal reveries that aren't quite that, a burst of activity that could also be a last gasp." Writing for AllMusic, he said that "pop hooks existed on the record, but only in the most spare, hard-to-find of forms; otherwise, Disco Inferno was out to create an album to challenge as many listeners as possible without fully embracing a noise approach." Begrand said that "one would expect that the end result would wind up being nothing more than a chaotic, noisy, haphazard, cut-and-paste attempt at musical assemblage, and yeah, there is a fair bit of cacophony on this album, but like My Bloody Valentine’s timeless classic Loveless, underneath the din is an album of such startling beauty, and even more surprising structure, that once you notice it, it seems like a huge revelation."

Raggett also commented that Rob Whatley was "transformed" from being "just" a drummer to "someone also playing percussive samples and other sounds", which "took the man/machine focus of a figure like Stephen Morris and ratcheted it up into a different realm," whilst Crause was described as writing "angry" lyrics for the album. Crause, "an admitted misanthrope," often delivered a "very bleak, Morrissey-esque worldview" in his lyrics on the band's early singles, and Begrand noted that "although you do hear bits and pieces of a similar sentiment on this album (“Chameleon skin/Is what you need to be in/When nothing's as it appears/Why should you be?”), his vocals are buried so deeply in the mix, it's impossible to tell just exactly what he's singing most of the time." The plaintive, melancholy "Even the Sea Sides Against Us", one of the more instantly accessible songs on the album, revisits the more post-punk sound of their earlier material, as Crause's lyrics "sound as charmingly morose as ever ("We're waiting for a future to come and sweep us away")." Scott Plagenhoef of Pitchfork said that "on much of the album, Crause's bitterness and aggression seems trapped in a swirl of larger sounds, his voice and fears struggling to be heard or comprehended above the dins of abstract noise and the weight of the world around him."

=== Composition ===
"At a time when Beatles worship and consensus-forming was usurping UK rock's post-Acid House surge of creativity, Disco Inferno understood that technology needn't be the enemy of guitar-rock and that songcraft and progression aren't oppositional forces."

— Scott Plagenhoef of Pitchfork

According to Raggett, opening song "In Sharky Water" begins with water sounds, a basic bass and a drum's low pulse, before leading into "the drowsy swing of the band followed by the most abstract aggression anyone had ever come up with since Wire on 154." "New Clothes for the New World" features Crause's "distorted and fragmented" vocals playing against "ragged" church bell samples and a jaunty whistle. Raggett noted his voice and lyrics project "the electronic paranoia which Radiohead polished up very well for OK Computer, but he's all the much more intense, crackling with a nervous energy and lingering horror for what will be just around the corner." "Starbound: All Burnt Out & Nowhere to Go" features "camera clicks" and a looping, "squiggly 'everybody everybody' chant" alongside "deliberate guitar pluckings". "A Crash at Every Speed" features a "guitar grind" playing "amidst the trebly chaos of keyboards, cars, glass shards [and] planes."

"Even the Sea Sides Against Us" "floats on an acoustic guitar bed endlessly looping around a series of wave sounds and odd keyboard touches, and so forth." Raggett noted how the song "turns to the profoundly, coldly, electrically beautiful, soft strum-like sounds, high twinkles, an unexpected balm even as Crause pitilessly notes 'You don't expect to be seen, you don't expect to be heard.'" "Next Year" features "plaintive" vocals performing as "an odd voice of hope amidst wheezing, clattering sounds and crunch." Raggett said that "A Whole Wide World Ahead" conjures up "the acoustic guitar/rain combination in newer, stranger ways, odd unexpected rhythms, [with] Crause noting, 'There's not enough shelter from all the madness around' as the melancholy flow gets more desperate and lost." The album finishes with "Footprints in Snow", which "sparkles and twinkles" and was the described as the album's only moment "of hope". Andrew Unterberger of Stylus Magazine called it one of the "loveliest songs of D.I.’s career." The song ends with a found sound tape recording of a landlady of a Stratford, London pub asking the band to turn the volume down, taken from one of the band's early concerts.

== Album cover ==
The album cover was the second sleeve designed by design agency Fuel, following on from The Last Dance EP and being continued by the Second Language EP, and as with the EPs, it features a landscape photograph by David Spero with the Disco Inferno radar logo superimposed. Fuel were originally contacted by the band's manager Mike Collins, who had seen their work through a piece about them in The Sunday Times, and thought their aesthetic matched that of the band. Crause recalled that, "at first, [Fuel] used to call us in and have a chat about some ideas they'd had, but after a couple of releases we were so headfucked by their covers that we just let them do exactly what they wanted. I have always thought we had some of the best record sleeves of the 90s. In that period, Fuel are about the only people I'm aware of who equaled those extraordinary Factory and 4AD sleeves from the 70s and 80s." Fuel desired to design a bold logo for the band to give them a strong identity from the start, with the original symbol dating back to the 1930s and having a "simultaneous clarity and ambiguity that complimented their sound."

For all three releases, they worked with photographer David Spero, whose landscape photographs were described as "quite unusual for a record sleeve at the time; they were beautiful images of nothingness. The direction of the logo changed with each sleeve to suit the image and echo the idea of sound traveling in different directions. Both the music and art had an ambiguity about them; the band had taken a step into a creative unknown, and the covers reflected this." Andrew Swainson, who had designed the pre-Last Dance album sleeves, said although he "was gutted at the time" that the band had switched sleeve designers for The Last Dance, he still bought D. I. Go Pop. Adrien Begrand of PopMatters said the album cover become better known than the album itself in North America, saying "if you lived in North America, far away from a good record store, the only thing you would know about Disco Inferno’s album D. I. Go Pop would be its distinctive cover art. That photograph of a pastoral English setting, bluntly obscured by a white circle in the center, with three arcs extending outward, looking like monstrous sound waves emitting from the middle of a lake, was one of the most indelible album cover images in the '90s, yet so few people actually heard the music inside."

== Release ==
D. I. Go Pop was released on 28 February 1994 on Rough Trade Records in the United Kingdom as a CD and LP and Bar/None Records shortly afterwards in the United States as only a CD. The LP edition featured a sticker of the band's logo on the cover bearing the album title and band name to identify it from the front. No singles were released to promote the album, and it charted in neither country, but the good press of the band in the UK nonetheless increased interest in the band, and in the United States, the album still found an audience despite its near-total lack of promotion. Neil Kulkarni of The Quietus said that "weirdly for such an elementally British band, DI have long been of almost mythical status in the US. My old Maker/Metal Hammer mucker Jon Selzer recalls wearing a rare orange DI shirt to Washington DC and being stopped every five minutes by someone insistent on telling him how much DI meant to them." The album title shares its name with the second song on the band's 1993 EP The Last Dance.

One Little Indian Records remastered and re-released D. I. Go Pop and the band's following album Technicolour on CD on 9 March 2004 in the UK and 20 April 2004 in the US, coinciding with the tenth anniversary of D. I. Go Pop. In the US, this re-release was part of One Little Indian's "Crossing the Pond" series of remastered editions of British albums that were never released domestically in the United States. PopMatters said that "a full decade after D. I. Go Pop's initial release, it's the perfect opportunity for people to discover one of rock's most innovative, tragically overlooked bands, and might I add, it's about bloody time." Pitchfork considered the remasters of the two albums to be "the jewels in the crown of One Little Indian's 'Crossing the Pond' reissue campaign" alongside A.R. Kane's 69 (1988) and i (1989).

D. I. Go Pop was reissued on vinyl for the first time since its original release by One Little Indian Records on 1 December 2017.

== Critical reception ==
Professional ratings
Review scores
Source	Rating
AllMusic	4.5/5 stars
Consumable	8/10
Pitchfork	9.3/10

The album was mostly overlooked at the time of release by music critics. Adrien Begrand of PopMatters said the album "didn't get heaps of press" in either the UK or North America. However, he did note that "if you read British music magazines around 1994, there was a good chance you probably came across a small article or two about a young band called Disco Inferno. You'd read quotes about how their album was unlike anything anybody had done before, how utterly incredible it was." An early review came from David Landgren of the online magazine Consumable in November 1994, who rated the album eight out of ten, saying "this is altogether a brilliantly executed album, a lonely outpost on the darker reaches of rock'n'roll. Once again, this shows just how innovative the English can be when in comes to rock music. This deserves to be in the collection of anyone who prides themselves on owning a diverse and well-rounded range of music."

Spanish magazine Rockdelux ranked the album at number 22 in their "Albums of the Year" list at the end of 1994, but Begrand recalled that "the album was completely shut out when the major publications made their year-end lists" in the UK or North America. In January 1995, it caught the attention of American magazine Alternative Press, who reviewed the album very favourably, saying "this uncheerful British trio are forging challenging music that threatens to break free of rock's shackles. This frigid, melancholy music bristles with a contrary adventurousness. Amazing stuff that will sadly hit too few ears."

The album has gone on to receive increasing attention and critical acclaim, especially after the release of its 2004 remastered edition which Andrew Unterberger of Stylus Magazine said led to the album being "formally embraced by, in some cases, the critics who neglected it the first time around." Ned Raggett, in a review for AllMusic, rated the album four-and-a-half stars out of five, saying that "Go Pop resembles no other album so much as Wire's 154 for the modern day--very English, encompassing a variety of styles and approaches, seemingly totally cryptic yet more touching to the mind, body and soul than anyone might have expected," and concluding that, "probably one of the only bands truly worthy of the term 'post-rock,' Disco Inferno is heading in a direction that no previous band has fully embraced."

Reviewing the album for PopMatters, Adrien Begrand was very positive. He said that although the band's sample-based EPs are just as essential, "it's the band's irreverent genius and the meticulous arrangements on D. I. Go Pop that stick in your mind the longest" and commented that "unlike that grouchy landlady [featured at the end of the album], you'll be wanting to turn this music up, not down." In the May 2005 issue of Spin, Andrew Beaujon, reviewing Joy Division's Unknown Pleasures, told readers to "also try" D. I. Go Pop, describing it as "English goofballs [finding] beauty in frustration, futility and a computer lab's worth of obsolete machines losing their shit." David James of Optimistic Underground said in 2009 that he "won't try to describe the sounds [on the album] other than, generally speaking, they were far ahead of their time in the use of sampling, presaging everything from Matmos to The Books to Animal Collective's later albums," calling it a "truly worthy yet well-hidden gem." Will Hermes of Rolling Stone said the album was a "shot heard 'round the corner, if that: a lost masterpiece of evocative blur channeling Joy Division's melodic gloom through My Bloody Valentine's blissful noise-swarms, with sample loops outgunning the guitars."

Tiny Mix Tapes were also very positive, saying "Disco Inferno simply wanted to shine on us the light of a fundamentally strange hue, a new context in which to enjoy pop music forms. This won't decimate society and crush your religion. It will tweak your eardrums, and may just plant a knowing grin on your face." Scott Plagenhoef of Pitchfork rated the album 9.3/10, saying "D. I. Go Pop retains the arpeggios and fractured melodicism of their then-recent singles, and adds increasing layers of disorienting samples and paranoia" and said it was "nearly as urgent and key" as the band's sample-based EPs. In 2011, Eye Plug noted that Pitchfork's review resulted in a swell of activity across internet message boards, and "appears to have left a continued wake of interest." Andrew Unterberger of Stylus Magazine, although a fan of the album, found it imperfect without the inclusion of several of the songs from the prior EPs, and chose the album for a "Playing God" feature for the magazine in which he picked a definitive, personalised track list for the album.

== Aftermath and legacy ==
"So the church bells and whistles and sea crashes continue to act twenty years later, but the whole thing still feels, even now, at once unstable and carefully balanced, the bones of the songs never totally broken but never allowed to slip by without something profound being done to them. An urban sound with seaside and seasonal reveries that aren't quite that, a burst of activity that could also be a last gasp. And still so angry, so pitiless yet so heartfelt, the kind of thing that stays in your head when all the rah-rah charge of the immediate and clunky becomes camp rote."

— Ned Raggett referring on the continuing impact of D. I. Go Pop in 2014.

Disco Inferno released two more EPs later on in 1994: Second Language, which became "Single of the Week" in Melody Maker, and It's a Kid World, whilst they recorded their third and final album Technicolour shortly afterwards following the theft of the band's samplers, but the band ultimately split up, leaving Technicolour unreleased until mid-1996. Wilmott said that he found the band's dissolution to be frustrating, since they were "finally getting some recognition" when they split, recalling that "the last gig that we had played was our biggest, headlining at The Purcell Room which was also featured as a Mixing It session on Radio 3." Technicolour moved the band towards a slightly more accessible and pop-influenced sound than D. I. Go Pop, although it still retained the band's trademark experimental sound. It was well received by music critics but not as well as D. I. Go Pop.

Despite the underground status of D. I. Go Pop, it has gone on to become considered by critics and musicians to be a groundbreaking and innovative release and an important post-rock album. Bands such as The Avalanches, Deerhunter, Animal Collective and MGMT have acknowledged the band and the album as a big influence, with MGMT's Ben Goldwasser rhapsodizing that they "still sound like the future." However, the album's unique approach is said to have been seldom replicated, with PopMatters stating in 2005 that "as current artists like Manitoba and Four Tet have the technology to assemble albums much more easily these days, the painstaking lengths that Disco Inferno went to perfect their sound in those pre-folktronica days is only occasionally duplicated today." David James said that "this batch of tunes was far ahead of its time in the use of sampling, presaging everything from the cut-and-paste electronica of Matmos to Animal Collective’s pop breakthrough Merriweather Post Pavilion." Johnny Mugwamp of Fact considers the album to be "absolute fucking bedlam" and "the most important album of the 1990s."

Writing for The Quietus in 2014, Ned Raggett said that "to me D. I. Go Pop is itself still fresh. And it IS fresh, a knotted twisted agglomeration of approaches from the time when post rock as a term made a certain sense, the idea that a kind of form had been perfected, so why not explode it?" He opined that Radiohead's 1997 album OK Computer was "a far more glossy take on what D. I. Go Pop was trying to articulate, far more glossy and far less specific, far more comfortable. And I do speak as a Radiohead fan," adding that "time itself points out other comparisons to me – one friend described what Disco Inferno were doing here and elsewhere as being 'a digital This Heat', looking back to an earlier set of UK prophets without honour; another explicitly made a connection to the maniacal vivisections of sound by Australian legends Severed Heads, who Crause later spoke about hearing well after the fact – sometimes the connections are out there, but implied rather than direct. A similar sense of seeing a limit then wondering, 'Why stop?' Destructive or self-destructive in some cases, but when talking about art rather than dissipation, a very understandable impulse." Commenting on the album's relevance in 2014, he said:

"Good god were Disco Inferno an angry, frustrated band. Some of that dark energy eventually became interpersonal, ended the group after the increasingly bad hands fate and life dealt them, but so much of it was the thrill of getting something off their chests, looking around at where they were at, the country they were in and the structures they had to deal with, and mentally blowing it the hell up. But not chaotically, not in the sense of uncontrolled roar and sprawl. Disco Inferno instead focused it all, layered it, delivered it sometimes cryptically, sometimes immediately and in painfully direct ways. Never sloganeering as such, never rabble rousing, more the voice that captures how things can make you punch a wall at just how stupidly moronically unfair it all is, but exacerbated by people theoretically speaking for all who can’t even be bothered with any sense of lip service, or are clearly too blind to realise what they say. D. I. Go Pop came out of Thatcher's wake; any wonder that it sounds just as aggrieved now in the full churn of Cameron and Clegg's clusterfuck of a shotgun marriage?"

D. I. Go Pop is often considered to be the best of the band's works alongside the sample-based EPs, which were later gathered together for release as The 5 EPs in 2011. Nonetheless, in a 2011 interview with The Quietus, Crause said "I like the fact there seems to be no consensus about what our best recordings are. Some people like D. I. Go Pop most, some the EPs and some Technicolour. All will say they have proof of why X is the best as opposed to the others. I like that and I have no favourite."

=== Accolades ===
In 1999, music journalist Ned Raggett ranked the album at number 5 on his list of "The Top 136 or So Albums of the Nineties" for Freaky Trigger. In 2000, Rockdelux ranked the album at number 101 in their list of "The 150 Best Albums from the 90s," and in 2014, they ranked it at number 235 on their list of "The 300 Best Albums from 1984–2014." In 2011, music critic Neil Kulkarni named it "the 2nd greatest British LP of the 90s" in an article about the band for The Quietus. In 2015, Fast 'n' Bulbous ranked the album at number 182 in their list of "The 1000 Best Albums of All Time." Javier Blánquez and Omar Morena included the album in a list of 16 significant "encounters between electronica and pop music" between 1989–2002 in their 2002 book Loops, a History of Electronic Music. The Vinyl Factory included the album in its 2015 list "Storm Static Sleep: The Evolution of Post-Rock in 12 Records," saying "D. I. Go Pop was a protest against those utopian, vacuum-sealed bubbles of radio pop, in which only real instruments and complimentary harmonies were permitted to thrive. This is the sound of music fighting against the flux of the real world. [...] If there’s any justice, it’s only a matter of time before D. I. Go Pop acquires the widespread recognition it deserves." Treble included the album in its 2013 list of "10 Essential Post-Rock Albums," saying that, "heavily incorporating samples amid dense and dreamy melodies, D. I. Go Pop is intoxicating in its artful irreverence."

== Track listing ==
All tracks are written by Ian Crause, Paul Wilmott, and Rob Whatley.

No.	Title	Length
1.	"In Sharky Water"	4:40
2.	"New Clothes for the New World"	2:00
3.	"Starbound: All Burnt Out & Nowhere to Go"	4:01
4.	"A Crash at Every Speed"	4:43
5.	"Even the Sea Sides Against Us"	3:44
6.	"Next Year"	4:04
7.	"A Whole Wide World Ahead"	4:40
8.	"Footprints in Snow"	5:29
Total length:		33:26

== Personnel ==
- Ian Crause – vocals, guitar, sampling
- Paul Wilmott – bass guitar
- Rob Whatley – drums, sampling
- Eugene Desmond Silk – post-script on "Footprints in Snow"
- Charlie McIntosh – production
- Fuel – design
- David Spero – photography
