= Technicolour (Disco Inferno album) =

Studio album by Disco Inferno
- Released: 22 July 1996
- Recorded: 1994–1995
- Genre: Experimental pop
- Length: 33:05
- Label: Rough Trade
- Producer: Disco Inferno

Disco Inferno chronology
D. I. Go Pop (1994)	Technicolour (1996)	The Mixing It Session (1999)

Professional ratings
Review scores
Source	Rating
AllMusic	3/5 stars
NME	8/10
Pitchfork	7.0/10
Q	4/5 stars
Record Collector	3/5 stars
Uncut	8/10

Technicolour is the third and final studio album by Disco Inferno, released on 22 July 1996 by Rough Trade Records in the United Kingdom. After releasing the EP It's a Kid's World in September 1994, Disco Inferno found themselves "burnt out and in debt; attracting little commercial success; beset by live failures; struggling against frustration, depression, internal bitterness and against the prevailing musical tide; helplessly caught in Rough Trade's ownership battles; [and] still barely into their twenties"; the trio imploded and called it quits as a band. Technicolour was shelved for nearly two years after the band had dissolved. A projected EP release of "Sleight of Hand" (backed by the unreleased tracks "Keep It Together" and "Drowned Out") was canceled, and an entire album's worth of songs already recorded by singer/guitarist Ian Crause remains unreleased.

Technicolour was followed years later by The 5 EPs, a compilation of various EPs the band had released throughout the early 1990s. One additional EP was also released by the band after Technicolour, 1999's The Mixing It Session, a release of a BBC Radio 3 session recorded in 1994. In 2004, One Little Indian reissued Technicolour in the United States, and the album was released on vinyl for the first time in April 2018.

== Track listing ==
All tracks are written by Ian Crause, Paul Wilmott, and Rob Whatley.

No.	Title	Length
1.	"Technicolour"	3:37
2.	"Things Move Fast"	3:02
3.	"I'm Still in Love"	2:10
4.	"Sleight of Hand"	3:59
5.	"Don't You Know"	4:48
6.	"It's a Kid's World" (Samples "Lust for Life" by Iggy Pop)	4:30
7.	"When the Story Breaks"	3:11
8.	"Can't See Through It"	3:53
9.	"Over and Over"	3:51
Total length:		33:05

== Personnel ==
- Ian Crause – vocals, guitar, samples
- Paul Wilmott – bass guitar
- Rob Whatley – drums, samples
- John Coxon – engineer
- Mads Bjerke – engineer, mixing
- Clifton Hepburn – illustration
- Fuel – design
- Michael Collins – management
