= The Last Dance (EP) =

EP by Disco Inferno
- Released: 18 November 1993
- Recorded: The Midlands, 1993
- Genres: Experimental rock; post-rock; post-punk
- Length: 21:59
- Label: Rough Trade Records
- Producers: Michael Johnson; Charlie McIntosh

Disco Inferno chronology
A Rock to Cling To (1993)	The Last Dance (1993)	D. I. Go Pop (1994)

Singles from The Last Dance
- 1. "The Last Dance" Released: November 1993

The Last Dance is the fourth EP and seventh overall release by English post-rock and experimental rock band Disco Inferno. The EP was the band's third release to develop their innovative production and sample-based approach. After initially recording sessions for the EP with their original producer Charlie McIntosh, the band's label, Rough Trade Records was unsatisfied with the sessions, and instead the band worked with a new producer, Michael Johnson, famous for his work with New Order. His production ethic included a period of pre-production, the first time the band had used this process.

The EP consists of four tracks and is considered by music journalists to be a highly eclectic release. It was released by Rough Trade Records in November 1993 in the UK alone, with the title track released as a white label single. The EP cover was the band's first of many of the band's artworks designed by Fuel with photography from David Spero. The EP was mostly overlooked upon its release but has subsequently been praised, alongside the rest of the band's output in this era, to be highly innovative. The EP was taken out of print shortly after release but was remastered and re-released as part of the compilation The 5 EPs in November 2011.

== Background ==
"Bands that we liked were using samplers and there seemed to be no reason apart from the financial that we shouldn't look to use them. We were listening to Blue Lines, Loveless, Adventures Beyond the Ultraworld; open to possibilities."

— Paul Willmott recalling the band's shift in sound.

Disco Inferno was formed in 1989 in Essex by teenagers Ian Crause (guitars and vocals), Paul Willmott (bass), Daniel Gish (keyboards) and Rob Whatley (drums), although Gish soon quit the band to join Bark Psychosis, leaving Disco Inferno to become a trio. Although the band was initially a post-punk band heavily influenced by bands such as Joy Division and Wire, Crause soon became infatuated with the unique sounds of bands My Bloody Valentine and the Young Gods, as well as the Bomb Squad's revolutionary production and sampling on the music of Public Enemy, and with the release of the Summer's Last Sound EP, released later on in 1992, the band's musical style changed towards sample-based electronic sounds. The band "hit upon a seemingly simple but ultimately world-opening idea" with the EP: to write their instruments through samplers, and unlike their contemporaries who sampled elements of music, film dialogue or other media, Disco Inferno "engaged with the whole world," using their set-up to record sounds ranging from running water, the wind, whistling birds, boots, car crashes and angry voices.

Although it was not a commercial success, the uncompromising, innovative and experimental sound of Summer's Last Sound was praised, leading the group to expand the approach with their next release, the EP A Rock to Cling To (1992), their first release on Rough Trade Records after their previous label, Cheree closed. According to Andy Kellman of Allmusic, the new label "saved the band's life, as the members believed that they were too challenging for anyone else to understand or care for." The band became characterized as one of the first post-rock bands. Rather than release another full-length album, they decided to release another EP in the sample-based approach, beginning work on The Last Dance in 1993.

== Recording ==
The band initially recorded sessions for The Last Dance with Charlie McIntosh, but these sessions were rejected by the band's label Rough Trade, so for the first time in the band's career, they worked with a different producer—Michael Johnson, most famous for his engineering work with New Order, with the further assistance of engineer John Rivers. Nonetheless, MacIntosh is still credited as a producer and engineer in the EP's liner notes. Paul Wilmott recalled that he initially felt that working with Johnson "was a betrayal to Charlie," while Ian Crause commented that "it did feel strange," adding that he thought McIntosh "was a bit hurt, but our manager rallied us, and we did it. It was definitely the right thing to have done." Johnson's approach was different from McIntosh's for numerous reasons; most unusually for the band, Johnson arranged a period of pre-production for them, something they had not done before.

The band and Johnson booked into a rehearsal room in Walthamstow, East London, and spent a couple of days working on the title track, largely putting together a drum track with Johnson's drum machine. Wilmott recalled that he "thought Crause embraced it more than [Wilmott] did purely for the New Order connection," with him commenting that "I was a little unsure as it seemed to go against what we were working towards. But once we got in to the studio, it became more exciting." In 2011, Crause recalled that, "along with Second Language, The Last Dance was probably the most painless time in the studio. We were in a semi-rural location in the Midlands. Rob and I even managed to go out for a long countryside drive one evening, which would have been out of the question in [London] unless we wanted to see a wild kebab wrapper in its natural habitat." In retrospect, Johnson commented that he always found working with bands inspired by Joy Division and New Order to be a positive thing, saying "it meant they were open to my ideas and weren't suspicious or too wary about my methods and suggestions. The bands always had plenty of originality, so they were trying to do their own thing, too." Crause said that "When Michael suggested something, we just did it. I probably flinched when he said Rob should play a normal drum kit again, but I wouldn't have said anything. The pre-stated aim was to let him take us away from our rehearsal-room sound into a pop sound. It's probably safe to say that we entered Planet Normal during these sessions and did what everyone else was doing."

== Music ==
The Last Dance was the band's first EP to contain four songs instead of two, although as with the band's other EPs, it is sometimes considered a single. According to Ned Raggett of Pitchfork Media, "The Last Dance was in many ways a profound change from the group's previous releases" and ranges "from the serene sonic calm" of "Scattered Showers" to the "extreme frenzy" of "D.I. Go Pop." Writing for Allmusic, he said that The Last Dance was "a teaser for the astonishing D. I. Go Pop album (as with all the threesome's other singles, it contained nothing from an actual album), which "captured the band perfecting the low-key, crisp sound that characterized their more accessible numbers and their total, uncompromising extremism." According to Jonny Mugwamp of Fact Mag, "The Last Dance features two similar versions of the title song that find the band working in unexpectedly melodic and relatively sample-free New Order-ish territory – sonically, at least" which are "offset by two other songs." He considered the EP to be an "overload." Dan Cooper-Gavin of Drowned in Sound called the EP the band's most "difficult" so far, saying "The Last Dance is significant, then, as the concept of radio-friendliness enters the band’s consciousness."

=== "The Last Dance" ===
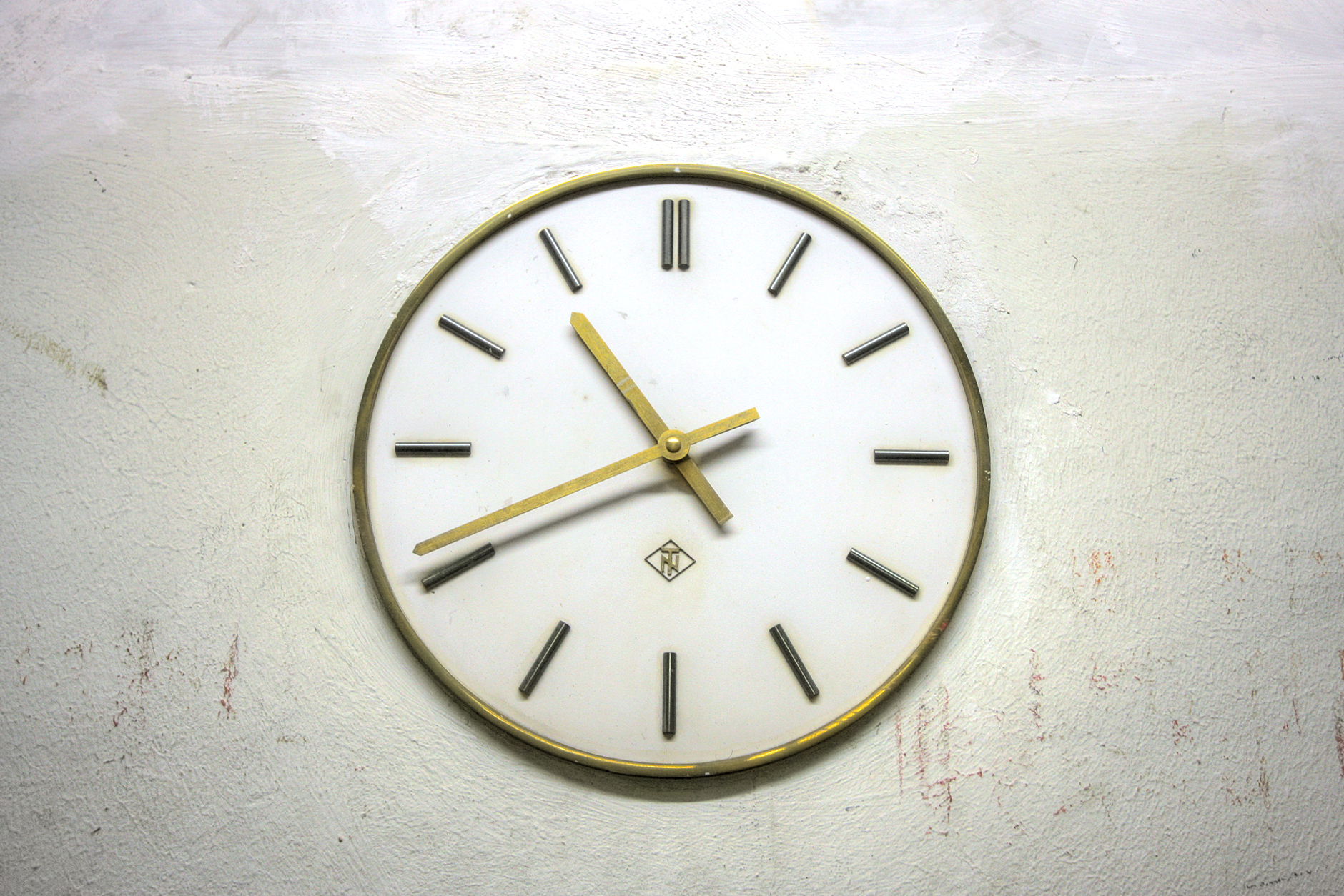
Unlike other songs by the band in this era, the title track contains few samples, the most prominent being a ticking clock.

The EP opens with its title track. Music journalist Tom Ewing called it "the least formally groundbreaking of DI’s records," but noted that "the moment [he] heard it, I was floored by its originality and sense of purpose." Unlike the band's other songs in the era, the amount of samples in the song is kept to a minimum, with the only apparent samples being a constant ticking of clocks and a crowd chanting in the distance. Nonetheless, Ewing stated that "The Last Dance" is also the band's "wisest, most moving song, a meditation on history, on the impossibility of making something new in art, and on the need to try and do so anyhow. It’s also their most musically endearing, a tune as taut and poignant as anything Wire ever recorded, with delicate guitar lines meshing and weaving, always pretty but always understated."

Although Crause's singing "was barely singing at all," "he made it a virtue, his slightly breathless voice sounding urgent, desperate to communicate, but at the same time faltering." On "The Last Dance,", he sighs, "Was there ever a time / Like this?" just before the guitars "skid all over the track," and according to Ewing, "it's as inspiring as it is heartbreaking." Raggett noted that had another band recorded the song, the result "would have been a pleasant post-punk slice of energy, something which could have been recorded by New Order, Echo and the Bunnymen, or perhaps even the Field Mice. Here, though, limits are pushed just enough. Crause's voice sounds just alien enough with subtle distortion -- the samples he triggers with his guitar -- rather than the lovely, echoed chiming itself -- help carry the song. Wilmot's bass and Whatley's drums are very much to the fore, disturbing the expected mix as a result." Nick Southall of Stylus Magazine called the song "straight-ahead post-punk pop music but re-imagined and reconstructed with added detail taken from the world outside."

=== "D. I. Go Pop" ===
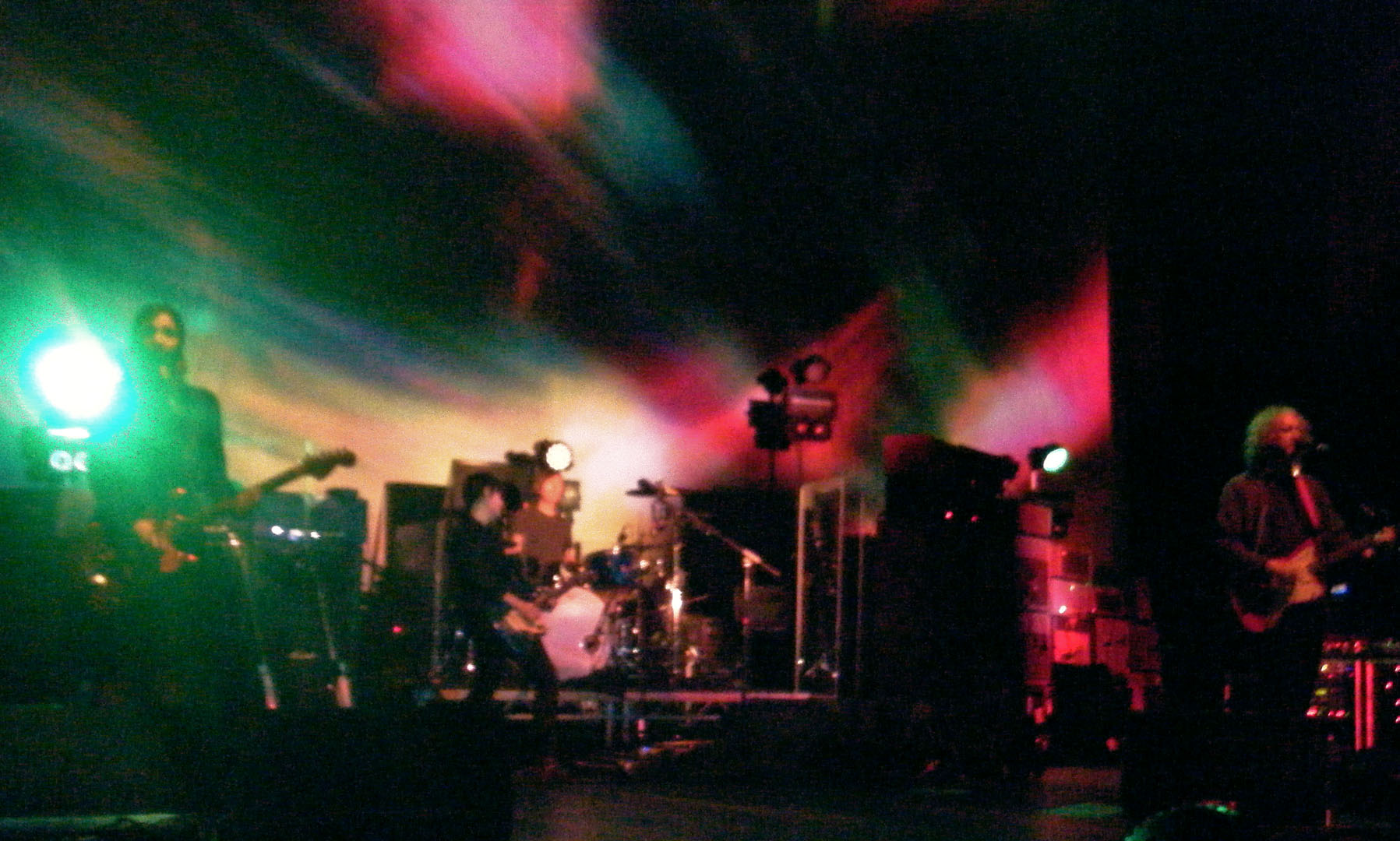
"D. I. Go Pop" consists of a looped sample of "You Made Me Realise" by My Bloody Valetine (pictured).

"D. I. Go Pop" was "essentially put together like a garage band" and consists of a second-long sample of the My Bloody Valentine song "You Made Me Realise", taken from the band's 1988 EP of the same name, pitched across Crause's guitar "with the unpredictable fret release firing off samples at a much higher pitch by chance," giving it an even more chaotic feel. Raggett described the song, saying "after a pleasant radio announcer sample, an incredibly messed-up loop of sound -- the band is in it somewhere, but not as much as all the other strange noises and notes crammed into the music -- serves as the bed for a perversely simple but completely uneasy listening melody. Crause delivers his lyrics with a slight urgency, but no more, over the bedlam." In 2011, Mugwamp of Fact Mag said the song is "like a hyper-compressed, furious and deadly serious Butthole Surfers circa Locust Abortion Technician," which "still prompts one of my fondest memories of what were truly horrible times in my life, when a bewildered housemate stormed into my room yelling 'Why the fuck are you listening to three songs at once!'"

Crause recalled that "That sample does make you jump, doesn't it? I sometimes dreaded starting it off, especially when it was coming through a full PA. It's like waiting for a firework to go off-- you know the bang's coming, it's just the waiting for it that does your nerves in. I can't remember the exact lyrics, but we were starting to laugh between ourselves about our lack of success, and I was also beginning to increasingly think of us as a cartoon band to reflect our total hopelessness, which I got from Paul, who was the chief giggler. So you pretend it wasn't that important all along, even though it's killing you. Cartoon purgatory would be where this obviously made-up tale put us: a world of black irony." The song shares its name with the band's second album, D. I. Go Pop, also recorded in 1993 but released afterwards in 1994. Mugwamp stated the song "revealed exactly what was to be waiting" on the album. Andrew Unterberger of Stylus Magazine said the sound of the song "is something like a Buzzcocks single whose RPM can’t seem to remain steady, constantly spinning faster and slowing down again. The stuttering guitar riff is absolutely mesmerizing, sounding like the group is struggling to get it out as quickly as possible. How the song manages to unearth some really gorgeous hooks out of the mess is just unbelievable." Jon Dale of Dusted Magazine, interpreting the song's lyrical content, said:

"Ian Crause’s half-sung rant perpetually fighting with an accelerating rush of engine roar, as though the song’s accelerator is welded to the metal. It’s like The Bomb Squad if they’d spent their youth shirking around inner London. "D. I. Go Pop” is also one of the most accelerated examples of Disco Inferno’s political program. Unlike a lot of their supposed "post-rock" peers, Disco Inferno were fiercely political, taking in England’s post-Thatcher Tory malaise with the maladjusted spine and perpetual disappointment of a precocious adolescent (which, at the release of "Summer’s Last Sound," Disco Inferno still were). Crause’s pointedly observed lyrics remind me of Green Gartside's early efforts in Scritti Politti. Like Gartside, Ian Crause is adept at finding the critical core of the matter, capturing the minutiae of the political moment, and then panning out to paint the overarching meta-concerns of the day. Sung/spoken with Crause’s disaffected voice, submerged in the hurricanes of sampler detritus the group assembled around their songs, they make for pithy observation amongst a generation more interested in staring at their shoes."

=== "The Long Dance" ===
"The Long Dance" is an extended remix of the title track, remixed by Johnson. The idea for the song came about because the band had extra studio time booked, and Johnson "wanted to play around" with the title track, similarly to how he approached the remixes he had previously produced for New Order. The band were against the idea of remixing themselves prior to the sessions, but found that "working backwards to get "The Last Dance" didn't feel like [they] were remixing anything." In 2011, Ian Crause recalled that he was not initially a fan of the remix, but that his opinion had become more positive over time, saying "I thought it was a bit tacky. I was never a massive fan of even the New Order 12" remixes. The other guys wouldn't have had any qualms about it as they were both well into dance music. Now, I think it's a pretty good track and Michael did a great job." Unterberger considers this version to have "a better intro" than the original and "an extra two minutes of blissful instrumental interplay."

=== "Scattered Showers" ===
"Scattered Showers" closes the EP and was the band's first ever track that was put together with Wilmott doing the majority of the sampling, featured on an Akai S3200. Wilmott himself considers the song a "missed opportunity" which him commenting in 2011 that "it creates an interesting atmosphere but doesn't really do anything. The guitar makes it sound too ethereal. There are songs that we could have been braver with, such as this. If we had treated this in the same way as "Lost In Fog", whereby there is no true root of traditional instrumentation, the result could have been realized to a greater level." Crause also has reservations about the song, saying it "was driven by a sense of absence. It was all stuff about conformity and a black storm coming to instill fear into those who were complacent. It's vague and hazy, adolescent. There's possibly something beautiful in it, but it is too long." Nonetheless, music journalist Ned Raggett commented positively that it "rides a soft, lovely combination of acoustic guitar, piano, and samples, growing thicker and more involved with time, all treated with the combination of intimacy and distance the band excels in." Douglas Walk of Trouser Press said the song is "nearly consumed in an avalanche of sound effects."

== Release ==
""No oceans left to cross, no mountains left to climb / Least that’s what I’ve been told." : Disco Inferno should have mattered more than anyone, but their curse was to turn up at a time when exploring the frontiers of pop – especially using songs – simply wasn’t fashionable any more. They could have settled for the marginal, dessicated [sic?] existence granted to those unhappy bands stuck halfway between indie-pop and the avant-garde, but what kind of living is that to scratch out?"

— Tom Ewing relating lyrics from "The Last Dance" to the band's lack of commercial success.

The EP was the band's second release on Rough Trade Records and was released on 18 November 1993 in the UK alone on CD and LP. A white label twelve-inch single of "The Last Dance" and "The Long Dance" was also distributed by the label to promote the EP. The Last Dance, along with the band's other EPs, was not a commercial success and was soon taken out of print following its release. According to Matthew Olmos of The 405, for many years afterwards, "most modern fans have been passing around increasingly shitty mp3s sourced from a single bootleg CD-R rip of the original vinyl releases [of the EPs]." Music critic Ned Raggett used to personally burn people copies of a compilation CD of the EPs for people requesting them, effectively creating a bootleg. Niany Hong of PopMatters said that "it's unknown how many people were influenced by this bootleg record." However, a remastered compilation of the band's five sample-based EPs, including The Last Dance, was released as the critically acclaimed The 5 EPs released as a CD, 2xLP and digital download on November 14th, 2011 marking the first time the songs from the EP had been in print in some twenty years.

After hiring Andrew Swainson to design the cover art for all the band's previous releases, Disco Inferno hired design agency Fuel to design the artwork and packaging for The Last Dance, which features a logo for the band resembling a radar superimposed over a seascape. Fuel were originally contacted by the band's manager, Mike Collins, who had seen their work through a piece about them in The Sunday Times and thought their aesthetic matched that of the band. Fuel desired to design a bold logo for the band to give the band a strong identity from the start, with the original symbol dating back to the 1930s and having "simultaneous clarity and ambiguity that complimented their sound." The landscape was photographed by photographer David Spero, whose landscape photographs were described as "quite unusual for a record sleeve at the time; they were beautiful images of nothingness." Fuel subsequently designed the band's following album and EP covers, with the covers of the two direct following releases, the D. I. Go Pop album and Second Language EPs, also featuring photography from Spreo and following the same template as the cover for The Last Dance.

== Critical reception and legacy ==
=== 1990s and 2000s ===
Professional ratings
Review scores
Source	Rating
Allmusic	4/5 stars

At the time of the release, the EP was mostly overlooked by the music press, just as it was not a commercial success. Ned Raggett of Allmusic reviewed the EP later on in the 1990s, rating it four stars out of five, saying it "captured the band perfecting the low-key, crisp sound that characterized their more accessible numbers and their total, uncompromising extremism," and after praising the title track, "The Long Dance" and "Scattered Showers," noted that "the jaw-dropper is "D. I. Go Pop" itself." However, in a 2014 article for Pitchfork Media, Raggett said that the "centrepiece is the title song itself, showcasing the band both at its most tensely propulsive and, thanks to a powerful lyric on the oppressive weight of political and cultural history, its most cutting and observational." Following its release, the EP came to be regarded, alongside the band's other sample-based EPs, as a highly innovative release, with Andy Kellman of Allmusic calling the EPs "remarkable," Jon Dale of Dust Magazine calling them "breathtaking collections," and Ned Raggett calling them "brilliant."

Writing for Freaky Trigger in 1999, music journalist Tom Ewing placed "The Last Dance" at number 2 on his list of the "Top 100 Singles of the 90s," saying, although it is "the least formally groundbreaking of DI’s records," it is "also their wisest, most moving song, a meditation on history, on the impossibility of making something new in art, and on the need to try and do so anyhow. It’s also their most musically endearing, a tune as taut and poignant as anything Wire ever recorded, with delicate guitar lines meshing and weaving, always pretty but always understated. [..] On "The Last Dance," [Crause] sighs, “Was there ever a time / Like this?”, just before the guitars skid all over the track, and it's as inspiring as it is heartbreaking." He further commented:

In 1993, making the most radical guitar music in the world, Ian Crause probably didn’t think he was singing about the years ahead and what they would do to pop, but in a way he was: "The noise of the past builds up into a crescendo / And the waves of rubbish…are amplified a million times or more" Too right: no matter how many lists you list or polls you poll, now matter how often you talk up reheated mediocrities or chuck superlatives around, you won’t convince me that an era where bands as dull as Oasis became multi-millionaires and a band as special as Disco Inferno collapsed un-noticed was anything other than an era where things went catastrophically wrong. "In the end it’s not the future, but the past that’ll get us." – single of the 90s? This single looked the 90s in the face, and shuddered."

In a 2005 article for Stylus Magazine, Andrew Unterbeger considered "The Last Dance" and "D. I. Go Pop" to be the band's greatest songs. He described "The Last Dance" as "truly one of the great singles of the mid-90s" with its "gorgeous jangling guitars, driving percussion and the most heartbreaking lyrics Crause ever penned." Meanwhile, writing in 2005 about "D. I. Go Pop," he said that, "Is it sad that 11 years after its release, this is still the first song I think of when I think of music that sounds ahead of its time? But that’s just how fucking mind-blowing this song is." Also writing for Stylus Magazine in 2005, Nick Southall revealed that the EP was a possible choice for inclusion in his list of the "Top Ten EPs" of all time, but instead he included the band's subsequent EP Second Language (1994) into the list because The Last Dance "has thus far evaded my greedy little eBay-scouring mitts."

=== 2010s ===
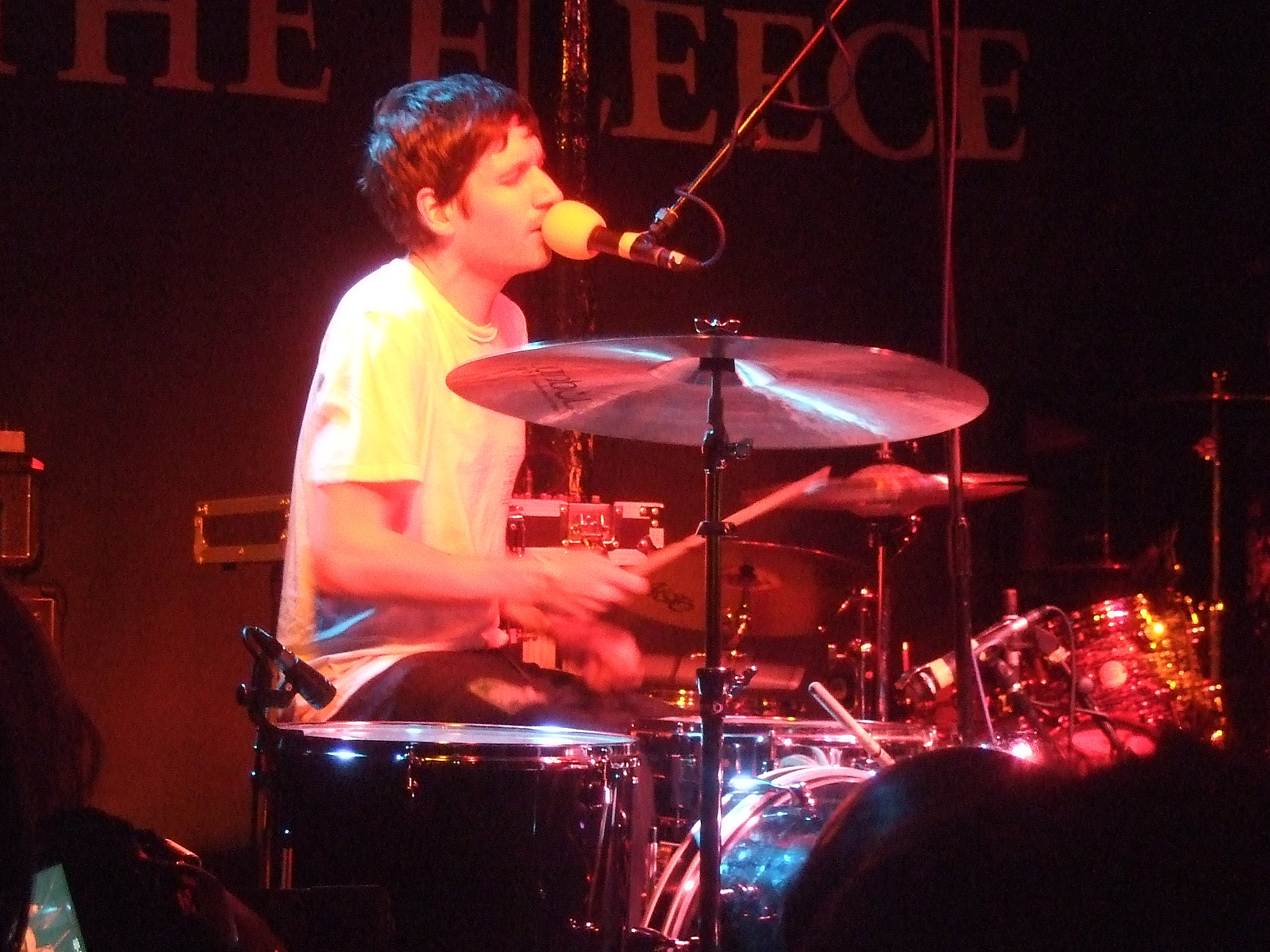
"D. I. Go Pop" has been praised by the likes of Dean Spunt of No Age.

After the EP was included on The 5 EPs in 2011, many more critics took notice of the EP. Dan Cooper-Gavin of Drowned in Sound called The Last Dance "significant," "the lead track being the best single that New Order never released. And yet, this being Disco Inferno, things are never quite that straightforward. Not only is "The Long Dance," the track's alternate take, actually much punchier (and, indeed, New Order-ier) than "The Last Dance", but then sandwiched between the two is "D. I. Go Pop," which, if the title is to be taken at face value, must mark history's single most misguided attempt at cracking the mainstream. Crause spits out his lyrics amidst a woozy cacophony akin to a Walkman warping and unspooling, to create a truly exhilarating rollercoaster ride. Bruno Brookes wouldn't have known what hit him." Jon Dale of Dusted Magazine regarded the title track as "Disco Inferno at their most wide-eyed and populist, like New Order taking a crash course in Marx."

Songs on the album have been cited by musicians as influences. Dean Spunt of the American noise rock duo No Age said in 2011 that "D.I. Go Pop" is a song he "can listen to 50 times in a row and not get sick of. There is so much to decipher and read into. An amazing piece of music." Double Denim Records owner and Pitchfork Media writer Hari Ashurt said "D.I. Go Pop" has "that effect where on first listen it races ahead of you before you can arrange it into something that makes sense," noting "I had the same feeling listening to Loveless for the first time-- listening to it loudly almost triggers motion sickness." Contact Music described "D. I. Go Pop" as being "made like mutated strains of C86 that, instead of bursting out into a controlled mushroom cloud, reached critical mass and became black holes, devouring anything nearby."

== Track listing ==
All tracks were written by Ian Crause, Paul Wilmott, and Rob Whatley

1. "The Last Dance" – 4:11
2. "D.I. Go Pop" – 5:07
3. "The Long Dance" – 5:25
4. "Scattered Showers" – 7:16

== Personnel ==
- Ian Crause – vocals, guitar
- Paul Wilmott – bass guitar
- Rob Whatley – drums
- Michael Johnson – producer
- Charlie McIntosh – producer
- John Rivers – engineer
- David Spero – photography
- Fuel – graphic artist
