= The Mixing It Session =

EP by Disco Inferno
- Released: 13 September 1999
- Recorded: 19 December 1994
- Studio: Maida Vale Studios, Maida Vale, London
- Genre: Post-rock
- Length: 16:22
- Label: Tugboat Records
- Producer: Philip Tagney, Disco Inferno

Disco Inferno chronology
Technicolour (1996)	The Mixing It Session (1999)	The 5 EPs (2011)

Professional ratings
Review scores
Source	Rating
AllMusic	3/5 stars

The Mixing It Session is an EP by Disco Inferno. It was released in 1999 on Tugboat Records in the United Kingdom. A six-song single taken from a BBC Radio 3 session recorded in 1994, it was released many years after Disco Inferno had disbanded.

== Critical reception ==
AllMusic wrote: "'Bird' begins innocently enough as a standard issue ambient instrumental, but by the end you find yourself at a pool party, listening to Caribbean music while submerged in the deep end. The closing 'Rats' sounds most like old Disco Inferno, thanks to Ian Crause's Vini Reilly-like guitar spirals."

== Track listing ==
All tracks are written by Ian Crause, Paul Wilmott, and Rob Whatley.

No.	Title	Length
1.	"Shark"	0:58
2.	"Elephant"	1:59
3.	"Tortoise"	2:22
4.	"Shrew"	1:19
5.	"Bird"	7:18
6.	"Rats"	2:24
Total length:		16:22

== Personnel ==
- Ian Crause – vocals, guitar, samples
- Paul Wilmott – bass
- Rob Whatley – drums
- Philip Tagney – producer
