= In Debt =

Compilation album by Disco Inferno
- Released: 1992
- Studio: Cazimi, Leyton, East London
- Genre: Post-punk
- Length: 71:38
- Label: Ché
- Producer: Charlie McIntosh, Disco Inferno and Richard Charlton

Disco Inferno chronology
Open Doors, Closed Windows (1991)	In Debt (1992)	D. I. Go Pop (1994)

In Debt is a compilation album by Disco Inferno, initially released in 1992 on Ché Records in the United Kingdom, in 1995 on Carrot Top Records in the United States, and reissued in May 2017 by Rocket Girl Records. The album combines the band's 1991 debut album, Open Doors, Closed Windows, with their first single "Entertainment"/"Arc in Round" (also released in 1991), and their 1992 Science EP. The songs "Broken" and "In the Cold" were previously unreleased.

On the 7" single for "Entertainment"/"Arc in Round", the titles of the two songs are reversed from the way they are listed on In Debt. However, the slower, shorter song mentions the phrase "arc in round" within its lyrics.

== Reception ==
Professional ratings
Review scores
Source	Rating
AllMusic	3/5 stars
The Line of Best Fit	7.5/10
Record Collector	3/5 stars

AllMusic gave the album a mixed review, describing it as "clearly inspired by such post-punk luminaries as The Durutti Column, early Wire, and above all else, Joy Division [...] on first blush it seemed unlikely the band would go further than fine nostalgia", despite singling out the track "Waking Up" as the band's "first total masterpiece, opening with an echoed bass note, astoundingly subtle percussion samples, then the deadly calm lyric 'A sky without a god is a clear blue sky.'" The review ended by calling the compilation "a striking starting point for what was to come next." Record Collector called the album "out of step, it's like they started the post-punk revival a decade or so early [...] Not bad stuff: tuneful, and even mournfully poppy if you squint."

Ned Raggett, on the other hand, ranked it at #59 on his list of "The Top 136 or So Albums of the Nineties", writing that the album kept getting better from the track "Emigré" and that "track by track you can hear the reach of ambition, about how the band realize that more can be done and don't stop -- they just keep doing it." He called the album "amazing", especially considering that the band "just kept getting even better from there on in." The Line of Best Fit wrote that the album "could be seen as an alternate ending point for post-punk, dissolving its angularity and anger in a wash of dreaming delay.". Despite criticizing its "patina of unforgiving recording techniques so common for bands with limited funds at the time, the slew of cheap or hastily deployed effects failing to mask shortcomings in performance", The Herald wrote that the band, on this compilation, "outgrow influences such as Joy Division to point the way towards a future in which they would tilt fearlessly at bliss through a painterly use of spartan guitar (later augmented by sampling) welded to rhythmic adventurousness." The Freq called the album "a masterclass of what more people should have been producing in the shadows of grunge and Britpop."

== Track listing ==
All tracks are written by Ian Crause, Paul Wilmott, and Rob Whatley.

No.	Title	Length
1.	"Entertainment"	4:50
2.	"Arc in Round"	4:00
3.	"Broken"	3:54
4.	"In the Cold" (Included on the 2017 Rocket Girl reissue only)	3:10
5.	"Emigré"	4:41
6.	"Interference"	4:33
7.	"Leisuretime"	3:37
8.	"Set Sail"	5:47
9.	"Hope to God"	1:43
10.	"Freethought"	5:31
11.	"Bleed Clean"	3:27
12.	"Next in Line"	5:04
13.	"Incentives"	3:30
14.	"Waking Up"	5:58
15.	"Glancing Away"	5:15
16.	"Fallen Down the Wire"	4:38
17.	"No Edge, No End"	5:06

== Personnel ==
- Ian Crause – vocals, guitar
- Paul Wilmott – bass guitar
- Rob Whatley – drums
- Disco Inferno – producers
- Charlie McIntosh – producer (all tracks)
- Richard Charlton – producer (tracks 14–17)
- Cactus Design – design (original release)
- Andrew Swainson – design and illustration (2017 reissue)
