= Open Doors, Closed Windows =

Studio album by Disco Inferno
- Released: 1991
- Studio: Cazimi, Leyton, East London
- Genre: Post-punk
- Length: 37:03
- Label: Ché
- Producer: Charlie McIntosh, Disco Inferno

Disco Inferno chronology
Open Doors, Closed Windows (1991)	In Debt (1992)

Professional ratings
Review scores
Source	Rating
AllMusic	3/5 stars

Open Doors, Closed Windows (stylised as Open Doors • Closed Windows) is the debut album by Disco Inferno, released in 1991 on Ché Records in the United Kingdom. The album was later released as part of the band's compilation album, In Debt, released in 1992 in the United Kingdom and in 1995 in the United States.

== Track listing ==
All tracks are written by Ian Crause, Paul Wilmott, and Rob Whatley.

No.	Title	Length
1.	"Emigré"	4:41
2.	"Interference"	4:33
3.	"Leisuretime"	3:37
4.	"Set Sail"	5:47
5.	"Hope to God"	1:43
6.	"Freethought"	5:31
7.	"Bleed Clean"	3:27
8.	"Next in Line"	5:04
9.	"Incentives"	3:30
Total length:		37:03

== Personnel ==
- Ian Crause – vocals, guitar
- Paul Wilmott – bass guitar
- Rob Whatley – drums
