= Disco Inferno (band) =

English band

- Disco Inferno. From left to right: Ian Crause, Rob Whatley and Paul Wilmott

Background information
- Also known as: D.I.
- Origin: Essex, England
- Genres: Post-rock; indie rock; experimental rock; post-punk; indietronica; neo-psychedelia; sampledelia
- Years active: 1989–1995
- Labels: Ché; Rough Trade
- Past members: Ian Crause; Paul Willmott; Rob Whatley; Daniel Gish

Disco Inferno were an English experimental rock band. Initially a trio performing in a conventional post-punk style, the band soon began to prominently incorporate digital sampling, drawing from various audio sources and pairing it with atmospheric, hypnotic songwriting. Despite being commercially unsuccessful while active, the band later acquired a cult following, with critics later regarding them as a key act in the first wave of post-rock.

== History ==
Disco Inferno was formed in 1989 in Essex by teenagers Ian Crause (guitars and vocals), Paul Willmott (bass), Daniel Gish (keyboards) and Rob Whatley (drums), although Gish soon quit the band to join Bark Psychosis, leaving Disco Inferno as a trio. They were initially a post-punk band heavily influenced by bands such as Joy Division and Wire; the band released their first album Open Doors, Closed Windows in July 1991, as well as the Science EP in October 1991. These releases, alongside their March 1991 debut single "Entertainment" / "Arc in Wound", would later be collected onto the compilation album In Debt (1992).

Crause developed an increasing interest in the production styles of bands like My Bloody Valentine and the Young Gods, as well as the Bomb Squad's hip hop production and sampling for the music of Public Enemy. With the release of the Summer's Last Sound EP in October 1992, the band's musical style changed towards sample-based electronic sounds. With the EP, the band would "hit upon a seemingly simple but ultimately world-opening idea" of writing their instruments through samplers, and, unlike their contemporaries who sampled elements of music, film dialogue or other media, would "[engage] with the whole world", using their set up to record sounds ranging from running water, wind, birdsong, boots, car crashes and angry voices. Crause had purchased a Roland S-750 sampler with his savings and started programming towards the band's sound for six months. In a 2011 interview, Wilmott recalled of the era:

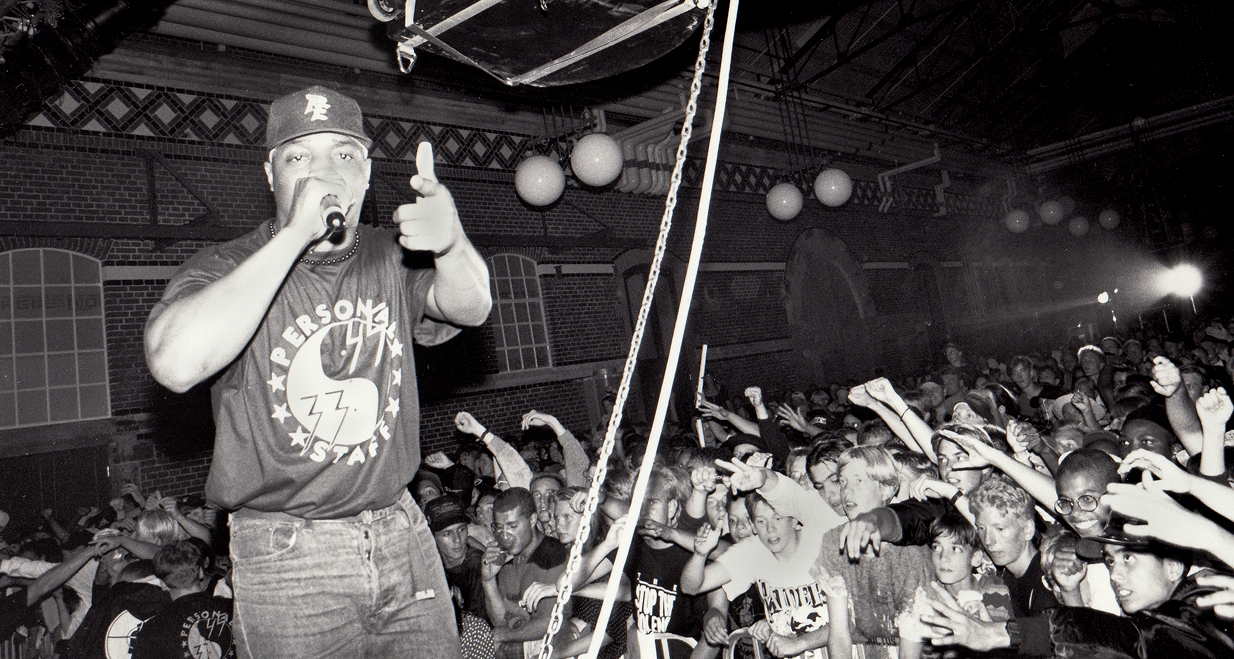
The production style of Public Enemy and the Bomb Squad was an important influence on Disco Inferno.

"We had recorded the Science EP, got some slightly better press, but were still playing to the bar staff most nights in any venue that would let us play. We were frustrated, ambitious and wanted to make an impression. Bands that we liked were using samplers and there seemed to be no reason apart from the financial that we shouldn't look to use them. We were listening to Blue Lines, Loveless, Adventures Beyond the Ultraworld; open to possibilities. We were conscious of the clone indie kid and wanted to be anything but tribal. We had been together just over three years and collectively were getting nowhere; it became a shit or bust moment. At least we would die trying. I always thought that the thing that made DI distinctive post-In Debt was the complete lack of pretence in our approach."

Summer's Last Sound was praised for its innovative and experimental sound, and the group would expand the approach with their subsequent EPs A Rock to Cling To (1992) and The Last Dance (1993), both of which were released on Rough Trade Records after their previous label Cheree ceased operations. According to Andy Kellman of AllMusic, the new label "saved the band's life, as the members believed that they were too challenging for anyone else to understand or care for." Kellman commented that, "disorienting, confusing, and highly schizophrenic, the challenging releases were in direct contrast to the prevailing Britpop scene of the time," taking "A.R. Kane's futurist pop a couple steps further and secured a devout and small following that found solace in their wildly imaginative, peerless nature." The band became characterized as one of the first post-rock bands. Crause and Whatley purchased MIDI-controlled instruments to order the replicate the samples live, with Willmott's bass serving as an anchor to the unpredictable sounds being made. AllMusic described their sample-based work as a pioneering example of indie electronic music.

In a 2011 interview, Crause explained "Most of these other what are now called post-rock groups, I think they regarded us as a kind of tinker-toy group because of the pop songs and the sampling so there was little chance of them deciding to follow us in the sampling - no critical consensus had been built for them to aspire to it - we kind of got ours from Public Enemy, who were too black and the Young Gods, who sang in French, for fuck's sake! And it wasn't seen as 'serious' enough, perhaps meaning it wasn't seen as commercially viable enough... who knows. Anyway, I did it 'cos I had the ideas."

The band's musical approach reached its peak on their second album D. I. Go Pop, released in February 1994. The album's music was harsh and concise, with an array of samples (including running water, breaking glass, car crashes and fax machines) building musical collages around the backing tracks. After D. I. Go Pop, the band opted for a more restrained approach on the Second Language EP, which also featured a new-found optimism in Crause's lyrics. The band's next single, "It's a Kid's World", sampled the drum beat from Iggy Pop's "Lust for Life" and layered in several samples of children's television theme music, such as that of Dogtanian and the Three Muskehounds, as well as the Doctor Who theme.

Despite critical acclaim, Disco Inferno attracted little commercial success. Combined artistic and financial pressure began to erode their sense of common purpose and loyalty. The band split acrimoniously in 1995, prior to the release of their final album, Technicolour, which was released in July 1996.

In September 1999, the Tugboat label released The Mixing It Session, which featured six instrumental tracks that the band had recorded for radio sessions, while One Little Indian Records reissued D. I. Go Pop and gave Technicolour a US release in 2004. In September 2011, One Little Indian released a compilation entitled The 5 EPs, featuring tracks from all five of the now out-of-print EPs released between 1992 and 1994.

== Subsequent projects ==
=== Ian Crause ===
After the split, Ian Crause formed Floorshow who recorded some material for an unreleased album which was to be called The Vertical Axis. Some of these songs later appeared on his solo singles in the early 2000s ("Elemental" and "Head Over Heels"), which featured drummer Ritchie Thomas (Dif Juz, The Jesus and Mary Chain). Crause would then spend the better part of a decade away from music and eventually left the UK to move to Bolivia.

Crause returned to music in mid-2012 with a track called "More Earthly Concerns", which resurrected Disco Inferno's sample-heavy textured approach and was released via various blogs. This was followed in November 2012 by "The Song of Phaethon", a long-form single release on Bandcamp inspired by both Greek mythology and British involvement in the Second Gulf War. Several other tracks ("The Vertical Axis", "Suns May Rise", "Black Light", and "A World of Ghosts") were released on Bandcamp in early 2013. Crause's long-delayed debut solo album, The Vertical Axis, followed in December 2013.

=== Paul Wilmott ===
Paul Wilmott formed Transformer, who recorded a cover of Wire's "Outdoor Miner", which appeared on the Wire tribute album, Whore (1996). He would later play in the short-lived London Records-signed trip hop band Lisp.

== Discography ==
=== Albums ===
- Open Doors, Closed Windows (Ché, July 1991)
- D. I. Go Pop (Rough Trade, February 1994)
- Technicolour (Rough Trade, July 1996)

=== Compilations ===
- In Debt (Ché, 1992)
- The 5 EPs (One Little Indian, September 2011)

=== Singles and EPs ===
- "Entertainment" / "Arc in Round" single (Ché, 1991)
- Science EP (Ché, 1991)
- Summer's Last Sound EP (Cheree Records, October 1992)
- "The Last Dance" / "The Long Dance" single (Rough Trade, 1993)
- A Rock to Cling To EP (Rough Trade, July 1993)
- The Last Dance EP (Rough Trade, November 1993)
- Second Language EP (Rough Trade, May 1994)
- It's a Kid's World EP (Rough Trade, September 1994)
- The Mixing It Session EP (Tugboat, September 1999)
