= The 5 EPs =

Compilation album by Disco Inferno
- Released: 12 September 2011
- Recorded: 1992–1994
- Genres: Experimental rock; post-rock; post-punk
- Length: 75:49
- Label: One Little Indian
- Producers: Charlie McIntosh; Michael Johnson

Disco Inferno chronology
| The Mixing It Session (1999) | The 5 EPs (2011) |

Professional ratings
Review scores
| Source | Rating |
|---|---|
| AllMusic | 4.5/5 stars |
| Contact Music | 4/5 stars |
| Drowned in Sound | 9/10 |
| Fact | 5/5 |
| OndaRock | 8/10 |
| Pitchfork | 9.4/10 |
| PopMatters | 9/10 |
| Rolling Stone | 4/5 stars |
| Spin | 9/10 |
| On: Yorkshire Magazine | 9/10 |

The 5 EPs is a compilation album by English post-rock band Disco Inferno, released in September 2011 on One Little Indian Records in the United Kingdom, and in November 2011 in the United States. As the title indicates, it is a collection of five Disco Inferno EPs; Summer's Last Sound (1992), A Rock to Cling To (1993), The Last Dance (1993), Second Language (1994), and It's a Kid's World (1994). All material included on the EPs is provided on the album in chronological order of release.

== Track listing ==
All lyrics are written by Ian Crause; all music is composed by Ian Crause, Paul Wilmott, and Rob Whatley.

| No. | Title | Original release | Length |
|---|---|---|---|
| 1. | "Summer's Last Sound" | Summer's Last Sound (1992) | 5:39 |
| 2. | "Love Stepping Out" | Summer's Last Sound (1992) | 6:22 |
| 3. | "A Rock to Cling To" | A Rock to Cling To (1993) | 3:52 |
| 4. | "From the Devil to the Deep Blue Sky" | A Rock to Cling To (1993) | 9:39 |
| 5. | "The Last Dance" | The Last Dance (1993) | 4:07 |
| 6. | "D. I. Go Pop" | The Last Dance (1993) | 5:08 |
| 7. | "The Long Dance" | The Last Dance (1993) | 5:26 |
| 8. | "Scattered Showers" | The Last Dance (1993) | 7:14 |
| 9. | "Second Language" | Second Language (1994) | 4:47 |
| 10. | "The Atheist's Burden" | Second Language (1994) | 3:57 |
| 11. | "At the End of the Line" | Second Language (1994) | 4:20 |
| 12. | "A Little Something" | Second Language (1994) | 2:58 |
| 13. | "It's a Kid's World" | It's a Kid's World (1994) | 4:35 |
| 14. | "A Night on the Tiles" | It's a Kid's World (1994) | 2:48 |
| 15. | "Lost in Fog" | It's a Kid's World (1994) | 4:47 |

== Personnel ==
- Ian Crause – vocals, guitar
- Paul Wilmott – bass guitar
- Rob Whatley – drums
