= 21 Singles =

Compilation album by The Jesus and Mary Chain
- Released: 27 May 2002
- Recorded: 1984–1998
- Genre: Alternative rock
- Length: 73:10
- Label: Warner Strategic Marketing
- Producer: The Jesus and Mary Chain; John Loder; Bill Price; Jim Reid; William Reid

The Jesus and Mary Chain chronology
The Complete John Peel Sessions (2000)	21 Singles (2002)	Live in Concert (2003)

Professional ratings
Review scores
Source	Rating
AllMusic	4.5/5 stars
The Rolling Stone Album Guide	4/5 stars

21 Singles is a compilation album by Scottish alternative rock band The Jesus and Mary Chain, released in the United Kingdom on 27 May 2002 by Warner Strategic Marketing, and in the United States on 2 July 2002 by Rhino Records. As the title proclaims, it contains 21 of the band's singles in chronological order from their 15-year career.

The single versions of many of these songs differ from their album versions. "April Skies" is missing the final verse from the LP version; "Happy When It Rains" is missing the final chorus; "Rollercoaster" is the original EP version, which features a drum machine and echo on the vocals; and "Come On" is an extended version.

== Track listing ==
All tracks are written by Jim Reid and William Reid, except where noted

CD (0927 46141-2)
No.	Title	Length
1.	"Upside Down"	3:01
2.	"Never Understand"	2:58
3.	"You Trip Me Up"	2:27
4.	"Just Like Honey"	3:02
5.	"Some Candy Talking"	3:18
6.	"April Skies"	3:11
7.	"Happy When It Rains"	3:05
8.	"Darklands"	5:26
9.	"Sidewalking"	3:32
10.	"Blues from a Gun"	4:43
11.	"Head On"	4:12
12.	"Rollercoaster"	3:53
13.	"Reverence"	3:42
14.	"Far Gone and Out"	2:52
15.	"Almost Gold"	3:20
16.	"Snakedriver"	3:42
17.	"Sometimes Always" (W. Reid)	2:33
18.	"Come On" (J. Reid)	3:17
19.	"I Hate Rock 'n' Roll" (W. Reid)	3:43
20.	"Cracking Up" (W. Reid)	4:43
21.	"I Love Rock 'n' Roll" (J. Reid)	2:37

=== Original releases ===
- Track 1, 9: Non-album singles. Included in 1988 compilation Barbed Wire Kisses
- Tracks 2, 3, 4: From 1985 album Psychocandy
- Track 5: From 1986 EP Some Candy Talking and the soundtrack for the 1986 film Modern Girls
- Tracks 6, 7, 8: From 1987 album Darklands
- Tracks 10, 11: From 1989 album Automatic
- Track 12: From 1992 album Honey's Dead. Also included on 1990 EP Rollercoaster
- Tracks 13, 14, 15: From 1992 album Honey's Dead
- Track 16: From 1993 compilation The Sound of Speed. Also included on 1995 compilation Hate Rock 'n' Roll
- Tracks 17, 18: From 1994 album Stoned & Dethroned
- Track 19: From 1998 album Munki. Also included on 1995 EP I Hate Rock 'n' Roll and on 1995 compilation Hate Rock 'n' Roll
- Tracks 20, 21: From 1998 album Munki

Some tracks differ from the versions on the albums listed.

== Certifications ==
Region	Certification	Certified units/sales
United Kingdom (BPI)	Silver	60,000^{‡}
^{‡} Sales+streaming figures based on certification alone.
