= List of 1980s albums considered the best =

This is a list of 1980s music albums that music journalists, magazines, and music review websites have named among the best of the 1980s, listed by the years of their release. Each album is included in at least four "best/greatest of the 1980s/all time" lists from different publications (inclusive of all genres and nationalities) as chosen by their editorial staffs or audience, and/or hall of fame awards and historical preservation measures.

== List ==
=== 1980 ===
Release Date	Album	Artist	Genre(s)	Label	Notes	Accolades
January 11, 1980	Pretenders	The Pretenders	New wave; punk rock; rock and roll	Real Records		Accolades
February 29, 1980	Crazy Rhythms	The Feelies	Post-punk; jangle pop; avant-pop; new wave	Stiff	Heavily influenced the alternative rock genre by combining post-punk and jangle pop.	Accolades
February 1980	Colossal Youth	Young Marble Giants	Post-punk	Rough Trade		Rolling Stone's "80 Greatest albums of 1980"; FACT's The 100 Best Albums of the 1980s: #17; Pitchfork's Top 100 Albums of the 1980s: #63; Spex's Die 100 Alben des Jahrhunderts: #69
April 26, 1980	Los Angeles	X	Punk rock	Slash		Accolades
May 23, 1980	I Just Can't Stop It	The Beat	Ska; two-tone; new wave	Go-Feet; Sire	Regarded as one of the most important albums of the "2-Tone and the Ska Resurrection"	UNCUT: The 500 Greatest Albums of The 1980s: #168; Diariocritico's 100 Best Albums of the 80s: #48; Spin's "Top 100 Alternative Albums": #94; Fast 'n' Bulbous - The 500 Best Albums Since 1965: #283
May 30, 1980	Peter Gabriel III	Peter Gabriel	Art rock; post-punk; post-progressive; progressive pop	Charisma (UK); Mercury (US 1980); Geffen (US 1983)		Accolades
June 1980	Underwater Moonlight	The Soft Boys	Neo-psychedelia; post-punk; new wave; psychedelic pop; jangle pop; power pop	Armageddon	Influential on the development of the neo-psychedelia and college rock music genres and on a number of bands, especially R.E.M.	Pitchfork's Top 100 Albums of the 1980s: #65; FACT's The 100 Best Albums of the 1980s: #47; Rolling Stone's "80 Greatest albums of 1980": #63; Robert Dimery's 1001 Albums You Must Hear Before You Die.
July 11, 1980	Searching For The Young Soul Rebels	Dexys Midnight Runners	New wave; blue-eyed soul	EMI; Parlophone		Accolades
July 18, 1980	Closer	Joy Division	Post-punk; new wave; gothic rock	Factory	Widely recognised as a seminal release of the post-punk era, released following the suicide of the band's lead singer and lyricist Ian Curtis. It is considered one of the darkest albums.	Accolades
July 18, 1980	Crocodiles	Echo & The Bunnymen	Post-punk; neo-psychedelia; new wave	Korova		Accolades
July 25, 1980	Back In Black	AC/DC	Hard rock; heavy metal	Albert; Atlantic		Accolades
September 2, 1980	Fresh Fruit For Rotting Vegetables	Dead Kennedys	Hardcore punk	Cherry Red; Alternative Tentacles; Faulty Products; Manifesto		NME's the 500 Greatest Albums of All Time: #365; FACT's The 100 Best Albums of the 1980s: #74; UNCUT: The 500 Greatest Albums of The 1980s: #146; laut's Best Albums of the 80s: #20
September 12, 1980	Scary Monsters (and Super Creeps)	David Bowie	Art rock; new wave; post-punk	RCA		Rankings
October 8, 1980	Remain In Light	Talking Heads	New wave; post-punk; dance-rock; afrofunk; worldbeat; art rock; psychedelic funk; progressive rock; avant-garde music	Sire	Attained widespread acclaim from critics for its sonic experimentation, rhythmic innovations, and merging of disparate genres into a cohesive whole.	Accolades and legacy
October 10, 1980	Kilimanjaro	The Teardrop Explodes	Neo-psychedelia; post-punk	Mercury		Hartbeat!'s Greatest Albums of All Time: #40; NME's Top 100 Greatest Albums of the 1980s: #17; UNCUT: The 500 Greatest Albums of The 1980s: #68; Q magazine's "100 Greatest British Albums Ever": #95
October 17, 1980	The River	Bruce Springsteen	Heartland rock; rock and roll; R&B; folk; country	Columbia		Rankings
October 20, 1980	Boy	U2	Post-punk	Island		Accolades
October 21, 1980	Killing Joke	Killing Joke	Post-punk; industrial rock	E.G.; Polydor	It is considered one of the heaviest albums.	Robert Dimery's 1001 Albums You Must Hear Before You Die.; The Guardian's "1000 Albums to Hear Before You Die"; Tom Moon's 1,000 Recordings to Hear Before You Die.; Gary Mulholland's 261 Greatest Albums Since Punk and Disco
October 1980	Ace Of Spades	Motörhead	Heavy metal; speed metal; hard rock	Bronze		Rolling Stone's 500 Greatest Albums of All Time: #408; Pitchfork's Top 200 Albums of the 1980s (2018): #71; Robert Dimery's 1001 Albums You Must Hear Before You Die.; Louder Sound's 50 Best Albums from the 1980s: #20
November 3, 1980	In The Flat Field	Bauhaus	Post-punk; gothic rock	4AD	Regarded as a key prototypical gothic music release.	Rolling Stone's "80 Greatest albums of 1980": #61; UNCUT: The 500 Greatest Albums of The 1980s: #189; Tom Moon's 1,000 Recordings to Hear Before You Die.; Classic Rock's 100 Greatest Albums Of The '80s: #100
November 28, 1980	Sound Affects	The Jam	New wave	Polydor		Accolades
December 12, 1980	Sandinista!	The Clash	Post-punk; experimental; world; reggae punk	CBS; Epic	Triple album influential in the punk rock movement with its experimental sound and eclectic genres.	Rolling Stone's 500 Greatest Albums of All Time: #323; UNCUT: The 500 Greatest Albums of The 1980s: #65; Slant's 100 Best Albums of the 1980s: #85; Diariocritico's 100 Best Albums of the 80s: #91
1980	Songs the Lord Taught Us	The Cramps	Garage rock; garage punk; psychobilly; neo-rockabilly	I.R.S.; Illegal		Robert Dimery's 1001 Albums You Must Hear Before You Die.; UNCUT: The 500 Greatest Albums of The 1980s: #72; Mojo: 80 Greatest Albums from the 80s; Ondarock's Rock Milestones List

=== 1981 ===
Release date	Album	Artist	Genre(s)	Label	Notes	Accolades
February 12, 1981	Moving Pictures	Rush	Progressive rock; hard rock	Anthem		Accolades
February 1981	My Life In The Bush Of Ghosts	Brian Eno & David Byrne	Avant-funk; sampledelia; experimental rock; Afro rock	Sire; E.G.	Heavily influential on sample-oriented music.	Reception and legacy
May 11, 1981	Computerwelt	Kraftwerk	Electronic; synth-pop; electro	Kling Klang; EMI Electrola	Concept album themed around computer technology and its rise within society. Had a significant impact on the genres of hip-hop, electronic music, and has been sampled in many notable works.	Critical reception
May 11, 1981	Nightclubbing	Grace Jones	New wave; disco; funk; reggae; dance; R&B; post-disco	Island		Legacy
May 15, 1981	Talk Talk Talk	The Psychedelic Furs	Post-punk; new wave	CBS	It is considered one of the darkest albums.	Robert Dimery's 1001 Albums You Must Hear Before You Die.; The Guardian's "1000 Albums to Hear Before You Die"; Blender: 500 CDs You Must Own Before You Die; Treble: Best Albums of the 80s
May 29, 1981	Heaven Up Here	Echo & The Bunnymen	Post-punk; neo-psychedelia	Korova		Accolades
June 19, 1981	Juju	Siouxsie And The Banshees	Post-punk; gothic rock	Polydor		UNCUT: The 500 Greatest Albums of The 1980s: #43; Pitchfork's Top 200 Albums of the 1980s (2018): #75; The Guardian's "1000 Albums to Hear Before You Die"; Robert Dimery's 1001 Albums You Must Hear Before You Die
August 31, 1981	Fire Of Love	The Gun Club	Post-punk; punk blues; gothic country; psychobilly	Ruby	Considered the first album of its kind to combine punk rock with American roots music, helped to create punk blues.	UNCUT: The 500 Greatest Albums of The 1980s: #302; Robert Dimery's 1001 Albums You Must Hear Before You Die.; Classic Rock's 100 Greatest Albums Of The '80s: #76; Wiener's 100 Best Records of the Century: #77
September 1981	Deceit	This Heat	Experimental rock; post-punk; avant-prog	Rough Trade		Critical reception and legacy UNCUT: The 500 Greatest Albums of The 1980s: #454
October 2, 1981	Discipline	King Crimson	Art rock; progressive rock; new wave; dance-rock	E.G.; Warner Bros.	Significant influence on post-progressive rock.	Pitchfork's Top 100 Albums of the 1980s: #56; UNCUT: The 500 Greatest Albums of The 1980s: #163; Classic Rock's 100 Greatest Albums Of The '80s: #40; Musikexpress's 50 Greatest Albums of The 1980s: #48
October 16, 1981	Dare	The Human League	Synth-pop; new pop; new wave	Virgin		Legacy
October 2, 1981	Ghost In The Machine	The Police	New wave; avant-pop	A&M		Accolades
November 6, 1981	Architecture & Morality	Orchestral Manoeuvres in the Dark	Synth-pop; Electropop	Dindisc		Legacy
November 1981	Damaged	Black Flag	Hardcore punk	SST	Regarded as one of the most influential punk rock records ever made for its intense depictions of rage, violence, and alienation.	Reception and legacy

=== 1982 ===
Release date	Album	Artist	Genre(s)	Label	Notes	Accolades
February 12, 1982	English Settlement	XTC	Pop; new wave	Virgin		Pitchfork's Top 100 Albums of the 1980s: #46; UNCUT: The 500 Greatest Albums of The 1980s: #301; Colin Larkin's All Time Top 1000 Albums: #884; Tom Moon's 1,000 Recordings to Hear Before You Die.
March 8, 1982	Hex Enduction Hour	The Fall	Post-punk	Kamera		NME's the 500 Greatest Albums of All Time: #201; Pitchfork's Top 100 Albums of the 1980s: #33; UNCUT: The 500 Greatest Albums of The 1980s: #49; Paste's Best Albums of the 1980s: #59
March 15, 1982	Shoot Out The Lights	Richard & Linda Thompson	British folk rock	Hannibal		Critical response
March 22, 1982	The Number Of The Beast	Iron Maiden	Heavy metal	EMI	It is considered one of the heaviest albums.	Reception and legacy
April 19, 1982	Big Science	Laurie Anderson	Art pop; electronic; minimalism	Warner Bros.; Nonesuch; Elektra		UNCUT: The 500 Greatest Albums of The 1980s: #203; Pitchfork's Top 200 Albums of the 1980s (2018): #22; Slant's 100 Best Albums of the 1980s: #44; Rolling Stone's Essential 200 Rock Records
May 4, 1982	Pornography	The Cure	Gothic rock; post-punk; neo-psychedelia	Fiction	Considered an important milestone in the development of gothic rock. It is considered one of the darkest albums.	Legacy
May 10, 1982	Rio	Duran Duran	Synth-pop; new wave; pop rock; disco rock	EMI		Rankings
May 14, 1982	Combat Rock	The Clash	Post-punk; new wave	CBS; Epic		NME's the 500 Greatest Albums of All Time: #387; UNCUT: The 500 Greatest Albums of The 1980s: #185; Slant's 100 Best Albums of the 1980s: #80; Mojo: 80 Greatest Albums from the 80s
May 28, 1982	Avalon	Roxy Music	Sophisti-pop; new wave; pop-soul	E.G.; Polydor		Critical reception
June 21, 1982	The Lexicon Of Love	ABC	Disco; new pop; pop; new wave; sophisti-pop; dance-pop; blue-eyed soul; synth-pop	Neutron		Legacy
July 2, 1982	Imperial Bedroom	Elvis Costello And The Attractions	New wave; baroque pop; art rock	F-Beat; Columbia		Rankings
September 13, 1982	The Dreaming	Kate Bush	Art rock; avant-pop; progressive pop; progressive rock	EMI		UNCUT: The 500 Greatest Albums of The 1980s: #56; Slant's 100 Best Albums of the 1980s: #71; Robert Dimery's 1001 Albums You Must Hear Before You Die.; NPR's 150 Greatest Albums Made By Women: #24
September 30, 1982	Nebraska	Bruce Springsteen	Folk; heartland rock; lo-fi; indie rock	Columbia	It is considered one of the darkest albums.	Critical reception
October 1, 1982	The Nightfly	Donald Fagen	Jazz pop; pop rock; R&B	Warner Bros.	Regarded as one of the best recorded albums for audiophiles.	Accolades
October 11, 1982	Vs.	Mission Of Burma	Post-punk; punk rock	Ace of Hearts		Pitchfork's Top 200 Albums of the 1980s (2018): #49; UNCUT: The 500 Greatest Albums of The 1980s: #132; Treble's 150 Best Albums of the 1980s: #118; Greenwood Encyclopedia of Rock History's Most Significant Rock Albums
October 27, 1982	1999	Prince	Minneapolis sound; funk; synth-pop; R&B; art pop; dance; new wave	Warner Bros.	Influential to Minneapolis sound, electro, house, and techno."	Critical reception and legacy
October 1982	The Days Of Wine And Roses	The Dream Syndicate	Post-punk; jangle pop; Paisley Underground	Ruby Records/Slash (original release); Rhino Records (reissue); Rough Trade Records		UNCUT: The 500 Greatest Albums of The 1980s: #126; Blender's 100 Greatest Indie-Rock Albums Ever: #99; Tom Moon's 1,000 Recordings to Hear Before You Die.; The Guardian's "1000 Albums to Hear Before You Die"
November 29, 1982	Thriller	Michael Jackson	Pop; post-disco; rock; funk; synth-pop; R&B	Epic	Best-selling album of all time.	Rankings

=== 1983 ===
Release date	Album	Artist	Genre(s)	Label	Notes	Accolades
January 20, 1983	Pyromania	Def Leppard	Glam metal; hard rock; heavy metal	Vertigo		Critical reception and legacy
February 28, 1983	War	U2	Post-punk	Island		Legacy
February 1983	High Land, Hard Rain	Aztec Camera	Jangle pop; pop; alternative pop; new wave; folk rock; indie pop	Rough Trade		NME's the 500 Greatest Albums of All Time: #293; FACT's The 100 Best Albums of the 1980s: #93; UNCUT: The 500 Greatest Albums of The 1980s: #59; Diariocritico's 100 Best Albums of the 80s: #88
March 23, 1983	Eliminator	ZZ Top	Hard rock; blues rock; new wave; synth-rock	Warner Bros.		Rolling Stone's 500 Greatest Albums of All Time (2003): #398; UNCUT: The 500 Greatest Albums of The 1980s: #138; Popkultur.de's 100 Best Albums of the 1980s: #41; laut's Best Albums of the 80s: #41
April 12, 1983	Murmur	R.E.M.	Jangle pop; alternative rock; post-punk; folk rock; garage rock	I.R.S.		Accolades
April 13, 1983	Violent Femmes	Violent Femmes	Folk punk; post-punk; alternative rock	Slash		Reception
May 2, 1983	Power, Corruption & Lies	New Order	Synth-pop; new wave; post-punk; synth-rock; dance-rock; dance-punk	Factory		Critical reception
June 1, 1983	Speaking In Tongues	Talking Heads	New wave; funk; art rock; funk-rock	Sire		Rolling Stone's 100 Best albums of the 1980s: #54; Slant's 100 Best Albums of the 1980s: #89; Tom Moon's 1,000 Recordings to Hear Before You Die.; Greenwood Encyclopedia of Rock History's Most Significant Rock Albums
June 17, 1983	Synchronicity	The Police	New wave; post-punk; pop	A&M		Accolades
July 25, 1983	Kill 'Em All	Metallica	Thrash metal; speed metal	Megaforce	Regarded as a groundbreaking album for the development of thrash metal.	Reception
August 8, 1983	Script Of The Bridge	The Chameleons	Post-punk; gothic rock	Statik	Regarded as influential on gothic music and Manchester bands.	Fast 'n' Bulbous's 1000 Best Albums of All Time: #128; The Guardian's "1000 Albums to Hear Before You Die"; Laut's List of Milestones; Ondarock's Rock Milestones List
September 1, 1983	Swordfishtrombones	Tom Waits	Experimental rock	Island		Reception
October 14, 1983	She's So Unusual	Cyndi Lauper	Pop rock; art pop; new wave	Portrait	Considered a pioneering achievement for a debut album by a female artist for achieving four top-five singles.	Accolades
October 21, 1983	Soul Mining	The The	Pop; post-punk; synth-pop	Some Bizzare/Epic		Legacy and accolades
November 5, 1983	Clics Modernos	Charly García	New wave; pop rock; synthpop	Interdisc; SG Discos	Significant work in Argentine rock music.	Accolades Al Borde's 250 Most Important Latin Rock Albums (2006): #3
November 10, 1983	Rebel Yell	Billy Idol	New wave; hard rock	Chrysalis		Classic Rock's 100 Greatest Albums Of The '80s: #58; Musikexpress's Greatest Albums of The 1980s; Ultimate Classic Rock's Top 100 Albums of the 1980s; Laut's List of Milestones

=== 1984 ===
Release date	Album	Artist	Genre(s)	Label	Notes	Accolades
February 20, 1984	The Smiths	The Smiths	Alternative rock; indie rock; post-punk	Rough Trade		NME's the 500 Greatest Albums of All Time: #98; FACT's The 100 Best Albums of the 1980s: #20; UNCUT: The 500 Greatest Albums of The 1980s: #52; Slant's 100 Best Albums of the 1980s: #51
April 9, 1984	Reckoning	R.E.M.	Jangle pop; alternative rock; post-punk	I.R.S.		Pitchfork's Top 100 Albums of the 1980s: #62; UNCUT: The 500 Greatest Albums of The 1980s: #99; Slant's 100 Best Albums of the 1980s: #81; Popkultur.de's 100 Best Albums of the 1980s: #80
May 4, 1984	Ocean Rain	Echo & The Bunnymen	Post-punk; new wave; neo-psychedelia; symphonic rock	Korova		NME's the 500 Greatest Albums of All Time: #276; UNCUT: The 500 Greatest Albums of The 1980s: #53; Pitchfork's Top 200 Albums of the 1980s (2018): #131; Slant's 100 Best Albums of the 1980s: #58; Popkultur.de's 100 Best Albums of the 1980s: #64; Diariocritico's 100 Best Albums of the 80s: #30
June 4, 1984	Born In The U.S.A.	Bruce Springsteen	Rock and roll; heartland rock; pop	Columbia		Rankings
June 25, 1984	Purple Rain	Prince And The Revolution	Pop; rock; R&B; funk-pop; psychedelia	Warner Bros.	Soundtrack album	Accolades
July 3, 1984	Zen Arcade	Hüsker Dü	Hardcore punk; psychedelia; indie rock; post-hardcore	SST	Regarded as instrumental in the creation of the alternative rock genre, and considered by some to be one of the greatest rock albums of all time.	Legacy
July 15, 1984	Structures From Silence	Steve Roach	Ambient; electronic; space music	Fortuna	Regarded as one of the most important ambient albums of all time.	FACT's The 100 Best Albums of the 1980s: #10; New Age Magazine's 25 Most Influential Ambient CDs; Echoes Radio's #2 Album of All Time.; Pitchfork's 33rd best ambient album of all time
July 16, 1984	Diamond Life	Sade	Smooth soul; sophisti-pop	Epic	Credited as being influential to neo soul.	Critical reception
July 27, 1984	Ride the Lightning	Metallica	Thrash Metal; Heavy Metal	Megaforce records	Widely regarded as one of the greatest Thrash Metal records of all time	Reception and legacy
July 1984	Double Nickels On The Dime	Minutemen	Hardcore punk; post-punk; post-hardcore	SST	Highly regarded for its fusion of punk rock, funk, country, spoken word and jazz, and references a variety of themes, from the Vietnam War and racism in America, to working-class experience and linguistics.	Legacy
September 1984	Stop Making Sense	Talking Heads	New wave; post-punk	Sire; Warner Bros.	Live album and soundtrack album to the concert film of the same name.	Pitchfork's Top 100 Albums of the 1980s: #68; UNCUT: The 500 Greatest Albums of The 1980s: #192; Slant's 100 Best Albums of the 1980s: #61; Popkultur.de's 100 Best Albums of the 1980s: #88
October 2, 1984	Let It Be	The Replacements	Post-punk; indie rock; alternative rock; college rock	Twin/Tone		Critical reception
October 12, 1984	Rattlesnakes	Lloyd Cole And The Commotions	Jangle pop; college rock; folk rock	Polydor (UK and Europe); Geffen (US and Canada)		UNCUT: The 500 Greatest Albums of The 1980s: #20; Diariocritico's 100 Best Albums of the 80s: #86; Robert Dimery's 1001 Albums You Must Hear Before You Die.; The Guardian's "1000 Albums to Hear Before You Die"
November 12, 1984	Hatful Of Hollow	The Smiths	Alternative rock; jangle pop; indie pop; post-punk	Rough Trade	Compilation album	NME's the 500 Greatest Albums of All Time: #100; UNCUT: The 500 Greatest Albums of The 1980s: #10; Pitchfork's Top 200 Albums of the 1980s (2018): #43; Diariocritico's 100 Best Albums of the 80s: #22
November 12, 1984	Treasure	Cocteau Twins	Ethereal wave; dream pop	4AD	Regarded as one of the greatest dream pop records.	Legacy and accolades
1984	Meat Puppets II	Meat Puppets	Cowpunk; psychedelic rock; bluegrass; folk; Americana	SST		UNCUT: The 500 Greatest Albums of The 1980s: #329; Pitchfork's Top 200 Albums of the 1980s (2018): #152; Slant's 100 Best Albums of the 1980s: #91; Robert Dimery's 1001 Albums You Must Hear Before You Die.
1984	E2-E4	Manuel Göttsching	Electronic; kosmische musik; minimalism	Inteam	Significant to the development of house, techno, and ambient techno music of the late 1980s and early 1990s.	Pitchfork's Top 100 Albums of the 1980s: #79; FACT's The 100 Best Albums of the 1980s: #4; UNCUT: The 500 Greatest Albums of The 1980s: #165; Treble's 150 Best Albums of the 1980s: #52

=== 1985 ===
Release date	Album	Artist	Genre(s)	Label	Notes	Accolades
January 1985	New Day Rising	Hüsker Dü	Post-hardcore; alternative rock; punk rock	SST	Regarded as one of the first and most influential purely alternative rock albums.	Aftermath and influence
February 11, 1985	Meat Is Murder	The Smiths	Alternative rock; indie rock; post-punk	Rough Trade	It is considered one of the darkest albums.	NME's the 500 Greatest Albums of All Time: #254; Rolling Stone magazine's list of The 500 Greatest Albums of All Time (2003): #295; UNCUT: The 500 Greatest Albums of The 1980s: #97; Robert Dimery's 1001 Albums You Must Hear Before You Die.
March 1, 1985	Songs From The Big Chair	Tears for Fears	New wave; pop rock; progressive pop; synth-pop	Mercury; Phonogram		Critical reception
May 1, 1985	Suzanne Vega	Suzanne Vega	Folk rock	A&M		Robert Dimery's 1001 Albums You Must Hear Before You Die.; Colin Larkin's All Time Top 1000 Albums: #798; Tom Moon's 1,000 Recordings to Hear Before You Die.; Rolling Stone's 100 Best Albums of the 1980s: #80
May 13, 1985	Low-Life	New Order	Synth-pop; dance-pop; post-punk	Factory		NME's the 500 Greatest Albums of All Time: #346; UNCUT: The 500 Greatest Albums of The 1980s: #78; Diariocritico's 100 Best Albums of the 80s: #82; laut's Best Albums of the 80s: #28
May 17, 1985	Brothers In Arms	Dire Straits	Rock	Vertigo		Accolades
June 17, 1985	Misplaced Childhood	Marillion	Neo-prog	EMI	Regarded as a significant benchmark in the "neo-prog" movement.	Accolades
June 1985	Steve McQueen	Prefab Sprout	Sophisti-pop	Kitchenware; Epic		Legacy
June 1985	Rites Of Spring	Rites Of Spring	Post-hardcore; emo	Dischord	Often as regarded as the first emo album.	Reception
August 5, 1985	Rum Sodomy & The Lash	The Pogues	Celtic punk; folk punk; new wave	Stiff (UK & Europe) MCA (US & Canada)		Critical reception and accolades
August 30, 1985	The Head On The Door	The Cure	Alternative rock; post-punk; art pop; new wave	Fiction		NME's the 500 Greatest Albums of All Time: #494; UNCUT: The 500 Greatest Albums of The 1980s: #34; Pitchfork's Top 200 Albums of the 1980s (2018): #109; Colin Larkin's All Time Top 1000 Albums: #833
September 16, 1985	Hounds Of Love	Kate Bush	Art pop; progressive pop; art rock; progressive rock; sophisti-pop	EMI		Accolades
September 18, 1985	Tim	The Replacements	Alternative rock; punk rock; power pop	Sire		Reception
September 23, 1985	This Nation's Saving Grace	The Fall	Post-punk	Beggars Banquet	It is considered one of the darkest albums.	Accolades
September 30, 1985	Rain Dogs	Tom Waits	Experimental rock; Americana	Island	A loose concept album about "the urban dispossessed" of New York City. Noted for its broad spectrum of musical styles and genres such as dirty blues, New Orleans funeral brass, and Kurt Weill operas.	Reception
November 18, 1985	Psychocandy	The Jesus And Mary Chain	Noise pop; alternative rock; post-punk; indie rock	Blanco y Negro	Considered a landmark recording due to its combined guitar feedback and noise with traditional pop melody and structure, influencing forthcoming shoegaze genre and alternative rock in general. It is considered one of the heaviest albums.	Reception and legacy
1985	Fear and Whiskey	The Mekons	Alternative rock; alternative country	Sin		Robert Dimery's 1001 Albums You Must Hear Before You Die.; Tom Moon's 1,000 Recordings to Hear Before You Die.; Pitchfork's Top 100 Albums of the 1980s: #74; UNCUT: The 500 Greatest Albums of The 1980s: #143

=== 1986 ===
Release date	Album	Artist	Genre(s)	Label	Notes	Accolades
January 1, 1986	Atomizer	Big Black	Noise rock; post-hardcore; industrial rock	Touch and Go, Homestead	It is considered one of the heaviest albums.	Accolades
February 4, 1986	Control	Janet Jackson	Pop; R&B	A&M	Regarded as a precursor to the new jack swing genre.	Accolades
February 17, 1986	The Colour Of Spring	Talk Talk	New wave; art pop; progressive pop; experimental pop	EMI		Pitchfork's Top 100 Albums of the 1980s: #83; UNCUT: The 500 Greatest Albums of The 1980s: #98; Slant's 100 Best Albums of the 1980s: #96; Robert Dimery's 1001 Albums You Must Hear Before You Die.
March 3, 1986	Master Of Puppets	Metallica	Thrash metal; progressive metal	Elektra	Widely considered to be one of the greatest and most influential metal albums of all time, and is credited with consolidating the American thrash metal scene. It is considered one of the heaviest albums.	Accolades and legacy
March 5, 1986	Guitar Town	Steve Earle	Country rock; roots rock; heartland rock	MCA		Rolling Stone's 500 Greatest Albums of All Time (2012): #482; UNCUT: The 500 Greatest Albums of The 1980s: #284; Popkultur.de's 100 Best Albums of the 1980s: #91; Diariocritico's 100 Best Albums of the 80s: #85
May 15, 1986	Raising Hell	Run-DMC	Hip hop; rap rock	Profile	The first Platinum and multi-Platinum hip hop record, and one of the greatest and most important albums in the history of hip hop music and culture.	Accolades
May 19, 1986	So	Peter Gabriel	Pop; art pop; art rock; progressive pop; worldbeat	Charisma; Virgin; Geffen	Acclaimed for its ability to balance musical experimentation with popular accessibility, the album broke Gabriel into the international mainstream after developing a cult following for several years.	Legacy
May 1986	EVOL	Sonic Youth	Alternative rock; post-punk; noise rock	SST	It is considered one of the heaviest albums.	Pitchfork's Top 100 Albums of the 1980s: #31; UNCUT: The 500 Greatest Albums of The 1980s: #264; Slant's 100 Best Albums of the 1980s: #82; Robert Dimery's 1001 Albums You Must Hear Before You Die.
June 16, 1986	The Queen Is Dead	The Smiths	Indie pop; jangle pop; alternative rock; indie rock; post-punk	Rough Trade		Critical reception
June 1986	London 0 Hull 4	The Housemartins	Indie rock; jangle pop	Go! Discs		NME Readers' All Time Top 100 Albums: #88; laut's Best Albums of the 80s: #50; UNCUT: The 500 Greatest Albums of The 1980s: #412; Tom Moon's 1,000 Recordings to Hear Before You Die.
July 28, 1986	Lifes Rich Pageant	R.E.M.	Jangle pop; alternative rock	I.R.S.		NME's the 500 Greatest Albums of All Time: #324; UNCUT: The 500 Greatest Albums of The 1980s: #77 Slant's 100 Best Albums of the 1980s: #52; Popkultur.de's 100 Best Albums of the 1980s: #37; Diariocritico's 100 Best Albums of the 80s: #65
August 1, 1986	Crowded House	Crowded House	Pop rock; alternative rock; new wave	Capitol/EMI		Rolling Stone Australia's 200 Greatest Albums of All Time: #7; Diariocritico's 100 Best Albums of the 80s: #93; Paste's Best Albums of the 1980s: #50; Australian Broadcasting Corporation's Top 100 Albums
August 18, 1986	Slippery When Wet	Bon Jovi	Glam metal; arena rock; hard rock; pop rock	Mercury; Vertigo		Robert Dimery's 1001 Albums You Must Hear Before You Die.; The Guardian's "1000 Albums to Hear Before You Die"; Blender: 500 CDs You Must Own Before You Die; Kerrang: 100 Albums You Must Hear Before You Die: #55
August 25, 1986	Graceland	Paul Simon	Worldbeat; pop; rock; folk; afropop	Warner Bros.	Incorporated South African styles such as isicathamiya and mbaqanga into rock and folk influences.	Accolades
September 22, 1986	Talking with the Taxman About Poetry	Billy Bragg	Folk punk	Go! Discs; Elektra		Robert Dimery's 1001 Albums You Must Hear Before You Die.; UNCUT: The 500 Greatest Albums of The 1980s: #131; NME's All Times Top 100 Albums: #89; Treble: Best Albums of the 80s
September 25, 1986	Peace Sells... But Who's Buying?	Megadeth	Thrash metal	Capitol	Regarded as having helped give prominence to extreme metal.	Legacy
October 7, 1986	Reign In Blood	Slayer	Thrash metal	Def Jam; Geffen	Regarded as among the greatest heavy metal records ever. It is considered one of the heaviest albums.	Legacy
October 27, 1986	Skylarking	XTC	Pop; rock; psychedelic	Virgin (UK); Geffen (US)	Significantly influential towards alternative pop.	Retrospective reviews and legacy
November 15, 1986	Licensed to Ill	Beastie Boys	Rap rock; hip hop	Def Jam; Columbia	The album became the first rap LP to top the Billboard 200 chart.	Critical reception
November 17, 1986	Infected	The The	Post-punk; alternative rock	Some Bizzare; Epic		UNCUT: The 500 Greatest Albums of The 1980s: #96; laut's Best Albums of the 80s: #42; Robert Dimery's 1001 Albums You Must Hear Before You Die.; Q magazine's "100 Greatest British Albums Ever": #99
November 21, 1986	I Against I	Bad Brains	Alternative metal; hardcore punk; funk rock; funk metal	SST		Accolades
1986	Horse Rotorvator	Coil	Post-industrial; psychedelia; industrial	Some Bizzare; Force & Form; Threshold House		Pitchfork's Top 100 Albums of the 1980s: #73; FACT's The 100 Best Albums of the 1980s: #13; Popkultur.de's 100 Best Albums of the 1980s: #90; Ondarock's Rock Milestones List

=== 1987 ===
Release date	Album	Artist	Genre(s)	Label	Notes	Accolades
March 9, 1987	The Joshua Tree	U2	Rock	Island		Legacy
March 30, 1987	Sign "O" The Times	Prince	R&B; funk; soul; rock; avant-pop	Paisley Park; Warner Bros.		Legacy
March 1987	Locust Abortion Technician	Butthole Surfers	Noise rock; punk rock; psychedelic rock; experimental rock; avant garde; alternative rock	Touch and Go		Robert Dimery's 1001 Albums You Must Hear Before You Die.; UNCUT: The 500 Greatest Albums of The 1980s: #266; Pitchfork's Top 200 Albums of the 1980s (2018): #189; Alternative Press's "Top 99 Albums of '85 to '95": #28
June 1, 1987	Sister	Sonic Youth	Alternative rock; noise pop; noise rock; art rock; post-punk	SST		Critical reception
July 7, 1987	Paid In Full	Eric B. & Rakim	Golden age hip hop	4th & B'way; Island	Credited as a benchmark album of golden age hip hop. Rakim's rapping, which pioneered the use of internal rhymes in hip hop, set a higher standard of lyricism in the genre and served as a template for future rappers. The album's heavy sampling by Eric B. became influential in hip hop production.	Reception and influence
June 17, 1987	Pleased To Meet Me	The Replacements	Alternative rock; power pop; post-punk	Sire		Pitchfork's Top 100 Albums of the 1980s: #71; UNCUT: The 500 Greatest Albums of The 1980s: #102; Popkultur.de's 100 Best Albums of the 1980s: #96; Paste's "The 80 Best Albums of the 1980s": #70
July 21, 1987	Appetite For Destruction	Guns N' Roses	Hard rock; heavy metal; hair metal; pop metal	Geffen	It is considered one of the heaviest albums.	Appetite for Destruction
July 27, 1987	Within the Realm of a Dying Sun	Dead Can Dance	Neoclassical Darkwave	4AD	Considered to be the definitive Neoclassical Darkwave album of the 1980s	
August 3, 1987	Hysteria	Def Leppard	Glam metal; arena rock; hard rock; pop rock	Phonogram	Regarded as one of the best pop-metal albums ever recorded.	Critical reception
August 17, 1987	Substance 1987	New Order	Dance-rock; alternative dance; post-punk; dance; pop	Factory	Regarded as one of the greatest pop albums of all time, and greatly influential in dance and alternative dance genres.	Release and reception
August 21, 1987	Diesel And Dust	Midnight Oil	Alternative rock	Sprint / Columbia		Popkultur.de's 100 Best Albums of the 1980s: #72; UNCUT: The 500 Greatest Albums of The 1980s: #397; Diariocritico's 100 Best Albums of the 80s: #50; laut's Best Albums of the 80s: #29
August 31, 1987	Darklands	The Jesus and Mary Chain	Alternative rock; post-punk	Blanco y Negro		Robert Dimery's 1001 Albums You Must Hear Before You Die.; UNCUT: The 500 Greatest Albums of The 1980s: #46; Q's "In Our Lifetime: Q's 100 Best Albums 1986–94"; Treble: Best Albums of the 80s
August 31, 1987	Document	R.E.M.	Alternative rock; jangle pop; post-punk	I.R.S.		Pitchfork's Top 100 Albums of the 1980s: #48; UNCUT: The 500 Greatest Albums of The 1980s: #115; Slant's 100 Best Albums of the 1980s: #17; Popkultur.de's 100 Best Albums of the 1980s: #70; Diariocritico's 100 Best Albums of the 80s: #28
August 31, 1987	Bad	Michael Jackson	Pop; Dance; Rock; hard rock; R&B; Soul; Funk	Epic		Accolades
September 7, 1987	Actually	Pet Shop Boys	Synth-pop; dance-pop; disco	Parlophone		Critical reception
September 28, 1987	Strangeways, Here We Come	The Smiths	Alternative rock; indie pop; indie rock	Rough Trade		NME's the 500 Greatest Albums of All Time: #47; Pitchfork's Top 100 Albums of the 1980s: #77; UNCUT: The 500 Greatest Albums of The 1980s: #69; Slant's 100 Best Albums of the 1980s: #69; Diariocritico's 100 Best Albums of the 80s: #34
September 28, 1987	Music For The Masses	Depeche Mode	Synth-pop; electropop; new wave	Mute		Critical reception
September 1987	The Perfect Prescription	Spacemen 3	Neo-psychedelia	Glass (original UK release); Fire (various UK reissues); Genius Records (original US release); Taang! (1996 US reissue)	Concept album about "a vision of a drug trip from inception to its blasted conclusion, highs and lows fully intact."	Pitchfork's Top 100 Albums of the 1980s: #50; UNCUT: The 500 Greatest Albums of The 1980s: #307; The Guardian's "1000 Albums to Hear Before You Die"; Ondarock's Rock Milestones List
October 5, 1987	The Lion And The Cobra	Sinéad O'Connor	Pop rock; art rock	Ensign; Chrysalis		UNCUT: The 500 Greatest Albums of The 1980s: #244; Pitchfork's Top 200 Albums of the 1980s (2018): #44; Slant's 100 Best Albums of the 1980s: #46; Spin's The 25 Greatest Albums of All Time: #24
October 19, 1987	Kick	INXS	New wave; pop rock; funk rock; hard rock	WEA; Mercury; Atlantic		Legacy
October 19, 1987	Secrets Of The Beehive	David Sylvian	Art rock; chamber rock	Virgin		FACT's The 100 Best Albums of the 1980s: #64; UNCUT: The 500 Greatest Albums of The 1980s: #64; Ondarock's Rock Milestones List; La Discothèque parfaite de l'odyssée du rock's Best Albums in the History of Rock
November 2, 1987	Faith	George Michael	Pop; funk; R&B; synth-pop; soul; rock; blue-eyed soul	Columbia; Epic		Accolades
November 16, 1987	Floodland	The Sisters of Mercy	Gothic rock; dark wave	Merciful Release		Robert Dimery's 1001 Albums You Must Hear Before You Die.; The Guardian's "1000 Albums to Hear Before You Die"; UNCUT: The 500 Greatest Albums of The 1980s: #55; Kerrang: 100 Albums You Must Hear Before You Die: #61
December 14, 1987	You're Living All Over Me	Dinosaur Jr.	Indie rock; alternative rock; noise rock; grunge	SST	Regarded as one of the greatest and most influential albums in alternative rock, and an influence on grunge music due to its drawling vocals paired with loud guitars and driving rhythms.	Legacy

=== 1988 ===
Release date	Album	Artist	Genre(s)	Label	Notes	Accolades
January 18, 1988	If I Should Fall from Grace with God	The Pogues	Celtic punk; folk punk; celtic rock; folk rock	Warner Music Group; Island		Robert Dimery's 1001 Albums You Must Hear Before You Die.; The Guardian's "1000 Albums to Hear Before You Die"; Tom Moon's 1,000 Recordings to Hear Before You Die.; UNCUT: The 500 Greatest Albums of The 1980s: #123
February 2, 1988	I'm Your Man	Leonard Cohen	Synth-pop; sophisti-pop	Columbia		Critical reception
March 21, 1988	Surfer Rosa	Pixies	Alternative rock; indie rock; art punk; grunge	4AD	It is considered one of the heaviest albums.	Accolades
April 5, 1988	Tracy Chapman	Tracy Chapman	Contemporary folk; folk rock; roots rock	Elektra	Helped to revive the singer-songwriter genre.	Legacy
April 25, 1988	Life's Too Good	The Sugarcubes	Alternative Rock; Dream Pop; Post-punk	One Little Independent Records	Brought international attention to the Icelandic music scene and lead singer Björk.	Accolades
May 2, 1988	Vivid	Living Colour	Hard rock; heavy metal; funk metal; alternative metal; funk rock	Epic		Rolling Stone's 100 Best Albums of the 1980s: #64; Colin Larkin's All Time Top 1000 Albums: #571; Robert Dimery's 1001 Albums You Must Hear Before You Die.; KEXP's Top Albums of the Last 50 Years (1972-2022): #637
June 28, 1988	It Takes A Nation Of Millions To Hold Us Back	Public Enemy	Hip hop; political rap; sampledelia; boom bap	Def Jam; Columbia	Regarded as one of the greatest and most influential albums of all time for its densely aggressive sound influenced by free jazz, heavy funk, and musique concrète with lead rapper Chuck D's sociopolitical rhetoric, revolutionary attitudes, and dense vocabulary.	Accolades
August 23, 1988	Nothing's Shocking	Jane's Addiction	Alternative rock; alternative metal; art rock	Warner Bros.		Critical reception
August 1988	16 Lovers Lane	The Go-Betweens	Rock; alternative rock; indie rock	Mushroom (AUS); Beggars Banquet (UK)		NME's the 500 Greatest Albums of All Time: #299; Diariocritico's 100 Best Albums of the 80s: #33; 100 Best Australian Albums: #12; Robert Dimery's 1001 Albums You Must Hear Before You Die.
September 12, 1988	Spirit Of Eden	Talk Talk	Post-rock; art rock; experimental rock; ambient	Parlophone (EMI)	Credited with pioneering the post-rock genre.	Pitchfork's Top 100 Albums of the 1980s: #34; UNCUT: The 500 Greatest Albums of The 1980s: #9; Slant's 100 Best Albums of the 1980s: #56; Diariocritico's 100 Best Albums of the 80s: #84
September 19, 1988	Tender Prey	Nick Cave & The Bad Seeds	Post-punk; gothic rock; garage punk; gothic country; blues	Mute Records		UNCUT: The 500 Greatest Albums of The 1980s: #318; Diariocritico's 100 Best Albums of the 80s: #49; Inducted to the National Film and Sound Archive's Sounds of Australia.; 100 Best Australian Albums
October 11, 1988	The Land of Rape and Honey	Ministry	Industrial rock; industrial metal	Sire		Tom Moon's 1,000 Recordings to Hear Before You Die.; Alternative Press's "Top 99 Albums of '85 to '95": #12; Fact's "The 100 Best Albums of the 1980s": #66; 33⅓ Installment: #193
October 17, 1988	Fisherman's Blues	The Waterboys	Folk rock	Ensign; Chrysalis		UNCUT: The 500 Greatest Albums of The 1980s: #265; Diariocritico's 100 Best Albums of the 80s: #47; Robert Dimery's 1001 Albums You Must Hear Before You Die.; Paste's Best Albums of the 1980s: #68
October 18, 1988	Daydream Nation	Sonic Youth	Noise rock; alternative rock	Enigma	Double album. Significantly influential on the alternative and indie rock genres.	Reception and legacy
October 1988	Superfuzz Bigmuff	Mudhoney	Grunge; garage punk	Sub Pop		Robert Dimery's 1001 Albums You Must Hear Before You Die; UNCUT: The 500 Greatest Albums of The 1980s: #474; Kerrang: 100 Albums You Must Hear Before You Die: #82; Mojo: 80 Greatest Albums from the 80s
November 8, 1988	Green	R.E.M.	Alternative rock	Warner Bros.		Robert Dimery's 1001 Albums You Must Hear Before You Die; NME's the 500 Greatest Albums of All Time: #274; UNCUT: The 500 Greatest Albums of The 1980s: #111; Treble: Best Albums of the 80s
November 10, 1988	California	American Music Club	Indie rock; americana; slowcore	Frontier		Robert Dimery's 1001 Albums You Must Hear Before You Die; The Guardian's "1000 Albums to Hear Before You Die"; UNCUT: The 500 Greatest Albums of The 1980s: #451; Ondarock's Rock Milestones List
November 15, 1988	The Trinity Session	Cowboy Junkies	Alternative country; country rock; folk blues	Latent; RCA		Accolades
November 21, 1988	Isn't Anything	My Bloody Valentine	Shoegaze; avant-rock; dream pop; noise pop; experimental pop; lo-fi	Creation	Regarded as a pioneering work of shoegazing. It is considered one of the heaviest albums.	Reception
November 21, 1988	Bummed	Happy Mondays	Madchester; psychedelic funk	Factory		Robert Dimery's 1001 Albums You Must Hear Before You Die.; The Guardian's "1000 Albums to Hear Before You Die"; UNCUT: The 500 Greatest Albums of The 1980s: #42; Q's 40 Best Albums of the '80s: #18

=== 1989 ===
Release date	Album	Artist	Genre(s)	Label	Notes	Accolades
January 10, 1989	New York	Lou Reed	Rock	Sire		UNCUT: The 500 Greatest Albums of The 1980s: #47; Slant's 100 Best Albums of the 1980s: #70; Diariocritico's 100 Best Albums of the 80s: #63; Q's 40 Best Albums of the '80s: #26
January 25, 1989	Straight Outta Compton	N.W.A	West Coast hip hop; gangsta rap; hardcore hip hop	Ruthless; Priority	Triggered the rap genre's movement toward hardcore, gangsta rap.	Rankings
January 30, 1989	Technique	New Order	Alternative dance; acid house; dance-rock	Factory		NME's the 500 Greatest Albums of All Time: #122; UNCUT: The 500 Greatest Albums of The 1980s: #30; Pitchfork's Top 200 Albums of the 1980s (2018): #112; Diariocritico's 100 Best Albums of the 80s: #29
February 6, 1989	3 Feet High And Rising	De La Soul	Art rap; progressive rap; jazz rap; psychedelic hip hop; sampledelia	Tommy Boy	Described as "the first psychedelic hip-hop record" as well as the beginning of alternative hip hop, jazz rap, progressive hip hop, and the use of the hip hop skit.	Retrospective opinion
February 27, 1989	Playing with Fire	Spacemen 3	Psychedelic rock; space rock	Fire		Robert Dimery's 1001 Albums You Must Hear Before You Die.; Pitchfork's Top 100 Albums of the 1980s: #88; Mojo: 80 Greatest Albums from the 80s; UNCUT: The 500 Greatest Albums of The 1980s: #79
March 21, 1989	Like A Prayer	Madonna	Pop	Sire; Warner Bros.		Legacy
March 21, 1989	Nick of Time	Bonnie Raitt	Americana; rock; blues rock	Capitol		Robert Dimery's 1001 Albums You Must Hear Before You Die.; Rolling Stone's 500 Greatest Albums of All Time: #492; Colin Larkin's All Time Top 1000 Albums: #615; 2015 Grammy Hall of Fame inductee.
April 10, 1989	Club Classics Vol. One	Soul II Soul	R&B	Virgin		Legacy
April 17, 1989	Doolittle	Pixies	Alternative rock	4AD; Elektra	Praised for its "quiet/loud" dynamic that influenced the development of early-1990s grunge music.	Reception
April 24, 1989	Full Moon Fever	Tom Petty	Rock	MCA		Rolling Stone's 500 Greatest Albums of All Time: #298; 2019 Grammy Hall of Fame inductee.; Colin Larkin's All Time Top 1000 Albums: #884; Greenwood Encyclopedia of Rock History's Most Significant Rock Albums
May 2, 1989	The Stone Roses	The Stone Roses	Madchester; jangle pop; neo-psychedelia; indie rock; alternative rock	Silvertone / RCA (US)	Significant towards the development of the Madchester and baggy cultural scenes.	Accolades
May 2, 1989	Disintegration	The Cure	Gothic rock; alternative rock; dream pop; post-punk; art rock	Fiction		Critical reception
July 25, 1989	Paul's Boutique	Beastie Boys	Hip hop; sampledelia	Capitol	Regarded as a landmark album of golden age hip hop and a seminal work in sample-based production.	Accolades
September 1, 1989	13 Songs	Fugazi	Post-hardcore; art punk	Dischord	Regarded as one of the best albums of the post-hardcore genre.	Accolades
September 12, 1989	Floating Into The Night	Julee Cruise	Dream pop; jazz; lounge	Warner Bros.		Critical response FACT's The 100 Best Albums of the 1980s: #24
September 12, 1989	Pump	Aerosmith	Glam metal; hard rock	Geffen		Robert Dimery's 1001 Albums You Must Hear Before You Die.; Q's "In Our Lifetime: Q's 100 Best Albums 1986–94"; Kerrang: 100 Albums You Must Hear Before You Die: #86; Spin "The 300 Best Albums of the Past 30 Years (1985-2014)"- No. 279
September 19, 1989	Rhythm Nation 1814	Janet Jackson	Pop; R&B; New Jack Swing; Funk	A&M		Slant Magazine's "Best Albums of the 80s"- No. 43 (2012); Spin "The 300 Best Albums of the Past 30 Years (1985-2014)"- No. 54; Pitchfork "The 200 Best Albums of the 1980s"- No. 30; Rolling Stone's 500 Greatest Albums of All Time- No. 339; Cleveland.com "The 80 Greatest of the 1980s by Rock Hall Inductees"- No. 58
October 16, 1989	The Sensual World	Kate Bush	Progressive pop	EMI		UNCUT: The 500 Greatest Albums of The 1980s: #410; Pitchfork's Top 200 Albums of the 1980s (2018): #59; Slant's 100 Best Albums of the 1980s: #55; Robert Dimery's 1001 Albums You Must Hear Before You Die.
October 16, 1989	Hats	The Blue Nile	Sophisti-pop; art pop; electropop; synth-pop; post-rock	Linn; A&M		UNCUT: The 500 Greatest Albums of The 1980s: #51; Pitchfork's Top 200 Albums of the 1980s (2018): #85; Q's 40 Best Albums of the '80s: #38; Colin Larkin's All Time Top 1000 Albums: #345
October 20, 1989	Pretty Hate Machine	Nine Inch Nails	Industrial rock; electro-industrial; synth-pop; EBM	TVT		Rolling Stone's 500 Greatest Albums of All Time: #453; Pitchfork's Top 200 Albums of the 1980s (2018): #76; Slant's 100 Best Albums of the 1980s: #50; Popkultur.de's 100 Best Albums of the 1980s: #69; laut's Best Albums of the 80s: #30
October 23, 1989	On Fire	Galaxie 500	Slowcore; dream pop; psychedelia	Rough Trade	Regarded as a benchmark album for the development of slowcore.	Pitchfork's Top 100 Albums of the 1980s: #16; FACT's The 100 Best Albums of the 1980s: #51; UNCUT: The 500 Greatest Albums of The 1980s: #152; Popkultur.de's 100 Best Albums of the 1980s: #38

== See also ==
- List of 1960s albums considered the best
- List of 1970s albums considered the best
- List of 1990s albums considered the best
- List of best-selling albums
- Lists of fastest-selling albums
