= List of 1960s albums considered the best =

This is a list of 1960s albums that multiple music journalists, music magazines, and professional music review websites have considered to be among the best of the 1960s and of all time, separated into the years of each album's release. The albums listed here are included on at least four separate "best/greatest of the 1960s/all time" lists from different professional publications (inclusive of all genres and nationalities) as chosen by their editorial staffs or by a sample size of an entire publication's audience, and/or hall of fame awards and historical preservation measures.

== List ==
=== 1960 ===
| Release date | Album | Artist | Genre(s) | Label | Notes | Accolades |
|---|---|---|---|---|---|---|
| February 1960 | Giant Steps | John Coltrane | Jazz; post-bop; hard bop | Atlantic | | Rolling Stone's "500 Greatest Albums of All Time" (2020): No. 232; Pitchfork's "The 200 Best Albums of the 1960s": No. 36; Uncut's "The 500 Greatest Albums of the 1960s": No. 144; Grammy Hall of Fame induction |
| July 18, 1960 | Sketches of Spain | Miles Davis | Third stream; orchestral jazz; Spanish classical music | Columbia | | Rolling Stone's "500 Greatest Albums of All Time" (2012): No. 358; Tom Moon's 1,000 Recordings to Hear Before You Die; Pitchfork's "The 200 Best Albums of the 1960s": No. 43; Uncut's "The 500 Greatest Albums of the 1960s": No. 63 |
| October 1960 | Joan Baez | Joan Baez | Folk | Vanguard | | Robert Dimery's 1001 Albums You Must Hear Before You Die; Tom Moon's 1,000 Recordings to Hear Before You Die; Grammy Hall of Fame induction; Library of Congress' National Recording Registry |
| November 15, 1960 | At Newport 1960 | Muddy Waters | Chicago blues | Chess | | Robert Dimery's 1001 Albums You Must Hear Before You Die; Tom Moon's 1,000 Recordings to Hear Before You Die; Rolling Stone's "500 Greatest Albums of All Time" (2012): No. 348; Uncut's "The 500 Greatest Albums of the 1960s": No. 398 |
| November 15, 1960 | At Last! | Etta James | R&B; blues; pop; jazz | Argo | | Rolling Stone's "500 Greatest Albums of All Time" (2020): No. 191; Pitchfork's "The 200 Best Albums of the 1960s": No. 62; Paste's "The 60 Best Albums of the 1960s": No. 38; Uncut's "The 500 Greatest Albums of the 1960s": No. 432 |

=== 1961 ===
| Release date | Album | Artist | Genre(s) | Label | Notes | Accolades |
|---|---|---|---|---|---|---|
| August 1961 | The Blues and the Abstract Truth | Oliver Nelson | Post-bop | Impulse! | | The Guardian's "1000 Albums to Hear Before You Die"; Tom Moon's 1,000 Recordings to Hear Before You Die; Uncut's "The 500 Greatest Albums of the 1960s": No. 167; Colin Larkin's All Time Top 1000 Albums: No. 333 |
| September 1961 | Free Jazz: A Collective Improvisation | Ornette Coleman | Free jazz | Atlantic | | Pitchfork's "The 200 Best Albums of the 1960s": No. 96; Uncut's "The 500 Greatest Albums of the 1960s": No. 284; Spin's "The Top 100 Alternative Albums of the 1960s": No. 7; Entertainment Weekly's "The 100 Greatest CDs of All Time": No. 84 |
| October 1961 | Sunday at the Village Vanguard | Bill Evans Trio | Jazz | Riverside | | Robert Dimery's 1001 Albums You Must Hear Before You Die; The Guardian's "1000 Albums to Hear Before You Die"; Tom Moon's 1,000 Recordings to Hear Before You Die; Uncut's "The 500 Greatest Albums of the 1960s": No. 126 |

=== 1962 ===
| Release date | Album | Artist | Genre(s) | Label | Notes | Accolades |
|---|---|---|---|---|---|---|
| January 11, 1962 | Howlin' Wolf | Howlin' Wolf | Chicago blues | Chess | | Rolling Stone's "500 Greatest Albums of All Time" (2012): No. 238; Pitchfork's "The 200 Best Albums of the 1960s": No. 96; Paste's "The 60 Best Albums of the 1960s": No. 52; Uncut's "The 500 Greatest Albums of the 1960s": No. 284 |
| March 1962 | Modern Sounds in Country and Western Music | Ray Charles | Country; rhythm and blues; countrypolitan | ABC-Paramount | | Accolades |
| April 20, 1962 | Jazz Samba | Stan Getz and Charlie Byrd | Bossa nova; samba-jazz | MGM/Verve | | Robert Dimery's 1001 Albums You Must Hear Before You Die; The Guardian's "1000 Albums to Hear Before You Die"; Colin Larkin's All Time Top 1000 Albums: No. 926; Grammy Hall of Fame induction |
| October 1962 | Green Onions | Booker T. & the M.G.'s | R&B; rock; soul | Stax; Atlantic | | Robert Dimery's 1001 Albums You Must Hear Before You Die; Tom Moon's 1,000 Recordings to Hear Before You Die; Paste's "The 60 Best Albums of the 1960s": No. 60; Library of Congress' National Recording Registry |

=== 1963 ===
| Release date | Album | Artist | Genre(s) | Label | Notes | Accolades |
|---|---|---|---|---|---|---|
| March 22, 1963 | Please Please Me | The Beatles | Merseybeat; rock and roll; pop | Parlophone | | Rankings |
| May 27, 1963 | The Freewheelin' Bob Dylan | Bob Dylan | Folk; blues | Columbia | | Legacy |
| May 1963 | Live at the Apollo | James Brown | R&B; soul | King | | Robert Dimery's 1001 Albums You Must Hear Before You Die; Rolling Stone's "500 Greatest Albums of All Time" (2020): No. 65; NME's "The 500 Greatest Albums of All Time": No. 125; The Guardian's "1000 Albums to Hear Before You Die" |
| July 1963 | The Black Saint and the Sinner Lady | Charles Mingus | Avant-garde jazz; third stream; experimental big band | Impulse! | | Robert Dimery's 1001 Albums You Must Hear Before You Die; Pitchfork's "The 200 Best Albums of the 1960s": No. 15; Blender's "500 CDs You Must Own Before You Die"; Uncut's "The 500 Greatest Albums of the 1960s": No. 187 |
| November 22, 1963 | With the Beatles | The Beatles | Merseybeat; rock and roll; pop; R&B | Parlophone | | Release and reception |
| November 22, 1963 | A Christmas Gift for You from Phil Spector | Various Artists | Christmas; pop | Philles | | Robert Dimery's 1001 Albums You Must Hear Before You Die; Rolling Stone's "500 Greatest Albums of All Time" (2012): No. 142; Pitchfork's "The 200 Best Albums of the 1960s": No. 130; Uncut's "The 500 Greatest Albums of the 1960s": No. 80 |

=== 1964 ===
| Release date | Album | Artist | Genre(s) | Label | Notes | Accolades |
|---|---|---|---|---|---|---|
| March 1964 | Getz/Gilberto | Stan Getz and João Gilberto | Jazz; bossa nova | Verve | | Robert Dimery's 1001 Albums You Must Hear Before You Die; Rolling Stone's "500 Greatest Albums of All Time" (2012): No. 447; Pitchfork's "The 200 Best Albums of the 1960s": No. 15; Uncut's "The 500 Greatest Albums of the 1960s": No. 187 |
| April 17, 1964 | The Rolling Stones | The Rolling Stones | Blues rock; British R&B; Rock and roll | Decca | | Robert Dimery's 1001 Albums You Must Hear Before You Die; NME's "All Times Top 100 Albums": No. 24; Colin Larkin's All Time Top 1000 Albums: No. 418; Uncut's "The 500 Greatest Albums of the 1960s": No. 298 |
| July 10, 1964 | A Hard Day's Night | The Beatles | Rock; pop rock; pop | Parlophone | | Critical reception and legacy |
| July 1964 | The Sidewinder | Lee Morgan | Jazz; hard bop | Blue Note | | Tom Moon's 1,000 Recordings to Hear Before You Die; Colin Larkin's All Time Top 1000 Albums: No. 584; Uncut's "The 500 Greatest Albums of the 1960s": No. 397; Grammy Hall of Fame induction |
| August 1964 | Out to Lunch! | Eric Dolphy | Avant-garde jazz | Blue Note | | The Guardian's "1000 Albums to Hear Before You Die"; Tom Moon's 1,000 Recordings to Hear Before You Die; Pitchfork's "The 200 Best Albums of the 1960s": No. 15; Uncut's "The 500 Greatest Albums of the 1960s": No. 250 |
| November 1964 | Presenting the Fabulous Ronettes | The Ronettes featuring Veronica | Pop | Philles | | Rolling Stone's "500 Greatest Albums of All Time" (2020): No. 494; Pitchfork's "The 200 Best Albums of the 1960s": No. 15; Paste's "The 60 Best Albums of the 1960s": No. 47; Uncut's "The 500 Greatest Albums of the 1960s": No. 178 |
| 1964 | Live at the Star Club, Hamburg | Jerry Lee Lewis | Rock and roll | Philips | | Robert Dimery's 1001 Albums You Must Hear Before You Die; The Guardian's "1000 Albums to Hear Before You Die"; Tom Moon's 1,000 Recordings to Hear Before You Die; Uncut's "The 500 Greatest Albums of the 1960s": No. 142 |

=== 1965 ===
| Release date | Album | Artist | Genre(s) | Label | Notes | Accolades |
|---|---|---|---|---|---|---|
| January 1965 | A Love Supreme | John Coltrane | Modal jazz; post-bop; spiritual jazz | Impulse! | | Reception and legacy |
| March 8, 1965 | The Beach Boys Today! | The Beach Boys | Chamber pop; orchestral rock | Capitol | | Release and initial reception |
| March 1965 | Here Are the Sonics | The Sonics | Garage rock; rock and roll; proto-punk | Etiquette | | Robert Dimery's 1001 Albums You Must Hear Before You Die; Pitchfork's "The 200 Best Albums of the 1960s": No. 169; Spin's "The Top 100 Alternative Albums of the 1960s": No. 34; Uncut's "The 500 Greatest Albums of the 1960s": No. 90 |
| April 1965 | Bringing It All Back Home | Bob Dylan | Folk rock; folk; blues | Columbia | | Reception |
| May 1965 | Spiritual Unity | Albert Ayler | Free jazz | ESP-Disk | | The Guardian's "1000 Albums to Hear Before You Die"; Tom Moon's 1,000 Recordings to Hear Before You Die; Pitchfork's "The 200 Best Albums of the 1960s": No. 30; Uncut's "The 500 Greatest Albums of the 1960s": No. 136 |
| June 21, 1965 | Mr. Tambourine Man | The Byrds | Folk rock | Columbia | | Robert Dimery's 1001 Albums You Must Hear Before You Die; Tom Moon's 1,000 Recordings to Hear Before You Die; Rolling Stone's "500 Greatest Albums of All Time" (2020): No. 287; Uncut's "The 500 Greatest Albums of the 1960s": No. 93 |
| August 6, 1965 | Help! | The Beatles | Pop rock; folk rock | Parlophone | | Retrospective assessments |
| August 30, 1965 | Highway 61 Revisited | Bob Dylan | Folk rock; blues rock; rock and roll | Columbia | | Reception and legacy |
| September 15, 1965 | Otis Blue/Otis Redding Sings Soul | Otis Redding | Soul; R&B; blues; rock; southern soul | Volt | | Critical reception and legacy |
| December 3, 1965 | Rubber Soul | The Beatles | Folk rock; rock; pop | Parlophone; Capitol | | Critical reception |
| December 3, 1965 | My Generation | The Who | Mod pop; garage rock; R&B; power pop; proto-punk | Brunswick; Decca | | Reception and legacy |
| 1965 | Live at the Regal | B. B. King | Blues | ABC | | Robert Dimery's 1001 Albums You Must Hear Before You Die; Rolling Stone's "500 Greatest Albums of All Time" (2020): No. 299; Tom Moon's 1,000 Recordings to Hear Before You Die; Uncut's "The 500 Greatest Albums of the 1960s": No. 282 |

=== 1966 ===
| Release date | Album | Artist | Genre(s) | Label | Notes | Accolades |
|---|---|---|---|---|---|---|
| January 17, 1966 | Sounds of Silence | Simon & Garfunkel | Folk rock | Columbia | | Pitchfork's "The 200 Best Albums of the 1960s": No. 169; Paste's "The 60 Best Albums of the 1960s": No. 50; Uncut's "The 500 Greatest Albums of the 1960s": No. 65; Library of Congress' National Recording Registry |
| February 28, 1966 | If You Can Believe Your Eyes and Ears | The Mamas & the Papas | Folk rock; pop rock; pop; soul; sunshine pop | Dunhill | | Robert Dimery's 1001 Albums You Must Hear Before You Die; The Guardian's "1000 Albums to Hear Before You Die"; Tom Moon's 1,000 Recordings to Hear Before You Die; Rolling Stone's "500 Greatest Albums of All Time" (2012): No. 112 |
| March 1966 | Black Monk Time | The Monks | Garage rock; beat; proto-punk | Polydor | | Robert Dimery's 1001 Albums You Must Hear Before You Die; Pitchfork's "The 200 Best Albums of the 1960s": No. 169; Uncut's "The 500 Greatest Albums of the 1960s": No. 75; Spin's "The Top 100 Alternative Albums of the 1960s": No. 45 |
| April 15, 1966 | Aftermath | The Rolling Stones | Rock and roll; folk rock; blues rock; art rock | Decca; London | | Reappraisal |
| May 16, 1966 | Pet Sounds | The Beach Boys | Progressive pop; chamber pop; psychedelic pop; art rock | Capitol | | Retrospective assessments and legacy |
| May 17, 1965 | Maiden Voyage | Herbie Hancock | Modal jazz; post-bop | Blue Note | | Tom Moon's 1,000 Recordings to Hear Before You Die; Pitchfork's "The 200 Best Albums of the 1960s": No. 82; Uncut's "The 500 Greatest Albums of the 1960s": No. 251; Grammy Hall of Fame induction |
| June 20, 1966 | Blonde on Blonde | Bob Dylan | Folk rock; blues rock; country rock; rock and roll | Columbia | | Reappraisal and legacy |
| June 27, 1966 | Freak Out! | The Mothers of Invention | Experimental rock | Verve | | Reception |
| July 15, 1966 | Roger the Engineer | The Yardbirds | Psychedelic rock; blues rock | Columbia | | Robert Dimery's 1001 Albums You Must Hear Before You Die; Tom Moon's 1,000 Recordings to Hear Before You Die; Rolling Stone's "500 Greatest Albums of All Time" (2012): No. 350; Uncut's "The 500 Greatest Albums of the 1960s": No. 271 |
| July 18, 1966 | Fifth Dimension | The Byrds | Folk rock; psychedelic rock; raga rock | Columbia | | Robert Dimery's 1001 Albums You Must Hear Before You Die; NME's "All Times Top 100 Albums": No. 55; Colin Larkin's All Time Top 1000 Albums: No. 290; Uncut's "The 500 Greatest Albums of the 1960s": No. 174 |
| July 22, 1966 | Blues Breakers with Eric Clapton | John Mayall with Eric Clapton | Blues rock; blues | Decca | | Robert Dimery's 1001 Albums You Must Hear Before You Die; Tom Moon's 1,000 Recordings to Hear Before You Die; Rolling Stone's "500 Greatest Albums of All Time" (2003): No. 391; Uncut's "The 500 Greatest Albums of the 1960s": No. 443 |
| August 5, 1966 | Revolver | The Beatles | Rock; pop; psychedelia; R&B | Parlophone; Capitol | | Influence and legacy |
| August 26, 1966 | Sunshine Superman | Donovan | Psychedelia; folk; psychedelic folk; raga rock | Epic | | Robert Dimery's 1001 Albums You Must Hear Before You Die; The Guardian's "1000 Albums to Hear Before You Die"; Pitchfork's "The 200 Best Albums of the 1960s": No. 199; Uncut's "The 500 Greatest Albums of the 1960s": No. 205 |
| September 16, 1966 | Wild Is the Wind | Nina Simone | Jazz; blues; folk; R&B | Philips | | Robert Dimery's 1001 Albums You Must Hear Before You Die; Rolling Stone's "500 Greatest Albums of All Time" (2020): No. 212; Pitchfork's "The 200 Best Albums of the 1960s": No. 5; Uncut's "The 500 Greatest Albums of the 1960s": No. 77 |
| October 17, 1966 | The Psychedelic Sounds of the 13th Floor Elevators | The 13th Floor Elevators | Psychedelic rock; garage rock; acid rock; R&B | International Artists | | Robert Dimery's 1001 Albums You Must Hear Before You Die; The Guardian's "1000 Albums to Hear Before You Die"; Pitchfork's "The 200 Best Albums of the 1960s": No. 88; Uncut's "The 500 Greatest Albums of the 1960s": No. 114 |
| October 24, 1966 | Parsley, Sage, Rosemary and Thyme | Simon & Garfunkel | Folk rock | Columbia | | Robert Dimery's 1001 Albums You Must Hear Before You Die; Rolling Stone's "500 Greatest Albums of All Time" (2012): No. 202; Uncut's "The 500 Greatest Albums of the 1960s": No. 225; Grammy Hall of Fame induction |
| October 28, 1966 | Face to Face | The Kinks | Rock; baroque pop; garage pop; art pop | Pye; Reprise | | Robert Dimery's 1001 Albums You Must Hear Before You Die; The Guardian's "1000 Albums to Hear Before You Die"; Colin Larkin's All Time Top 1000 Albums: No. 554; Uncut's "The 500 Greatest Albums of the 1960s": No. 225 |
| December 1966 | Fred Neil | Fred Neil | Folk rock | Capitol | | Robert Dimery's 1001 Albums You Must Hear Before You Die; The Guardian's "1000 Albums to Hear Before You Die"; Pitchfork's "The 200 Best Albums of the 1960s": No. 135; Uncut's "The 500 Greatest Albums of the 1960s": No. 170 |

=== 1967 ===
| Release date | Album | Artist | Genre(s) | Label | Notes | Accolades |
|---|---|---|---|---|---|---|
| January 4, 1967 | The Doors | The Doors | Psychedelic rock; art rock; psychedelia | Elektra | | Retrospective reception |
| January 20, 1967 | Between the Buttons | The Rolling Stones | Pop rock; psychedelic rock; baroque pop; music hall | Decca | | Rolling Stone's "500 Greatest Albums of All Time" (2012): No. 357; Blender's "500 CDs You Must Own Before You Die"; Uncut's "The 500 Greatest Albums of the 1960s": No. 96; Paul Gambaccini's Critic's Choice: Top 200 Albums: No. 183 |
| February 1, 1967 | Surrealistic Pillow | Jefferson Airplane | Folk rock; acid rock; psychedelic rock; blues rock | RCA Victor | | Robert Dimery's 1001 Albums You Must Hear Before You Die; The Guardian's "1000 Albums to Hear Before You Die"; Rolling Stone's "500 Greatest Albums of All Time" (2020): No. 471; Pitchfork's "The 200 Best Albums of the 1960s": No. 187 |
| February 6, 1967 | Younger Than Yesterday | The Byrds | Rock; folk rock; psychedelic rock; country rock; raga rock | Columbia | | Robert Dimery's 1001 Albums You Must Hear Before You Die; Rolling Stone's "500 Greatest Albums of All Time" (2012): No. 127; NME's "The 500 Greatest Albums of All Time": No. 343; Uncut's "The 500 Greatest Albums of the 1960s": No. 36 |
| March 10, 1967 | I Never Loved a Man the Way I Love You | Aretha Franklin | Southern soul | Atlantic | | Reception and legacy |
| March 1967 | Francis Albert Sinatra & Antonio Carlos Jobim | Frank Sinatra and Antônio Carlos Jobim | Bossa nova | Reprise | | Robert Dimery's 1001 Albums You Must Hear Before You Die; Tom Moon's 1,000 Recordings to Hear Before You Die; Uncut's "The 500 Greatest Albums of the 1960s": No. 335; Grammy Hall of Fame induction |
| March 1967 | The Velvet Underground & Nico | The Velvet Underground and Nico | Art rock; proto-punk; experimental rock; avant-pop; garage rock | Verve | | Reappraisal |
| May 12, 1967 (UK) August 23, 1967 (US) | Are You Experienced | The Jimi Hendrix Experience | Psychedelic rock; hard rock; acid rock; blues | Polydor; Track | | Reception and legacy |
| May 26, 1967 | Sgt. Pepper's Lonely Hearts Club Band | The Beatles | Rock; pop; psychedelia; art rock | Parlophone; Capitol | | Further public and critical recognition |
| June 6, 1967 | Moby Grape | Moby Grape | Psychedelic rock; power pop; country rock | Columbia | | Robert Dimery's 1001 Albums You Must Hear Before You Die; Rolling Stone's "500 Greatest Albums of All Time" (2012): No. 124; NME's "All Times Top 100 Albums": No. 90; Uncut's "The 500 Greatest Albums of the 1960s": No. 125 |
| August 4, 1967 | The Piper at the Gates of Dawn | Pink Floyd | Psychedelic rock; acid pop; experimental rock; space rock | EMI Columbia | | Robert Dimery's 1001 Albums You Must Hear Before You Die; Rolling Stone's "500 Greatest Albums of All Time" (2020): No. 253; NME's "The 500 Greatest Albums of All Time": No. 190; Q's "100 Greatest British Albums Ever": No. 55 |
| August 1967 | Safe as Milk | Captain Beefheart and His Magic Band | Blues rock; garage rock; R&B; acid rock; folk rock | Buddah | | Robert Dimery's 1001 Albums You Must Hear Before You Die; Pitchfork's "The 200 Best Albums of the 1960s": No. 65; Uncut's "The 500 Greatest Albums of the 1960s": No. 39; The Guardian Writers' Favourite Albums Ever |
| September 15, 1967 | Something Else by the Kinks | The Kinks | Pop; art pop; rock; psychedelia; folk; music hall | Pye | | Robert Dimery's 1001 Albums You Must Hear Before You Die; Rolling Stone's "500 Greatest Albums of All Time" (2020): No. 478; Pitchfork's "The 200 Best Albums of the 1960s": No. 124; Uncut's "The 500 Greatest Albums of the 1960s": No. 57 |
| September 25, 1967 | Strange Days | The Doors | Psychedelic rock; acid rock; psychedelic pop | Elektra | | Rolling Stone's "500 Greatest Albums of All Time" (2012): No. 409; NME's "All Times Top 100 Albums": No. 47; Sounds's "The 100 Best Albums of All Time": No. 85; Uncut's "The 500 Greatest Albums of the 1960s": No. 175 |
| October 1967 | Chelsea Girl | Nico | Folk rock; baroque pop; avant-pop; art rock; experimental rock | Verve | | Robert Dimery's 1001 Albums You Must Hear Before You Die; Pitchfork's "The 200 Best Albums of the 1960s": No. 124; Spin's "The Top 100 Alternative Albums of the 1960s": No. 91; Uncut's "The 500 Greatest Albums of the 1960s": No. 86 |
| November 1, 1967 | Forever Changes | Love | Folk rock; orchestral pop; psychedelia; baroque pop | Elektra | | Legacy |
| November 2, 1967 | Disraeli Gears | Cream | Psychedelic rock; blues rock; hard rock | Reaction | | Reception |
| November 17, 1967 | Days of Future Passed | The Moody Blues | Progressive rock; art rock; psychedelic rock; baroque pop; symphonic prog | Deram | | Colin Larkin's All Time Top 1000 Albums: No. 914; Uncut's "The 500 Greatest Albums of the 1960s": No. 384; Paul Gambaccini's Critic's Choice: Top 200 Albums: No. 107; Chris Smith's 101 Albums That Changed Popular Music |
| 27 November 1967 (US LP) 8 December 1967 (UK EP) | Magical Mystery Tour | The Beatles | Psychedelia; rock; art pop | Parlophone; Capitol | | Retrospective assessments |
| December 1, 1967 | Axis: Bold As Love | The Jimi Hendrix Experience | Psychedelic rock; pop rock; funk rock | Polydor/Track; Reprise | | Release and reception |
| December 8, 1967 | Mr. Fantasy | Traffic | Psychedelic rock | Island; United Artists | | Colin Larkin's All Time Top 1000 Albums: No. 517; NME's "All Times Top 100 Albums": No. 86; Uncut's "The 500 Greatest Albums of the 1960s": No. 119; Grammy Hall of Fame induction |
| December 27, 1967 | John Wesley Harding | Bob Dylan | Folk rock; country rock; roots rock | Columbia | | Rolling Stone's "500 Greatest Albums of All Time" (2020): No. 337; NME's "The 500 Greatest Albums of All Time": No. 343; Blender's "500 CDs You Must Own Before You Die"; Uncut's "The 500 Greatest Albums of the 1960s": No. 60 |
| December 27, 1967 | Songs of Leonard Cohen | Leonard Cohen | Folk | Columbia | | Robert Dimery's 1001 Albums You Must Hear Before You Die; Tom Moon's 1,000 Recordings to Hear Before You Die; Rolling Stone's "500 Greatest Albums of All Time" (2020): No. 195; NME's "The 500 Greatest Albums of All Time": No. 232 |

=== 1968 ===
| Release date | Album | Artist | Genre(s) | Label | Notes | Accolades |
|---|---|---|---|---|---|---|
| January 15, 1968 | The Notorious Byrd Brothers | The Byrds | Psychedelic rock; pop | Columbia | | Legacy |
| January 22, 1968 | Lady Soul | Aretha Franklin | R&B; soul | Atlantic | | Legacy |
| January 22, 1968 | Gris-Gris | Dr. John | New Orleans R&B; psychedelic funk; swamp blues; swamp rock | Atco | | Robert Dimery's 1001 Albums You Must Hear Before You Die; Tom Moon's 1,000 Recordings to Hear Before You Die; The Guardian's "1000 Albums to Hear Before You Die"; Rolling Stone's "500 Greatest Albums of All Time" (2020): No. 356 |
| January 30, 1968 | White Light/White Heat | The Velvet Underground | Noise rock; proto-punk; art rock; experimental rock; acid rock | Verve | | Rankings |
| March 4, 1968 | We're Only in It for the Money | The Mothers of Invention | Avant-garde; psychedelic rock; acid rock; experimental rock | Verve | | Critical reception |
| March 6, 1968 | The United States of America | The United States of America | Psychedelic rock; art rock; experimental rock; psychedelic pop; electronic rock | Columbia | | Robert Dimery's 1001 Albums You Must Hear Before You Die; The Guardian's "1000 Albums to Hear Before You Die"; Pitchfork's "The 200 Best Albums of the 1960s": No. 129; Uncut's "The 500 Greatest Albums of the 1960s": No. 62 |
| March 13, 1968 | Eli and the Thirteenth Confession | Laura Nyro | Pop; blue-eyed soul; folk jazz | Columbia | | Robert Dimery's 1001 Albums You Must Hear Before You Die; Tom Moon's 1,000 Recordings to Hear Before You Die; Rolling Stone's "500 Greatest Albums of All Time" (2020): No. 463; Uncut's "The 500 Greatest Albums of the 1960s": No. 58 |
| March 1968 | The Hangman's Beautiful Daughter | The Incredible String Band | Acid folk | Elektra / WEA | | Legacy and influence |
| April 3, 1968 | Bookends | Simon & Garfunkel | Folk rock | Columbia | | Accolades |
| April 19, 1968 | Odessey and Oracle | The Zombies | Baroque pop; chamber pop; psychedelic pop; pop rock; avant-pop | CBS; Date | | Legacy |
| May 6, 1968 | At Folsom Prison | Johnny Cash | Country | Columbia | | Legacy |
| May 24, 1968 | Ogdens' Nut Gone Flake | Small Faces | Psychedelia | Immediate | | Robert Dimery's 1001 Albums You Must Hear Before You Die; Colin Larkin's All Time Top 1000 Albums: No. 337; Q's "100 Greatest British Albums Ever": No. 59; Uncut's "The 500 Greatest Albums of the 1960s": No. 83 |
| 14 June 1968 (US) 9 August 1968 (UK) | Wheels of Fire | Cream | Psychedelic rock; blues rock; hard rock; proto-metal | Polydor | | Rolling Stone's "500 Greatest Albums of All Time" (2012): No. 205; Colin Larkin's All Time Top 1000 Albums: No. 757; The Times's "The 100 Best Albums of All Time": No. 44; Sean Egan's 100 Albums That Changed Music |
| June 1968 | Os Mutantes | Os Mutantes | Tropicália; psychedelic pop; psychedelic rock | Polydor | | Robert Dimery's 1001 Albums You Must Hear Before You Die; Pitchfork's "The 200 Best Albums of the 1960s": No. 51; Spin's "The Top 100 Alternative Albums of the 1960s": No. 91; Uncut's "The 500 Greatest Albums of the 1960s": No. 121 |
| July 1, 1968 | Music from Big Pink | The Band | Americana; roots rock; country rock | Capitol | | Robert Dimery's 1001 Albums You Must Hear Before You Die; Rolling Stone's "500 Greatest Albums of All Time" (2020): No. 100; Colin Larkin's All Time Top 1000 Albums: No. 452; Uncut's "The 500 Greatest Albums of the 1960s": No. 59 |
| August 12, 1968 | Cheap Thrills | Big Brother and the Holding Company | Blues rock; acid rock; psychedelic rock | Columbia | | Critical reception |
| August 1968 | Sweetheart of the Rodeo | The Byrds | Country rock; country; progressive country; roots rock; Americana | Columbia | | Robert Dimery's 1001 Albums You Must Hear Before You Die; Rolling Stone's "500 Greatest Albums of All Time" (2020): No. 274; NME's "The 500 Greatest Albums of All Time": No. 351; Uncut's "The 500 Greatest Albums of the 1960s": No. 50 |
| September 20, 1968 | Traffic | Traffic | Folk rock | Island; United Artists | | Robert Dimery's 1001 Albums You Must Hear Before You Die; The Guardian's "1000 Albums to Hear Before You Die"; Colin Larkin's All Time Top 1000 Albums: No. 312; Uncut's "The 500 Greatest Albums of the 1960s": No. 143 |
| October 16, 1968 | Electric Ladyland | The Jimi Hendrix Experience | Psychedelic rock; acid rock; hard rock; blues rock; funk; psychedelic soul | Polydor / Track; Reprise | | Reappraisal |
| November 22, 1968 | The Beatles | The Beatles | Rock; pop; folk | Apple | | Retrospective assessments |
| November 22, 1968 | The Kinks Are the Village Green Preservation Society | The Kinks | Pop; rock; baroque pop; folk-pop | Pye | | Rankings |
| November 29, 1968 | Astral Weeks | Van Morrison | Folk rock; folk jazz; progressive folk; blue-eyed soul | Warner Bros. | | Legacy and influence |
| December 6, 1968 | Beggars Banquet | The Rolling Stones | Roots rock; country blues; hard rock | Decca; London | | Reappraisal |
| December 20, 1968 | S. F. Sorrow | The Pretty Things | Psychedelic rock; psychedelic pop; experimental rock; garage rock | EMI Columbia (UK); Motown (USA) | | Robert Dimery's 1001 Albums You Must Hear Before You Die; The Guardian's "1000 Albums to Hear Before You Die"; NME's "The 100 Greatest British Albums Ever": No. 68; Uncut's "The 500 Greatest Albums of the 1960s": No. 128 |

=== 1969 ===
| Release date | Album | Artist | Genre(s) | Label | Notes | Accolades |
|---|---|---|---|---|---|---|
| January 1969 | Led Zeppelin | Led Zeppelin | Hard rock; heavy metal; blues rock | Atlantic | | Legacy |
| February 6, 1969 | The Gilded Palace of Sin | The Flying Burrito Brothers | Country rock | A&M | | Robert Dimery's 1001 Albums You Must Hear Before You Die; Rolling Stone's "500 Greatest Albums of All Time" (2020): No. 462; Pitchfork's "The 200 Best Albums of the 1960s": No. 132; Uncut's "The 500 Greatest Albums of the 1960s": No. 26 |
| February 1969 | Kick Out the Jams | MC5 | Proto-punk; garage rock; hard rock; punk rock; heavy metal | Elektra | It is considered one of the heaviest albums ever. | Robert Dimery's 1001 Albums You Must Hear Before You Die; Tom Moon's 1,000 Recordings to Hear Before You Die; Rolling Stone's "500 Greatest Albums of All Time" (2020): No. 349; Uncut's "The 500 Greatest Albums of the 1960s": No. 55 |
| March 31, 1969 | Dusty in Memphis | Dusty Springfield | Pop; rhythm and blues; blue-eyed soul | Atlantic; Philips | | Release and reception |
| March 1969 | The Velvet Underground | The Velvet Underground | Folk rock; pop; rock | MGM | | Rankings |
| March 1969 | Happy Trails | Quicksilver Messenger Service | Psychedelic rock; acid rock | Capitol | | Robert Dimery's 1001 Albums You Must Hear Before You Die; Rolling Stone's "500 Greatest Albums of All Time" (2020): No. 161; Colin Larkin's All Time Top 1000 Albums: No. 83; Uncut's "The 500 Greatest Albums of the 1960s": No. 76 |
| April 28, 1969 | Chicago Transit Authority | Chicago | Jazz rock; progressive rock; blues rock | Columbia | | Robert Dimery's 1001 Albums You Must Hear Before You Die; Tom Moon's 1,000 Recordings to Hear Before You Die; Grammy Hall of Fame induction; Library of Congress' National Recording Registry |
| April 1969 | Happy Sad | Tim Buckley | Psychedelic folk; jazz fusion; folk jazz | Elektra | | Robert Dimery's 1001 Albums You Must Hear Before You Die; NME's "The 500 Greatest Albums of All Time": No. 398; Colin Larkin's All Time Top 1000 Albums: No. 954; Uncut's "The 500 Greatest Albums of the 1960s": No. 79 |
| May 3, 1969 | Stand! | Sly and the Family Stone | Psychedelic soul; funk rock; funk; progressive soul; psychedelic funk | Epic | | Robert Dimery's 1001 Albums You Must Hear Before You Die; Tom Moon's 1,000 Recordings to Hear Before You Die; Rolling Stone's "500 Greatest Albums of All Time" (2020): No. 299; Uncut's "The 500 Greatest Albums of the 1960s": No. 25 |
| May 14, 1969 | Everybody Knows This Is Nowhere | Neil Young with Crazy Horse | Country rock; folk rock; garage rock; hard rock; acid rock | Reprise | | Robert Dimery's 1001 Albums You Must Hear Before You Die; Rolling Stone's "500 Greatest Albums of All Time" (2020): No. 407; NME's "The 500 Greatest Albums of All Time": No. 398; Uncut's "The 500 Greatest Albums of the 1960s": No. 20 |
| May 19, 1969 | Tommy | The Who | Rock; hard rock | Track; Decca | | Legacy and reappraisal |
| May 19, 1969 | Oar | Skip Spence | Psychedelic folk; folk rock; psychedelic rock | Columbia | | Robert Dimery's 1001 Albums You Must Hear Before You Die; Tom Moon's 1,000 Recordings to Hear Before You Die; Colin Larkin's All Time Top 1000 Albums: No. 510; Uncut's "The 500 Greatest Albums of the 1960s": No. 89 |
| May 29, 1969 | Crosby, Stills & Nash | Crosby, Stills & Nash | Folk rock | Atlantic | | Robert Dimery's 1001 Albums You Must Hear Before You Die; Rolling Stone's "500 Greatest Albums of All Time" (2020): No. 161; Colin Larkin's All Time Top 1000 Albums: No. 83; Uncut's "The 500 Greatest Albums of the 1960s": No. 76 |
| June 2, 1969 | From Elvis in Memphis | Elvis Presley | Rock; soul; country; blues | RCA Victor | | Robert Dimery's 1001 Albums You Must Hear Before You Die; Rolling Stone's "500 Greatest Albums of All Time" (2020): No. 322; The Guardian's "1000 Albums to Hear Before You Die"; Uncut's "The 500 Greatest Albums of the 1960s": No. 64 |
| June 16, 1969 | Trout Mask Replica | Captain Beefheart and His Magic Band | Experimental rock; blues; avant-garde | Straight | | Reception and legacy |
| June 16, 1969 | At San Quentin | Johnny Cash | Country; rock and roll | Columbia | | Robert Dimery's 1001 Albums You Must Hear Before You Die; The Guardian's "1000 Albums to Hear Before You Die"; Uncut's "The 500 Greatest Albums of the 1960s": No. 89; Grammy Hall of Fame induction |
| June 1969 | Hot Buttered Soul | Isaac Hayes | Progressive soul; psychedelic soul | Enterprise | | Robert Dimery's 1001 Albums You Must Hear Before You Die; Rolling Stone's "500 Greatest Albums of All Time" (2020): No. 373; The Guardian's "1000 Albums to Hear Before You Die"; Uncut's "The 500 Greatest Albums of the 1960s": No. 34 |
| July 3, 1969 | Five Leaves Left | Nick Drake | Folk; folk-pop; chamber folk; folk rock | Island | | Accolades |
| July 3, 1969 | Unhalfbricking | Fairport Convention | British folk rock | Island | | Reception |
| July 30, 1969 | In a Silent Way | Miles Davis | Jazz fusion; jazz rock | Columbia | | Robert Dimery's 1001 Albums You Must Hear Before You Die; Tom Moon's 1,000 Recordings to Hear Before You Die; Pitchfork's "The 200 Best Albums of the 1960s": No. 9; Uncut's "The 500 Greatest Albums of the 1960s": No. 27 |
| August 5, 1969 | The Stooges | The Stooges | Proto-punk; garage rock; hard rock | Elektra | | Robert Dimery's 1001 Albums You Must Hear Before You Die; The Guardian's "1000 Albums to Hear Before You Die"; Rolling Stone's "500 Greatest Albums of All Time" (2020): No. 488; Uncut's "The 500 Greatest Albums of the 1960s": No. 10 |
| August 7, 1969 | Green River | Creedence Clearwater Revival | Swamp rock; blues rock; rock and roll; Americana | Fantasy | | Robert Dimery's 1001 Albums You Must Hear Before You Die; Tom Moon's 1,000 Recordings to Hear Before You Die; Rolling Stone's "500 Greatest Albums of All Time" (2003): No. 95; Uncut's "The 500 Greatest Albums of the 1960s": No. 94 |
| September 22, 1969 | The Band | The Band | Roots rock; folk rock; country rock; americana | Capitol | | Reception |
| September 26, 1969 | Abbey Road | The Beatles | Rock; pop | Apple | | Retrospective |
| October 10, 1969 | In the Court of the Crimson King | King Crimson | Progressive rock; art rock | Island; Atlantic; E.G. | | Robert Dimery's 1001 Albums You Must Hear Before You Die; The Guardian's "1000 Albums to Hear Before You Die"; Colin Larkin's All Time Top 1000 Albums: No. 193; Uncut's "The 500 Greatest Albums of the 1960s": No. 47 |
| October 10, 1969 | Hot Rats | Frank Zappa | Jazz fusion; blues rock; instrumental rock | Bizarre/Reprise | | Robert Dimery's 1001 Albums You Must Hear Before You Die; Mojo's "The 100 Greatest Albums Ever Made": No 89; Rolling Stone's "500 Greatest Albums of All Time" (2020): No. 373; Uncut's "The 500 Greatest Albums of the 1960s": No. 34 |
| October 22, 1969 | Led Zeppelin II | Led Zeppelin | Hard rock; blues rock; heavy metal | Atlantic | | Legacy and reappraisal |
| October 29, 1969 | Willy and the Poor Boys | Creedence Clearwater Revival | Swamp rock; blues rock; Southern rock; Americana | Fantasy | | Robert Dimery's 1001 Albums You Must Hear Before You Die; Tom Moon's 1,000 Recordings to Hear Before You Die; Pitchfork's "The 200 Best Albums of the 1960s": No. 78; Uncut's "The 500 Greatest Albums of the 1960s": No. 110 |
| November 7, 1969 | Scott 4 | Scott Walker | Orchestral pop; baroque pop; avant-garde | Philips | | Robert Dimery's 1001 Albums You Must Hear Before You Die; Pitchfork's "The 200 Best Albums of the 1960s": No. 45; Uncut's "The 500 Greatest Albums of the 1960s": No. 23; The Guardian's Writers' Favourite Albums Ever |
| November 10, 1969 | Live/Dead | Grateful Dead | Acid rock; psychedelic rock; jam rock | Warner Bros.-Seven Arts | | Robert Dimery's 1001 Albums You Must Hear Before You Die; Rolling Stone's "500 Greatest Albums of All Time" (2012): No. 247; Pitchfork's "The 200 Best Albums of the 1960s": No. 60; Uncut's "The 500 Greatest Albums of the 1960s": No. 141 |
| November 28, 1969 | Let It Bleed | The Rolling Stones | Hard rock; blues; country blues | Decca; London | | Reception |
| December 1969 | Liege & Lief | Fairport Convention | British folk rock | Island; A&M | | Robert Dimery's 1001 Albums You Must Hear Before You Die; Tom Moon's 1,000 Recordings to Hear Before You Die; NME's "The 500 Greatest Albums of All Time": No. 110; Uncut's "The 500 Greatest Albums of the 1960s": No. 61 |

== See also ==
- List of 1970s albums considered the best
- List of 1980s albums considered the best
- List of 1990s albums considered the best
- List of best-selling albums
- Lists of fastest-selling albums
