= Barbed Wire Kisses =

Compilation album by The Jesus and Mary Chain
- Released: 18 April 1988
- Recorded: 1984–1987
- Genre: Alternative rock
- Length: 62:20
- Label: Blanco y Negro
- Producer: John Loder; Jim Reid; William Reid

The Jesus and Mary Chain chronology
Darklands (1987)	Barbed Wire Kisses (1988)	Automatic (1989)

Singles from Barbed Wire Kisses
- 1. "Sidewalking" Released: March 1988

Professional ratings
Review scores
Source	Rating
AllMusic	4/5 stars
The Rolling Stone Album Guide	2.5/5 stars

Barbed Wire Kisses (B-Sides and More) is a compilation album by Scottish alternative rock band The Jesus and Mary Chain. It was released on 18 April 1988 by Blanco y Negro Records. The album contains singles, B-sides and rare tracks. Throughout the 1980s the band was known for their prodigious output in these formats, often in limited editions which quickly went out of print. This album collects many of those releases spanning the band's career up to that point.

The band's cover of Bo Diddley's "Who Do You Love?" was used on the soundtrack to the 1988 film Earth Girls Are Easy. "Mushroom" is a cover of a Can song. "Sidewalking" was voted one of the best singles of 1988 by Musician magazine.

The title comes from a line in the song "Cherry Came Too" from the Darklands album.

This album was not included in the 2006 remasterings of the group's back catalogue. All tracks from this compilation, except for "Mushroom" and "Just Out of Reach" (which appears in a re-recorded form on Barbed Wire Kisses) are now included on The Power of Negative Thinking: B-Sides & Rarities.

Rhino Records re-released Barbed Wire Kisses as a 2-LP Limited edition of 8,000 copies on 180-gram blood red vinyl for 2015 Black Friday Record Store Day.

The name is also used for Zoë Howe's 2014 biography of the band.

== Track listing ==
All tracks written by Jim Reid and William Reid, except where noted.

=== LP (BYN 15) ===
Side 1

1. "Kill Surf City" – 3:09 ^{G}
2. "Head" – 3:48 ^{C}
3. "Rider" – 2:10 ^{F}
4. "Hit" – 3:26 ^{D}
5. "Don't Ever Change" – 3:30 ^{E}
6. "Just Out of Reach" – 3:04 ^{J}
7. "Happy Place" – 2:22 ^{H}
8. "Psychocandy" – 2:52 ^{D}

Side 2

1. "Sidewalking" – 3:32 ^{I}
2. "Who Do You Love?" (Bo Diddley) – 4:03 ^{G}
3. "Surfin' U.S.A." (Chuck Berry, Brian Wilson) – 2:57 ^{F}
4. "Everything's Alright When You're Down" – 2:37 ^{H}
5. "Upside Down" – 2:57 ^{A}
6. "Taste of Cindy (Acoustic)" – 1:58 ^{D}
7. "Swing" – 2:23 ^{E}
8. "On the Wall (Porta Studio Demo/F. Hole)" – 4:46 ^{F}

=== Cassette (BYNC 15) ===
Side 1

1. "Kill Surf City" – 3:09 ^{G}
2. "Head" – 3:48 ^{C}
3. "Rider" – 2:10 ^{F}
4. "Hit" – 3:26 ^{D}
5. "Don't Ever Change" – 3:30 ^{E}
6. "Just Out of Reach" – 3:04 ^{J}
7. "Happy Place" – 2:22 ^{H}
8. "Psycho Candy" – 2:52 ^{D}
9. "Cracked" – 3:43 ^{C}
10. "Mushroom (Live 1986)" (Can) – 3:16 ^{G}

Side 2

1. "Sidewalking" – 3:32 ^{I}
2. "Who Do you Love?" (Bo Diddley) – 4:03 ^{G}
3. "Surfin' U.S.A." (Chuck Berry, Brian Wilson) – 2:57 ^{F}
4. "Everything's Alright When You're Down" – 2:37 ^{H}
5. "Upside Down" – 2:57 ^{A}
6. "Taste of Cindy (Acoustic)" – 1:58 ^{D}
7. "Swing" – 2:23 ^{E}
8. "On the Wall (Demo)" – 4:46 ^{F}
9. "Here It Comes Again" – 2:31 ^{F}
10. "Bo Diddley is Jesus" – 3:16 ^{G}

=== CD (BYNC 15) ===
1. "Kill Surf City" – 3:09 ^{G}
2. "Head" – 3:48 ^{C}
3. "Rider" – 2:10 ^{F}
4. "Hit" – 3:26 ^{D}
5. "Don't Ever Change" – 3:30 ^{E}
6. "Just Out of Reach" – 3:04 ^{J}
7. "Happy Place" – 2:22 ^{H}
8. "Psycho Candy" – 2:52 ^{D}
9. "Sidewalking" – 3:32 ^{I}
10. "Who Do You Love?" (Diddley) – 4:03 ^{G}
11. "Surfin' U.S.A." (Berry, Wilson) – 2:57 ^{F}
12. "Everything's Alright When You're Down" – 2:37 ^{H}
13. "Upside Down" – 2:57 ^{A}
14. "Taste of Cindy (Acoustic)" – 1:58 ^{D}
15. "Swing" – 2:23 ^{E}
16. "On the Wall (Demo)" – 4:46 ^{F}
17. "Cracked" – 3:43 ^{C}
18. "Here It Comes Again" – 2:31 ^{F}
19. "Mushroom (Live 1986)" (Can) – 3:16 ^{G}
20. "Bo Diddley Is Jesus" – 3:16 ^{G}

Note

- Some, but not all, of the releases of the album credit the short noise instrumental "F-Hole" (from the "Happy When It Rains" 12" single) as appearing directly after the demo version of "On the Wall," but it's there on all of the releases. "F-Hole" appears as its own track on the 2008 compilation The Power of Negative Thinking: B-Sides & Rarities.

=== Original releases ===
- ^{A} The band's first, non-album single "Upside Down" from 1984.
- ^{B} B-side to "You Trip Me Up" from 1985.
- ^{C} B-sides to "Just Like Honey" from 1985.
- ^{D} B-sides to "Some Candy Talking" EP from 1986.
- ^{E} Darklands session out-takes.
- ^{F} B-sides to "Darklands" EP from 1987.
- ^{G} B-sides to "April Skies" from 1987.
- ^{H} B-sides to "Happy When It Rains" from 1987.
- ^{I} Released as non-album single "Sidewalking" in 1988.
- ^{J} Previously unreleased. Rerecorded version. The original version appears on "You Trip Me Up" from 1985.

== Personnel ==
The Jesus and Mary Chain

- Jim Reid – vocals, guitar, production
- William Reid – vocals, guitar, production

Additional personnel

- John Loder – production
- Helen Backhouse – design
- Andrew Catlin – photography

== Charts ==
Chart performance for Barbed Wire Kisses
Chart (1988–1990)	Peak position
Australian Albums (ARIA)	97
European Albums (Music & Media)	37
Finnish Albums (Suomen virallinen lista)	38
New Zealand Albums (RMNZ)	29
UK Albums (OCC)	9
US Billboard 200	192

== Certifications ==
Certifications for Barbed Wire Kisses
Region	Certification	Certified units/sales
United Kingdom (BPI)	Gold	100,000^{^}
^{^} Shipments figures based on certification alone.
