= 500 Greatest Albums of All Time =

500 Greatest Albums of All Time may refer to:

- Rolling Stone's 500 Greatest Albums of All Time
- NME's The 500 Greatest Albums of All Time
