= Sidewalking =

1988 single by the Jesus and Mary Chain

Single by the Jesus and Mary Chain
- B-side: "Taste of Cindy" (live)
- Released: March 1988
- Length: 3:32
- Label: Blanco y Negro
- Songwriters: William Reid, Jim Reid
- Producers: William Reid, Jim Reid, John Loder

The Jesus and Mary Chain singles chronology
"Darklands" (1987)	"Sidewalking" (1988)	"Blues from a Gun" (1989)

"Sidewalking" is a song by Scottish alternative rock band the Jesus and Mary Chain. It was released as a standalone single in March 1988 and included in the compilation album Barbed Wire Kisses, released in April 1988. The single is also included on their 2002 compilation album. 21 Singles. The track reflected the band's interest in hip hop and samples the drumbeat from the 1984 single "Roxanne's Revenge" by Roxanne Shante as a loop. "Sidewalking" reached number 30 on the UK Singles Chart, number 20 in Ireland, and number 23 in New Zealand.

== Track listings ==
All tracks were written by Jim Reid and William Reid.

7-inch single

1. "Sidewalking"
2. "Taste of Cindy" (recorded live in Detroit)

12-inch single

1. "Sidewalking" (extended version)
2. "Sidewalking" (7-inch mix)
3. "Taste of Cindy" (recorded live in Detroit)
4. "April Skies" (recorded live in Detroit)

UK mini-CD single

1. "Sidewalking" – 3:33
2. "Sidewalking" (extended version) – 7:50
3. "Taste of Cindy" (recorded live in Detroit) – 1:40
4. "Sidewalking" (Chilled to the Bone) – 3:34

== Personnel ==
The Jesus and Mary Chain

- Jim Reid – vocals, guitar, producer
- William Reid – guitar, producer

Additional personnel

- John Loder – producer
- Westwood One – engineer (live tracks)
- Helen Backhouse – design
- Andrew Catlin – photography

== Charts ==
Chart (1988)	Peak position
Europe (Eurochart Hot 100)	95
Ireland (IRMA)	20
New Zealand (Recorded Music NZ)	23
UK Singles (OCC)	30
