= Head On (song) =

1989 single by the Jesus and Mary Chain

Single by the Jesus and Mary Chain

from the album Automatic
- Released: November 1989
- Genre: Post-punk; noise pop
- Length: 4:11
- Label: Blanco y Negro
- Songwriters: William Reid; Jim Reid
- Producers: William Reid; Jim Reid

The Jesus and Mary Chain singles chronology
"Blues from a Gun" (1989)	"Head On" (1989)	"Reverence" (1992)

Alternative Cover
- Cover of 7" number 2

Alternative Cover
- Cover of 7" number 3

Alternative Cover
- Cover of 7" number 4

"Head On" is a song written by Jim Reid and William Reid of the Scottish alternative rock band the Jesus and Mary Chain. It was originally recorded for the group's 1989 album Automatic and was released as a single in November 1989.

== Background ==
In the UK, it was released in seven different formats, including four 7" singles. One 7" single was released per week, and one of them included a cardboard box to house the full set.

The single reached #57 in the UK. In the US, it was broadcast a lot on Alternative radio, so it reached #2 on the Billboard Modern Rock chart which listed the most played songs on college radios. In Australia, the single peaked at #102 on the ARIA singles chart.

The song has been covered by several other groups, most notably the American alternative rock band Pixies on their fourth studio album, Trompe Le Monde. The melody and lyrics of the chorus are also quoted by Liz Phair in "Slave," the fourth song from the Sooty tape of her self-produced Girly-Sound tapes.

"Head On" appeared in the Superman & Lois episode of the same name when Kyle requests the song at the Valentine's Day dance.

== Musical style ==
Denise Sullivan of AllMusic described the song as "blueprint post-punk in the tradition of Joy Division/New Order." The song relies on a synth bass and a drum machine, latter of which provides a pop-influenced new wave beat. While the song lacks the layers of guitar feedback of the band's previous works, it features a "1950s-style riff," provided by William Reid. The song's style was also compared to the sound of the Beach Boys.

== Track listing ==
All tracks written by Jim Reid and William Reid, except where noted.

7" (NEG42)

1. "Head On" – 4:11
2. "In The Black" – 2:59

7" (NEG42XB)

1. "Head On" – 4:11
2. "Terminal Beach" – 2:25

7" (NEG42Y)

1. "Head On" – 4:11
2. "Deviant Slice" – 3:00

7" (NEG42Z)

1. "Head On" – 4:11
2. "I'm Glad I Never" (Lee Hazlewood) – 1:31

12" (NEG42TE)

1. "Head On" – 4:11
2. "In The Black" – 2:59
3. "Terminal Beach" – 2:25

CD3 (NEG42CD)

1. "Head On" – 4:11
2. "In The Black" – 2:59
3. "Drop (Acoustic Remix)" – 1:52
4. "Break Me Down" – 2:29

Cassette (NEG42C)

1. "Head On" – 4:11
2. "In The Black" – 2:59

== Personnel ==
=== The Jesus and Mary Chain ===
- Jim Reid – vocals, guitar, synthesizer, drum programming, producer
- William Reid – guitar, synthesizer, drum programming, producer

=== Additional personnel ===
- Alan Moulder – engineer ("Head On", "Drop")

== Charts ==
Chart (1989–90)	Peak position
UK Singles (OCC)	57
US Alternative Airplay (Billboard)	2

== Pixies version ==
"Head On"

Single by Pixies

from the album Trompe le Monde
- A-side: "Head On" (Single Mix)
- B-side: "Planet of Sound" (Live); "Tame" (Live); "Debaser" (Live)
- Released: 1991
- Recorded: 1991
- Studio: Master Control, Burbank; Pacifique, Burbank; Studio des dames, Paris; Blackwing, London
- Genre: Alternative rock
- Length: 2:14
- Label: Elektra
- Songwriters: Jim Reid; William Reid
- Producer: Gil Norton

Pixies singles chronology
"Letter to Memphis" (1991)	"Head On" (1991)	"Debaser" (1997)

"Head On" was covered by the American alternative rock band Pixies for their 1991 album Trompe le Monde. Pixies' version was released as a single in 1991.

The band chose to cover the song because Pixies frontman Black Francis liked the song. J Mascis of Dinosaur Jr. commented, "He [Francis] wasn't that hip when it came to modern music. He heard 'Head On' and just loved it. The Pixies were a strange band."

=== Music video ===
By 1991, Pixies refused to film music videos for their singles. After a long debate with Elektra Records, their record company in the United States, the band relented and agreed to film a video, as long as the song was done completely live. Peter Lubin, the A&R representative of Elektra at the time, later explained the situation:

By completely live that means full band, vocals, cameras roll, video's done by the end of two minutes and 13 seconds. One take, that's it. So those became the ground rules, that was the only way you were going to get a Pixies video for 'Head On' or anything else.

Lubin then came up with the idea for the video. Twelve cameras would be placed, "dividing" each band member into three blocks. Frontman Black Francis was happy with this idea, so Scott Litt was then hired to produce the video. After the video had been filmed, Elektra invited the "whole decision-making team from MTV" to view it. The video was added to MTV's rotation, later receiving the "Breakthrough Video" award.

=== Track listing ===
All songs written by Black Francis, except where noted.

1. "Head On" (Single Mix) (Jim Reid and William Reid) – 2:20
2. "Planet of Sound" (Live at Brixton Academy, 26 July 1991) – 2:26
3. "Tame" (Live at Brixton Academy, 26 July 1991) – 2:27
4. "Debaser" (Live in Chicago, 9 August 1989) – 2:41

=== Charts ===
Chart (1992)	Peak position
US Alternative Airplay (Billboard)	6
