= Automatic (The Jesus and Mary Chain album) =

Studio album by the Jesus and Mary Chain
- Released: 9 October 1989
- Recorded: 1989
- Studio: Sam Therapy (West London)
- Genre: Alternative rock
- Length: 43:26
- Label: Blanco y Negro
- Producers: Jim Reid; William Reid

The Jesus and Mary Chain chronology
Barbed Wire Kisses (1988)	Automatic (1989)	Honey's Dead (1992)

Singles from Automatic
- 1. "Blues from a Gun" Released: September 1989; 2. "Head On" Released: November 1989

Automatic is the third studio album by Scottish alternative rock band the Jesus and Mary Chain, released on 9 October 1989 by Blanco y Negro Records. The group on this record consists of the core duo of brothers William and Jim Reid, with a drum machine providing percussion and synthesised bass. The only other credited musician was Richard Thomas, who joined the touring version of the Jesus and Mary Chain as a drummer. Thomas drummed on "Gimme Hell" and was a former member of Dif Juz. He also made appearances on Cocteau Twins' 1986 album Victorialand and This Mortal Coil's 1986 album Filigree & Shadow.

== Reception ==
Professional ratings
Review scores
Source	Rating
AllMusic	3/5 stars
Chicago Tribune	3.5/4 stars
Los Angeles Times	4/5 stars
Mojo	2/5 stars
NME	8/10
Pitchfork	7.8/10
Q	4/5 stars
The Rolling Stone Album Guide	3/5 stars
Select	5/5
The Village Voice	B−

Although released to generally mixed reviews at the time (with the aforementioned synthesised drums and bass being the biggest point of contention), Automatic contains "Blues from a Gun", their most successful single in America up to that point, and "Head On" (later covered by Pixies). Critical and fan reception has improved with time. Pitchfork wrote in 2006 that "conventional wisdom wrongly calls [Automatic] the dud" of the band's discography, but that in hindsight the album "feels like a career peak".

The last two tracks, "Drop" and "Sunray", do not appear on vinyl LP versions of the album.

The album is name-checked in the lyrics of "The Authority Song" by emo band Jimmy Eat World on their 2001 album Bleed American in the line, "the DJ never has it, JAMC Automatic."

== Track listing ==
All tracks written by Jim Reid and William Reid.

LP (BYN 20), limited gatefold LP (BYN 20W) and cassette (BYNC 20)

Side one

1. "Here Comes Alice" – 3:53
2. "Coast to Coast" – 4:13
3. "Blues from a Gun" – 4:44
4. "Between Planets" – 3:27
5. "UV Ray" – 4:06

Side two

1. "Her Way of Praying" – 3:46
2. "Head On" – 4:11
3. "Take It" – 4:34
4. "Halfway to Crazy" – 3:40
5. "Gimme Hell" – 3:20

CD (BYNCD 20)

1. "Here Comes Alice" – 3:53
2. "Coast to Coast" – 4:13
3. "Blues from a Gun" – 4:44
4. "Between Planets" – 3:27
5. "UV Ray" – 4:06
6. "Her Way of Praying" – 3:46
7. "Head On" – 4:11
8. "Take It" – 4:34
9. "Halfway to Crazy" – 3:40
10. "Gimme Hell" – 3:20
11. "Drop" – 1:58
12. "Sunray" – 1:34

== Personnel ==
=== The Jesus and Mary Chain ===
- Jim Reid – vocals (tracks 2, 4–10), guitar, synthesiser, drum programming, production
- William Reid – vocals (tracks 1, 3, 11), guitar, synthesizer, drum programming, production

=== Additional personnel ===
- Alan Moulder – engineering
- Jamie Harley – recording assistance
- Lee Curle – recording assistance
- Dick Meaney – mixing assistance
- Richard Thomas – drums on "Gimme Hell"
- Ryan Art – design
- Steve Mitchell – photography
- Andrew Catlin – photography

== Charts ==
Chart performance for Automatic
Chart (1989–1990)	Peak position
Australian Albums (ARIA)	89
European Albums (Music & Media)	47
New Zealand Albums (RMNZ)	48
Swedish Albums (Sverigetopplistan)	42
UK Albums (Official Charts)	11
US Billboard 200	105

As of May 1998, the album had sold 60,000 copies in the United States, according to Nielsen SoundScan.
