= Hartbeat! =

German music magazine

Hartbeat! was a German music magazine that existed from 1984 to 1998. The magazine carried articles on punk rock, power pop, garage rock, beat music, rock music, and psychedelic music styles. The time period of the music detailed ranged from the 1960s to the late 1990s.

The magazine was published in English at irregular intervals. The editor was Hans-Jürgen Klitsch, who also wrote two books on the German Beatscene of the 1960s: "Shakin' All Over - Die Beatmusik in der Bundesrepublik Deutschland 1963 - 1967" (High Castle 2000; revised 2001) und "Otto & die Beatlejungs - Die Beatszene der 60er Jahre zwischen Oldenburg, Emden und Wilhelmshaven" (Isensee 2008).
