= Darklands (album) =

Studio album by the Jesus and Mary Chain
- Released: 31 August 1987
- Studio: Livingston (London)
- Genres: Alternative rock; post-punk; folk rock
- Length: 35:51
- Label: Blanco y Negro
- Producers: William Reid; Bill Price; John Loder

The Jesus and Mary Chain chronology
Psychocandy (1985)	Darklands (1987)	Barbed Wire Kisses (1988)

Singles from Darklands
- 1. "April Skies" Released: April 1987; 2. "Happy When It Rains" Released: August 1987; 3. "Darklands" Released: October 1987

Professional ratings
Review scores
Source	Rating
AllMusic	4.5/5 stars
Mojo	4/5 stars
Paste	4/5 stars
Pitchfork	7.8/10
Q	4/5 stars
Record Collector	5/5 stars
The Rolling Stone Album Guide	4/5 stars
Select	4/5
Spin Alternative Record Guide	8/10
The Village Voice	B+

Darklands is the second studio album by Scottish alternative rock band the Jesus and Mary Chain, released on 31 August 1987 by Blanco y Negro Records. The album is the band's first to use drum machines, replacing live drummer Bobby Gillespie, who had left to pursue a career as the frontman of Scottish rock band Primal Scream. Lead vocals are performed by Jim Reid, with the exception of "Darklands", "Nine Million Rainy Days" and "On the Wall", which are sung by William Reid.

Darklands reached number five on the UK Albums Chart, the band's highest-peaking album on the chart to date. The album was included in the book 1001 Albums You Must Hear Before You Die.

Primal Scream later recorded a cover version of the album's title track as a B-side to their 1998 single "If They Move, Kill 'Em".

== Reception ==
Ned Raggett of Allmusic observed. "Feeling no doubt burdened by the various claims of being the new Sex Pistols, and likely fed up with accusations that the walls of feedback were their own trick, the Reid brothers underwent a bit of a rethink with Darklands. The end result must have fallen squarely between two camps -- hardly eligible for sunny commercial airplay, not quite as flailing as the earliest efforts -- but, from a distance, this is an appealing, enjoyable record." noting a "often stripped away" "calmer classic rock twang and groove,". Though he felt "the changes on Darklands can be overstated -- the basic formula at the heart of the band (inspired plagiarism of melodies and lyrics alike, plenty of reverb, etc.) stayed pretty much the same" comparing its foundation to its predecessor Psychocandy (1985) despite its different sound and mood, and concluded. "Darklands is no Psychocandy in the end -- nothing the band released later ever was -- but it's still a good listen."

Nitsuh Abebe of Pitchfork praised the album in a 7.8 review saying "With Gillespie gone and replaced by an unobtrusive drum machine, the band turns down the noise attitude and works on developing the back-to-basics pop songs that were always underneath. The singles (“Happy When it Rains”) are a joy, big hooks laced with just the right amount of vintage leather-and-shades cool."

Robert Christgau of The Village Voice gave the album a B+ and observed, "they know damn well their putatively erotic-existential despair speaks to thrill-seeking normals by making chaos rhyme." and felt it was "inevitable for them to take their folk-simple hook-ditties in an acoustic direction," but concluded "Yet as a normal I miss the feedback--without all that chaos, the trick just doesn't come off death-defying enough."

== Track listing ==
=== Original release ===
All tracks are written by William Reid and Jim Reid.

Side one
No.	Title	Length
1.	"Darklands"	5:29
2.	"Deep One Perfect Morning"	2:43
3.	"Happy When It Rains"	3:36
4.	"Down on Me"	2:36
5.	"Nine Million Rainy Days"	4:29

Side two
No.	Title	Length
6.	"April Skies"	4:00
7.	"Fall"	2:28
8.	"Cherry Came Too"	3:06
9.	"On the Wall"	5:05
10.	"About You"	2:31

=== 2011 expanded edition ===
Disc one (bonus tracks)
No.	Title	Length
11.	"Some Candy Talking"	3:18
12.	"Taste of Cindy" (acoustic version)	2:00
13.	"Psychocandy"	2:54
14.	"Hit"	3:29
15.	"Darklands" (BBC Radio session)	4:40
16.	"Down on Me" (BBC Radio session)	2:29
17.	"Deep One Perfect Morning" (BBC Radio session)	2:37
18.	"Fall" (BBC Radio session)	3:11
19.	"In the Rain" (BBC Radio session)	2:28
20.	"Happy Place" (BBC Radio session)	2:24

Disc two
No.	Title	Length
1.	"Kill Surf City"	3:12
2.	"Bo Diddley Is Jesus"	3:17
3.	"Who Do You Love"	4:05
4.	"Everything's Alright When You're Down"	2:39
5.	"Shake"	2:01
6.	"Happy When It Rains" (demo)	3:46
7.	"Happy Place"	2:24
8.	"F.Hole"	1:07
9.	"Rider"	2:12
10.	"On the Wall" (Portastudio demo)	3:41
11.	"Surfin' USA" (April outtake)	2:58
12.	"Here It Comes Again"	2:32
13.	"Walk and Crawl"	2:24
14.	"Some Candy Talking" (NME version)	3:10
15.	"Mushroom"	3:19
16.	"The Hardest Walk" (soundtrack version)	3:12
17.	"Don't Ever Change"	3:32
18.	"Swing"	2:25
19.	"Darklands" (with strings)	5:27
20.	"Interview (Janice Long)"	14:36

DVD
No.	Title	Length
1.	"Some Candy Talking" (music video)	3:25
2.	"April Skies" (music video)	3:59
3.	"Kill Surf City" (music video)	3:16
4.	"Happy When It Rains" (music video)	3:33
5.	"Darklands" (music video)	3:59
6.	"April Skies" (live on Top of the Pops)	3:41
7.	"April Skies" (live on Villa Tempo)	3:47
8.	"Happy When It Rains" (live on The Roxy)	3:36

== Personnel ==
Credits adapted from the liner notes of Darklands.

=== The Jesus and Mary Chain ===
- Jim Reid – vocals (all tracks except 1, 5, 9)
- William Reid – vocals (tracks 1, 5, 9); production (all tracks)

=== Additional personnel ===
- Bill Price – production (tracks 1, 3, 4, 6, 8, 9)
- John Loder – production (tracks 5, 7, 10)
- Tony Harris – engineering (track 2)
- Tim Broad – video photography
- John Maybury – video photography
- Helen Backhouse – design
- Andrew Catlin – photography

== Charts ==
Chart performance for Darklands
Chart (1987)	Peak position
Australian Albums (Kent Music Report)	81
Dutch Albums (Album Top 100)	64
European Albums (Music & Media)	38
New Zealand Albums (RMNZ)	20
Swedish Albums (Sverigetopplistan)	38
Swiss Albums (Schweizer Hitparade)	23
UK Albums (Official Charts)	5
US Billboard 200	161

== Certifications ==
Certifications for Darklands
Region	Certification	Certified units/sales
United Kingdom (BPI)	Gold	100,000^{^}
^{^} Shipments figures based on certification alone.
