= Darklands (song) =

1987 single by the Jesus and Mary Chain

Single by the Jesus and Mary Chain

from the album Darklands
- B-side: "Rider"
- Released: 26 October 1987
- Length: 5:23
- Label: Blanco y Negro
- Songwriters: Jim Reid, William Reid
- Producers: William Reid, Bill Price

The Jesus and Mary Chain singles chronology
"Happy When It Rains" (1987)	"Darklands" (1987)	"Sidewalking" (1988)

12-inch cover

Darklands

EP by the Jesus and Mary Chain
- Released: 26 October 1987
- Length: 13:42
- Label: Blanco y Negro
- Producer: William Reid, Bill Price

The Jesus and Mary Chain chronology
Happy When It Rains (1987)	''Darklands'' (1987)	Rollercoaster (1990)

"Darklands" is a song by Scottish rock band the Jesus & Mary Chain and the third single from their album of the same name. The single was released in October 1987 by Blanco y Negro Records on 7-inch vinyl, 10-inch vinyl, 12-inch vinyl and as a CD single. The 10-inch and the CD were entitled Darklands E.P.

The single reached number 33 on the UK Singles Chart and number 23 on the Irish Singles Chart. William Reid was the producer for all the tracks with Bill Price co-producing "Darklands" and John Loder co-producing "Rider", "On the Wall (Porta Studio Demo)", "Here It Comes Again" and "Surfin' U.S.A. (April out-take)".

== Track listings ==
All tracks were written by Jim Reid and William Reid except where noted.

7-inch single

1. "Darklands"
2. "Rider"
3. "On the Wall" (Porta Studio demo)

12-inch single

1. "Darklands"
2. "Rider"
3. "Surfin' U.S.A." (April out-take) (Chuck Berry, Brian Wilson)
4. "On the Wall" (Porta Studio demo)

10-inch and CD EP

1. "Darklands" – 5:23
2. "Rider" – 2:10
3. "Here It Comes Again" – 2:30
4. "On the Wall" (Porta Studio demo) – 3:39

== Personnel ==
The Jesus and Mary Chain

- Jim Reid – vocals, guitar
- William Reid – vocals, guitar, producer

Additional personnel

- Bill Price – producer ("Darklands")
- John Loder – producer ("Rider", "Here It Comes Again")
- Linda Reid – design
- Helen Backhouse – design

== Charts ==
Chart (1987)	Peak position
Europe (European Hot 100 Singles)	89
Ireland (IRMA)	23
UK Singles (OCC)	33
