= Psychocandy =

Studio album by the Jesus and Mary Chain
- Released: 18 November 1985
- Recorded: March–April 1985
- Studios: Southern, Wood Green, London
- Genres: Noise pop; alternative rock; post-punk; indie rock
- Length: 38:55
- Label: Blanco y Negro
- Producers: The Jesus and Mary Chain

The Jesus and Mary Chain chronology
Psychocandy (1985)	Darklands (1987)

Singles from Psychocandy
- 1. "Never Understand" Released: 18 February 1985; 2. "You Trip Me Up" Released: 20 May 1985; 3. "Just Like Honey" Released: 30 September 1985

Psychocandy is the debut studio album by Scottish rock band the Jesus and Mary Chain. It was released on 18 November 1985 by Blanco y Negro Records. The album is considered a landmark recording: its combination of guitar feedback and noise with traditional pop melody and structure proved influential on the forthcoming shoegaze genre and alternative rock in general.

The album reached No. 31 on the UK Albums Chart and was preceded by three charting 1985 singles: "Never Understand", "You Trip Me Up", and "Just Like Honey". The band moved away from its abrasive sound with their follow-up album, 1987's Darklands.

== Background and recording ==
After quitting their jobs in 1980, brothers Jim and William Reid formed the Jesus and Mary Chain with bass player Douglas Hart. Taking inspiration from German industrial band Einstürzende Neubauten, girl group the Shangri-Las, and the album The Velvet Underground & Nico, they bought a Portastudio multitrack recorder in 1983 when their father lost his job in a local factory and gave the brothers £300 from his redundancy money. The band recorded a demo tape containing the songs "Upside Down" and "Never Understand" which was heard by Glaswegian musician Bobby Gillespie, who in turn passed it on to his friend Alan McGee of Creation Records. McGee was impressed with the tape and invited the band to play at a Creation Records showcase event in London, becoming the band's manager shortly afterwards.

Following more London concerts, the Jesus and Mary Chain entered Alaska Studios in Waterloo, South London, and recorded their debut single, "Upside Down". Released by Creation Records in November 1984 and featuring a B-side produced by Slaughter Joe, "Upside Down" sold out its initial pressing and ended the year by being placed at number 37 in John Peel's Festive Fifty. After recruiting Gillespie as their drummer in late 1984, the Jesus and Mary Chain signed to the WEA subsidiary label Blanco y Negro, which had been established by Rough Trade founder Geoff Travis. The band entered Island Studios to record with engineer Stephen Street but the sessions proved to be fruitless and the band returned to Alaska Studios for the recording of their second single, "Never Understand". The single was released by Blanco y Negro in February 1985, and in March that year they began recording their debut album with engineer John Loder at Southern Studios in Wood Green, North London. Psychocandy was recorded in six weeks and totalled £17,000 in recording and production costs.

== Music and lyrics ==
Psychocandy contains fourteen tracks with a total running time of thirty-nine minutes. The music has been described as "bubblegum pop drowned in feedback", that fused "melody with obnoxious bursts of white noise." Dan Weiss of Paste magazine said the album "sounded like the 1910 Fruitgum Company and Joy Division arm-wrestling in a sheet metal factory, with slabs of white noise guarding candy-toy melodies the Reid Brothers didn't want you to get sick of too quickly." Radio X characterized the sound as "moving away from the squealing feedback that characterised [the band's] early live shows and leaning more towards classic 60s pop."

Critics have noted the influence of classic 1960s pop groups such as the Beach Boys and the Rolling Stones alongside the work of rock bands the Velvet Underground, the Stooges and Suicide on the album.

Lead vocals are handled by Jim Reid on this album, with the exception of "It's So Hard", sung by William Reid.

== Release ==
The album includes the singles "Never Understand", "You Trip Me Up" and "Just Like Honey". Following reissue on CD in August 1986, the bonus track "Some Candy Talking", which was originally released on the namesake EP, was included on the album, only on the UK Blanco y Negro CDs released in 1986 and 1997; in the US, it was released on CD by Reprise in 1986 and American Recordings in 1993 without the bonus track. In 2006, the album was remastered and released in DualDisc format without "Some Candy Talking" to conform with the original playlist. In 2011, it was re-released (along with the other five studio albums) by Edsel in collaboration with Rhino as a two-CD set with extra tracks (singles, B-sides, demos and John Peel Sessions) and a DVD (NTSC, all-region).

== Reception and legacy ==
Professional ratings
Review scores
Source	Rating
AllMusic	5/5 stars
Mojo	5/5 stars
Pitchfork	9.6/10
Q	5/5 stars
Record Collector	5/5 stars
Rolling Stone	4.5/5 stars
The Rolling Stone Album Guide	5/5 stars
Select	5/5
Spin Alternative Record Guide	9/10
The Village Voice	A−

On release Psychocandy received favourable reviews. Writing for NME, Andy Gill described the album as "a great searing citadel of beauty whose wall of noise, once scaled, offers access to endless vistas of melody and emotion", while William Shaw of Smash Hits called it "a wonderful LP which should bring the Scottish brats the success they've missed out on so far". Tim Holmes of Rolling Stone praised the band as "a perfect recombinant of every Edge City outlaw ethic ever espoused in rock." In the end of year-roundups, the album placed at number two in NME's list of best albums of 1985, number 3 in The Face, and number 5 in Melody Maker.

Subsequently, the album has frequently appeared in "best ever" album lists, such as Q magazine's "100 Greatest British Albums Ever", where it placed at number 88 in 2000. In 2006, Q magazine placed the album at number 23 in its "40 Best Albums of the '80s" list. In 2003, the album was ranked number 268 on Rolling Stone magazine's "The 500 Greatest Albums of All Time" list, and 269 in a 2012 revised list. The magazine also ranked the album number 45 on its list of the 100 Best Debut Albums of All Time. AllMusic described the album as one that "created a movement without meaning to."

In 2002 Pitchfork listed Psychocandy as the 23rd best album of the 1980s. In their 2018 update of the list, the album was listed at number 40. Slant Magazine listed the album at number 38 in its "Best Albums of the 1980s" list, saying, "Shaping fuzz into a potent, tactile instrument, The Jesus and Mary Chain helped establish the style of distortion-laden fogginess that would eventually become the foundation for shoegaze." The album was also included in the book 1001 Albums You Must Hear Before You Die.

In 2016, Paste Magazine named the album the 21st-best post-punk album of all time. Staff writer Dan Weiss said: "Predating Sleigh Bells or Times New Viking or the catchall-turned-festival-name "noise pop" was this journey to the logical extreme. [...] It's as difficult to memorize as it is to resisting singing along with when it's on, as if every listen is your first." In 2018, PopMatters included Psychocandy in their list of the "12 Essential 1980s Alternative Rock Albums" saying, "it may still be the only noise pop LP anyone ever really needs to own". In 2025, Radio X included the album in its list of "The 25 best indie debut albums of the 1980s".

== Track listing ==
All tracks are written by Jim Reid and William Reid, except where noted.

Side one
No.	Title	Length
1.	"Just Like Honey"	3:03
2.	"The Living End"	2:16
3.	"Taste the Floor"	2:56
4.	"The Hardest Walk"	2:40
5.	"Cut Dead"	2:47
6.	"In a Hole"	3:02
7.	"Taste of Cindy"	1:42

Side two
No.	Title	Length
1.	"Never Understand"	2:57
2.	"Inside Me"	3:09
3.	"Sowing Seeds"	2:50
4.	"My Little Underground"	2:31
5.	"You Trip Me Up"	2:26
6.	"Something's Wrong"	4:01
7.	"It's So Hard"	2:37

Note

- The 1986 CD release contains the extra track "Some Candy Talking", between "Taste of Cindy" and "Never Understand".

2011 2CD/1DVD reissue bonus tracks
No.	Title	Writer(s)	Length
15.	"Suck"		2:08
16.	"Ambition"	Vic Godard	3:31
17.	"Just Out of Reach"		2:09
18.	"Boyfriend's Dead"		1:43
19.	"Head"		3:53
20.	"Cracked"		3:48

2011 reissue disc two
No.	Title	Writer(s)	Length
1.	"Upside Down"		3:00
2.	"Vegetable Man"	Syd Barrett	3:35
3.	"In a Hole" (John Peel radio session, 23 October 1984)		2:41
4.	"You Trip Me Up" (John Peel radio session, 23 October 1984)		2:07
5.	"Never Understand" (John Peel radio session, 23 October 1984)		3:08
6.	"Taste the Floor" (John Peel radio session, 23 October 1984)		3:08
7.	"The Living End" (John Peel radio session, 3 February 1985)		2:15
8.	"Inside Me" (John Peel radio session, 3 February 1985)		3:01
9.	"Just Like Honey" (John Peel radio session, 3 February 1985)		2:49
10.	"Some Candy Talking" (John Peel radio session, 29 October 1985)		3:13
11.	"Psychocandy" (John Peel radio session, 29 October 1985)		2:01
12.	"You Trip Me Up" (John Peel radio session, 29 October 1985)		2:41
13.	"Cut Dead" (John Peel radio session, 29 October 1985)		2:47
14.	"Up Too High" (Portastudio demo, 1984/85)		3:44
15.	"Upside Down" (Portastudio demo, 1984/85)		3:10
16.	"Never Understand" (Portastudio demo, 1984/85)		3:18
17.	"Taste the Floor" (Portastudio demo, 1984/85)		3:06
18.	"In a Hole" (Portastudio demo, 1984/85)		2:42
19.	"Something's Wrong" (Portastudio demo, 1984/85)		3:27
20.	"Just Like Honey" (Alaska Studios demo, June 1985)		2:58
21.	"The Living End" (Alaska Studios demo, June 1985)		2:16
22.	"My Little Underground" (Alaska Studios demo, June 1985)		2:33
23.	"Never Understand" (alternate version)		3:25
24.	"Jesus Fuck"		2:30

2011 reissue bonus DVD
No.	Title	Length
1.	"Never Understand" (music video)	3:02
2.	"You Trip Me Up" (music video)	2:27
3.	"Just Like Honey" (music video)	3:02
4.	"In a Hole" (The Old Grey Whistle Test, 12 March 1985)	3:40
5.	"Riot at North London Polytechnic – interview and live clips" (The NewMusic, 15 March 1985)	6:46
6.	"Interview" (VRT, Belgium, 17 March 1985)	2:29
7.	"Never Understand" (VRT, Belgium, 17 March 1985)	2:54
8.	"Just Like Honey" (The Tube, 11 November 1985)	3:08
9.	"Inside Me" (The Tube, 11 November 1985)	2:44
10.	"Upside Down: The Creation Records Story" (film trailer)	2:21

== Personnel ==
All personnel credits adapted from Psychocandy's liner notes.

The Jesus and Mary Chain

- Jim Reid – vocals (1–13), guitar
- William Reid – vocals (15), guitar
- Douglas Hart – bass
- Bobby Gillespie – drums

Additional musicians

- Karen Parker – backing vocals (1)
- Laurence Verfaillie – backing vocals (7)

Technical

- The Jesus and Mary Chain – production
- John Loder – engineering
- Flood – engineer (8)
- Alan Moulder – assistant engineer (8)

Design

- Greg Allen – art direction
- Alastair Indge – sleeve photography
- Bleddyn Butcher – sleeve photography
- Chris Clown – sleeve photography
- Mike Laye – sleeve photography
- Rona McIntosh – sleeve photography
- Stuart Cassidy – sleeve photography

== Charts ==
Chart performance for Psychocandy
Chart (1985–1986)	Peak position
Australian Albums (Kent Music Report)	87
Canada Top Albums/CDs (RPM)	92
Dutch Albums (Album Top 100)	47
European Albums (Music & Media)	81
New Zealand Albums (RMNZ)	35
UK Albums (Official Charts)	31
US Billboard 200	188

2025 chart performance for Psychocandy
Chart (2025)	Peak position
Hungarian Physical Albums (MAHASZ)	36

== Certifications ==
Certifications for Psychocandy
Region	Certification	Certified units/sales
United Kingdom (BPI)	Gold	100,000^{^}
^{^} Shipments figures based on certification alone.
