= 1,000 Recordings to Hear Before You Die =

2008 book by Tom Moon

- Author: Tom Moon
- Language: English
- Genre: Reference work
- Publisher: Workman Publishing Company
- Publication date: 2008
- Publication place: United States
- Media type: Print (Paperback)
- Pages: 992 pp
- ISBN: 978-0-7611-3963-8
- OCLC: 179803341
- Dewey Decimal: 016.78026/6 22
- LC Class: ML156.9 .M66 2008

1,000 Recordings to Hear Before You Die is a musical reference book written by Tom Moon, published in 2008.

== Synopsis ==
It consists of a list of recordings, mostly albums (with some singles), arranged alphabetically by artist or composer. Each entry in the list is accompanied by a short essay followed by genre classifications, Moon's choices for "key tracks" from albums, the next recommended recording from the same artist or composer, and pointers to recordings on the list by other artists that are similar or otherwise related.

Moon also includes a postscript of "108 more recordings to know about".

Moon was a music critic at The Philadelphia Inquirer for 20 years, and has contributed to Rolling Stone, Blender, and other publications.

== Genres and contents ==
Rock recordings dominate the list, which also includes a broad range of classical, jazz, blues, folk, country, R&B, electronica, hip-hop, gospel, opera, musicals, pop, vocals, and world music. Unlike another popular music encyclopedia, 1001 Albums You Must Hear Before You Die, Moon allows the inclusion of albums that may contain non-original material, such as compilations, greatest-hits packages, Broadway musical cast recordings, and soundtracks.

== See also ==
- Album era
- 1001 Albums You Must Hear Before You Die
