= Just Like Honey =

Single by the Jesus and Mary Chain

from the album Psychocandy
- B-side: "Head"
- Released: September 1985
- Genre: Noise pop; shoegaze
- Length: 3:03
- Label: Blanco y Negro
- Songwriter(s): William Reid, Jim Reid
- Producer(s): The Jesus and Mary Chain

The Jesus and Mary Chain singles chronology
"You Trip Me Up" (1985)	"Just Like Honey" (1985)	"April Skies" (1987)

"Just Like Honey" is a song by the Scottish alternative rock band the Jesus and Mary Chain from their 1985 debut album Psychocandy. The track was released as the third and final single from the album through Blanco y Negro Records in September 1985. An important milestone in the development of the alternative rock subgenre of noise pop, the song was written by band members William Reid and Jim Reid. Drummer Bobby Gillespie quotes Hal Blaine's opening drum riff from The Ronettes' "Be My Baby" in the song's intro.

The song has appeared in several films, most notably in the closing scene of Sofia Coppola's Lost in Translation (2003), as well as The Man Who Loved Yngve and a 2011 Volkswagen advertisement. The track is also featured in "Mommy", the third episode of American Horror Story: Hotel.

== Chart performance ==
The single reached number 45 on the UK Singles Chart.

== Critical reception ==
"Just Like Honey" was ranked at number two on the NME "Tracks of the Year" list for 1985, behind only Psychocandy's lead single "Never Understand". In 2015, Pitchfork placed it at number 46 on their list of the 200 best songs of the 1980s, with T. Cole Rachel calling it "a classic bad boy love song—a reverby [sic] dose of Phil Spector grandiosity that sounds as if it might have been recorded in a smoky cave." In a retrospective review of Psychocandy, Ned Raggett of AllMusic praised "Just Like Honey" as "weirdly beautiful" and "anti-pop yet pure pop at the same time".

In 2021, Time Out named it the twentieth-best song about oral sex.

== Track listing ==
All tracks written by Jim Reid and William Reid.

7" (NEG 17)

1. "Just Like Honey" – 3:00
2. "Head" – 3:48

2×7" Gatefold (NEG 17F)

1. "Just Like Honey" – 3:00
2. "Head" – 3:48
3. "Inside Me"– 3:08
4. "Just Like Honey" (Demo) – 2:54

12" (NEG 17T)

1. "Just Like Honey" – 3:00
2. "Head" – 3:48
3. "Cracked" – 3:43
4. "Just Like Honey" (Demo) – 2:54

== Personnel ==
=== The Jesus and Mary Chain ===
- Jim Reid – vocals, producer
- William Reid – guitar, producer
- Douglas Hart – bass guitar, producer
- Bobby Gillespie – drums, producer

=== Additional personnel ===
- Karen Parker – backing vocals
- John Loder – engineering

== Charts ==
Chart (1985)	Peak position
UK Singles (OCC)	45
