= You Trip Me Up =

Single by The Jesus and Mary Chain

from the album Psychocandy
- B-side: "Just Out of Reach"
- Released: May 1985
- Genre: Noise pop
- Label: Blanco y Negro
- Songwriters: William Reid, Jim Reid
- Producers: The Jesus and Mary Chain

The Jesus and Mary Chain singles chronology
"Never Understand" (1985)	"You Trip Me Up" (1985)	"Just Like Honey" (1985)

"You Trip Me Up" is a song by the Scottish alternative rock band The Jesus and Mary Chain from their 1985 debut album Psychocandy. The track was released as the second single from the record through Blanco y Negro Records in May 1985. The song was written by band members William Reid and Jim Reid.

It was one of the first four songs by the band that were recorded for a Peel Session.

A music video for the song was recorded in Algarve, Portugal.

== Critical reception ==
The song was ranked number 6 among the "Tracks of the Year" for 1985 by NME.

== Chart performance ==
The single reached number 55 on the UK Singles Chart.

== Track listing ==
All tracks written by Jim Reid and William Reid.

7" (NEG 13)

1. "You Trip Me Up" – 2:22
2. "Just Out of Reach" – 3:04

12" (NEG 13T)

1. "You Trip Me Up" – 2:22
2. "Just Out of Reach" – 3:04
3. "Boyfriend's Dead" – 1:36

== Personnel ==
=== The Jesus and Mary Chain ===
- Jim Reid – vocals, producer
- William Reid – guitar, producer
- Douglas Hart – bass, producer
- Bobby Gillespie – drums, producer

=== Additional personnel ===
- John Loder – engineer
