= Tom Moon =

American saxophonist, author and music critic (born 1960)

- Born: Thomas Raphael Moon; November 3, 1960 (age 65)
- Education: University of Miami
- Occupations: Saxophonist; author; music critic
- Notable work: 1,000 Recordings to Hear Before You Die (2008)

Thomas Raphael Moon (born November 3, 1960) is an American saxophonist, author and music critic. He is best known for his 2008 book 1,000 Recordings to Hear Before You Die. He has won two Deems Taylor Awards from the American Society of Composers, Authors and Publishers.

== Biography ==
Tom Moon studied music at the University of Miami, and he played in the Maynard Ferguson Orchestra for about a year on tour. In the 1980s, Moon put his career as a musician on hold to focus on music journalism. He began writing about music in 1983.

In 1988, Moon accepted a job at The Philadelphia Inquirer as their music critic, despite the fact that the paper saw his previous experience as a musician as a conflict of interest. As he later told Jazz Times: "Because I didn't know anybody in Philadelphia, [the Inquirer staff] felt that the potential existed for people to hire me to play when they were just trying to get press...Instead of arriving at the crossroads and getting the keys to the kingdom and playing, I had to say that I won’t do this professionally any more." He remained the resident music critic at the Inquirer until 2004.

In 1996, he began contributing to NPR's All Things Considered program. He is a longtime contributor to multiple music magazines, including Rolling Stone, GQ, Blender, and Spin. In 2011, his Moon Hotel Lounge Project released the album Into the Ojalá on Moon's own label, Frosty Cordial Records.
