= NME's The 500 Greatest Albums of All Time =

2013 issue of NME

NME's "500 Greatest Albums of All Time" magazine cover

"The 500 Greatest Albums of All Time" is a 2013 special issue of the British magazine NME. The list presented was compiled based on votes from current and past NME journalists. The number one album was The Queen Is Dead by the Smiths.

== Background ==
Made similarly to the Rolling Stone's 500 Greatest Albums of All Time, the list was voted for by NME journalists past and present, each of whom submitted a weighted list of 50 albums.

== Reception ==
This NME listing was criticised by the media. The Guardian noted that NME's Features Editor in 2013, Laura Snapes, rated in her top four spots four albums by the same band, the National. Snapes included a fifth National album at number 7 in her top ten greatest albums of all time. Another NME journalist, Kevin EG Perry, also selected four albums by the same band in his top four spots, the Rolling Stones. Ben Kaye of Consequence of Sound wrote that "if Laura Snapes had her wish, the top four would all be the National albums". He wrote:

The Smiths' The Queen Is Dead is the greatest album of all time. It's better than anything the Beatles ever did (though Revolver came close). Meanwhile, the band Queen is nowhere on the list at all, whereas Queens of the Stone Age shows up thrice (they also show up Thrice, who don't appear). Some other interesting highlights include Oasis' Definitely Maybe starting the top 10, PJ Harvey's Let England Shake making an impressive No. 15, Arcade Fire's Funeral (13) slotting higher than My Bloody Valentine's Loveless (18), and Outkast's Stankonia only good enough to slip in at 500.

More oddities: The highest ranked Michael Jackson album (Thriller) hits at 131, while LCD Soundsystem broke the top 50 with Sound of Silver (49). It's rad that Jimmy Eat World's Bleed American (429) made it on, but having it one spot below Bruce Springsteen's Born in the U.S.A. and two above Soundgarden's Badmotorfinger seems kinda crazy. Speaking of the Boss, Nebraska (148) isn’t quite as good as Frank Ocean’s Channel Orange (147), but slightly better than Elliott Smith's Either/Or (149) and The Streets Original Pirate Material (150). Also, apparently Arctic Monkeys' one-month-old AM (449) is already better than Big Star's Third (451).

He also pointed out the differences between the list and the Top 100 British Albums Ever, released by NME in 2006. Michael Nelson of Stereogum thought the top three albums were a good choice, but said the rest was "a waking nightmare".

== Statistics ==
Artists with the most albums on the list
Artist	Number of albums	Highest album position
David Bowie	10	3
The Beatles	7	2
Bob Dylan	7	36
Bruce Springsteen	5	85
Elvis Costello	5	256
PJ Harvey	5	15
Radiohead	5	20
The Smiths	5	1
Beck	4	307
Blur	4	22
Nirvana	4	11
R.E.M.	4	65
The Rolling Stones	4	24
Tom Waits	4	105
The Who	4	275
The National	4	162
Neil Young	4	56
Nick Cave and the Bad Seeds	4	165
Arcade Fire	3	13
Beastie Boys	3	32
The Beach Boys	3	26
Björk	3	46
The Clash	3	39
Leonard Cohen	3	232
Daft Punk	3	76
Dexys Midnight Runners	3	118
Jay-Z	3	186
Kanye West	3	21
Kings of Leon	3	212
Kraftwerk	3	57
Manic Street Preachers	3	44
Michael Jackson	3	131
New Order	3	122
Pavement	3	206
Pixies	3	8
Prince	3	91
Public Enemy	3	17
Pulp	3	6
Queens of the Stone Age	3	93
Sonic Youth	3	41
Spiritualized	3	156
Stevie Wonder	3	42
Suede	3	31
Super Furry Animals	3	92
The Velvet Underground	3	5
The Verve	3	128
The White Stripes	3	77
The Strokes	2	4
Arctic Monkeys	2	19
Massive Attack	2	60
Coldplay	2	266
Oasis	2	10
Primal Scream	2	27
Jeff Buckley	1	19
John Lennon	2	133
Weezer	2	108

== See also ==
- Album era
- Rolling Stone's 500 Greatest Albums of All Time, a similar list
- All Time Top 1000 Albums, a similar list
