= Tadao Ando =

Japanese architect (born 1941)

- 安藤 忠雄
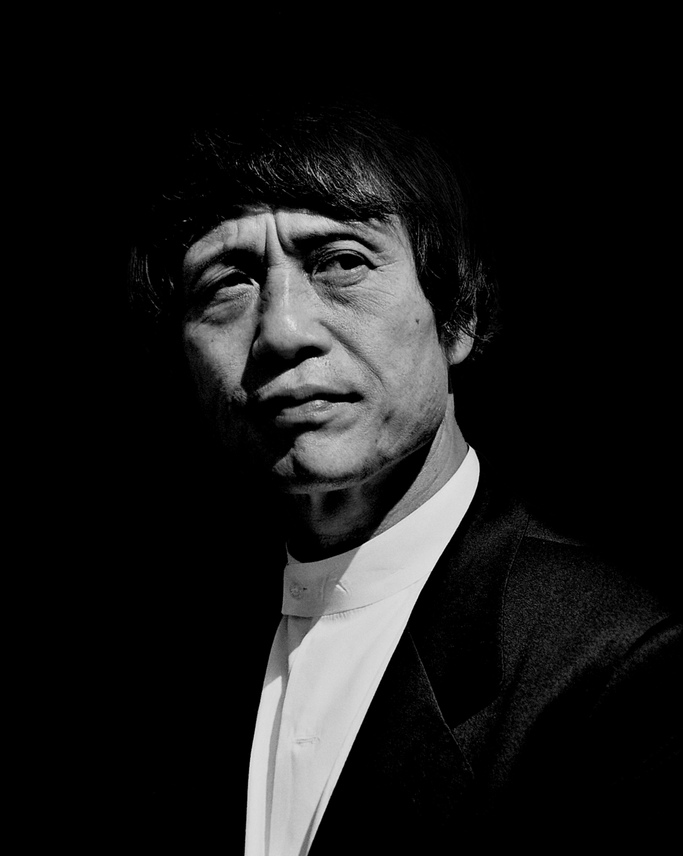
- Ando in 2004
- Born: 13 September 1941 (age 85); Minato-ku, Osaka, Japan
- Education: Jyoto Technology High School
- Occupation: Architect
- Awards: Alvar Aalto Medal, 1985; Carlsberg Architectural Prize, 1992; Pritzker Prize, 1995; RIBA Royal Gold Medal, 1997; AIA Gold Medal, 2002; Neutra Medal for Professional Excellence, 2012
- Practice: Tadao Ando Architects & Associates
- Buildings: Row House, Sumiyoshi, 1979; Church of the Light, Osaka, 1989; Water Temple, Awaji, 1991
- Projects: Rokko Housing I, II, III, Kobe, 1983–1999

Tadao Ando (安藤 忠雄, Andō Tadao; born September 13, 1941) is a Japanese architect. Self-taught, he is known for his unique integration of architecture and landscape. Architectural historian Francesco Dal Co described his work as an example of "critical regionalism". Ando was awarded the Pritzker Prize in 1995.

== Early life ==
Tadao Ando was born in 1941 in Minato-ku, Osaka, Japan, just a few minutes before his twin brother. At the age of two, he was separated from his sibling and raised by his great-grandmother. As a child, Ando would explore construction sites and took inspiration from workers who crafted their buildings to last "for 100 years". He cites his childhood home as an influence on his architectural work, saying that living in a nagaya row house taught him how limited use of light affects interior spaces. When he was 15 years old, Ando participated in renovating the house by helping the construction workers.

Before becoming an architect, Ando worked as a boxer and fighter. He had no formal training in architecture, but a visit to Tokyo during high school, where he saw the Frank Lloyd Wright–designed Imperial Hotel, deeply inspired him. Less than two years after graduating from high school, he left boxing to pursue architecture, studying drawing at night and taking correspondence courses on interior design. He later travelled to study buildings by masters such as Le Corbusier, Ludwig Mies van der Rohe, Frank Lloyd Wright, and Louis Kahn, as well as visiting Greece to study the Pantheon and the Parthenon.

It was very important for me to travel to these buildings...In Japan, when you are studying architecture, you are studying Western architecture. With that in mind, I needed to go to the source...which is Greek and Roman architecture. When I design a building, those images are always with me...I always go back to thinking about those buildings and their affect as a built structure.

In 1968, he returned to Osaka and founded Tadao Ando Architects and Associates.

== Career ==
=== Style ===
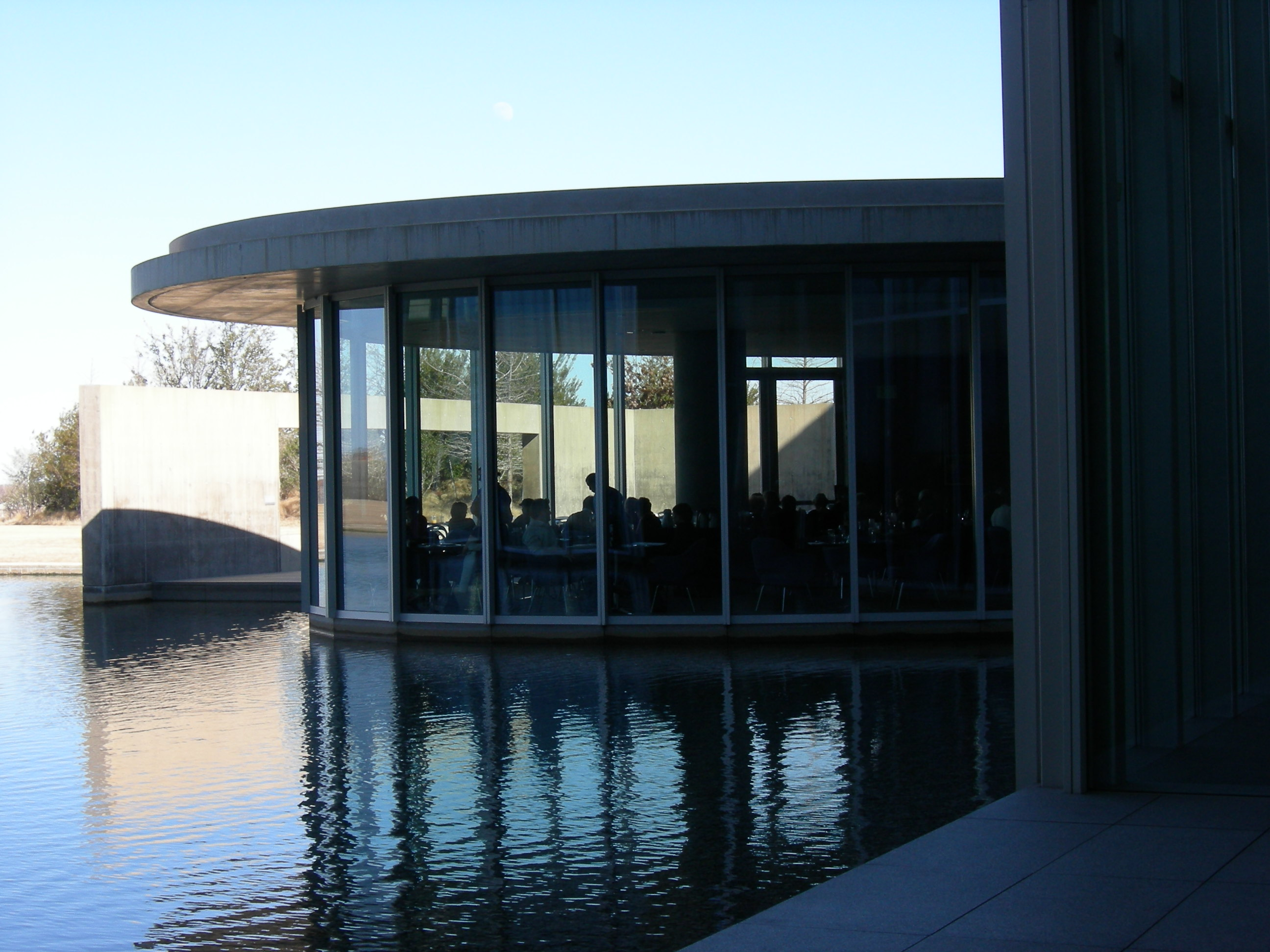
Modern Art Museum of Fort Worth, showing the restaurant

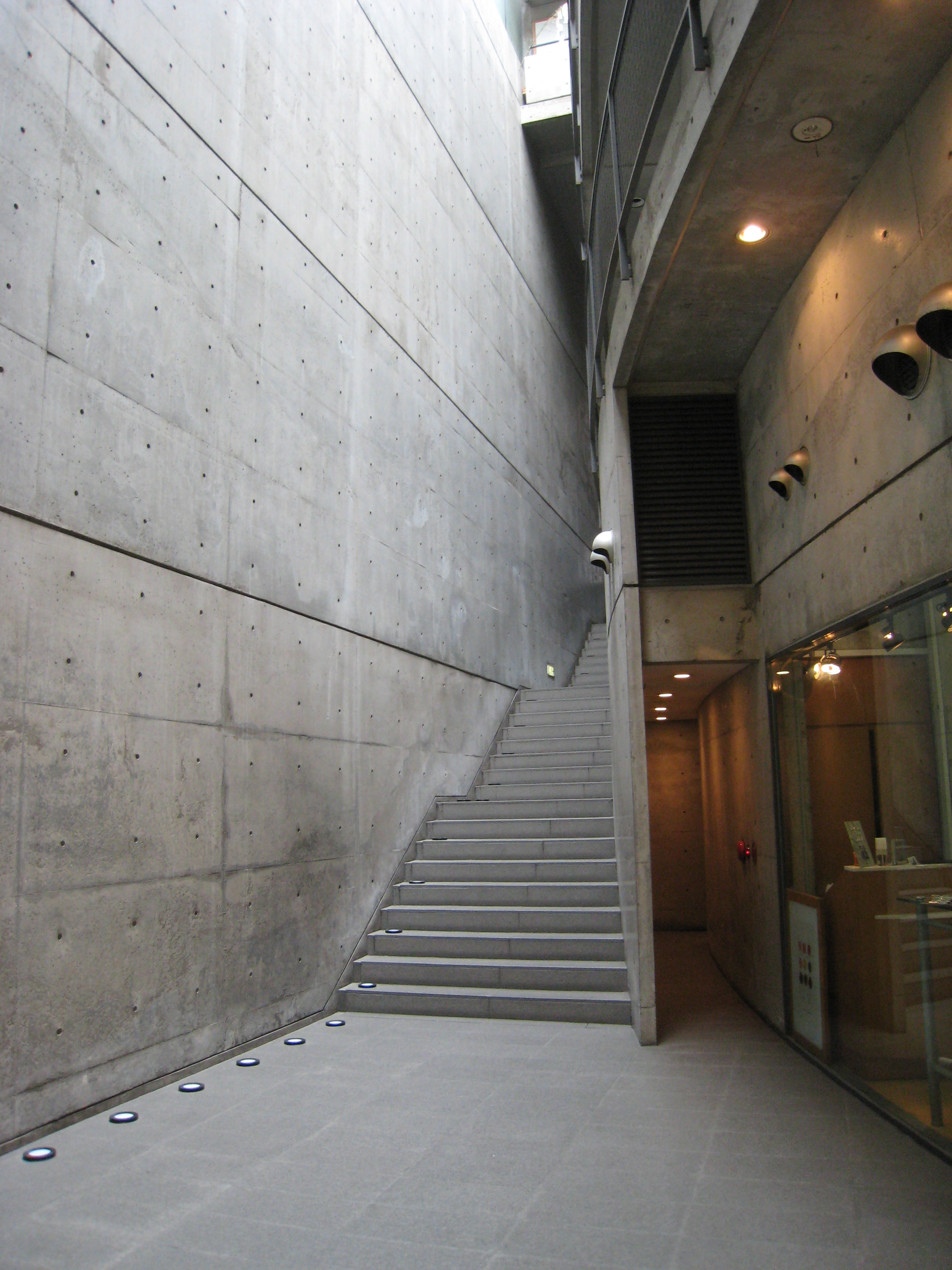
Galleria Akka, Osaka, 1988

Ando was raised in Japan where the religion and style of life strongly influenced his architecture and design. Ando's architectural style is said to create a "haiku" effect, emphasizing nothingness and empty space to represent the beauty of simplicity. He favors designing complex spatial circulation while maintaining the appearance of simplicity.

Architecture has always been about boundaries; building boundaries for protection and then opening them up for movement.

A self-taught architect, he keeps his Japanese culture and language in mind while he travels around Europe for research. As an architect, he believes that architecture can change society, that "to change the dwelling is to change the city and to reform society". "Reform society" could be a promotion of a place or a change of the identity of that place. Werner Blaser has said, "Good buildings by Tadao Ando create memorable identity and therefore publicity, which in turn attracts the public and promotes market penetration".

The simplicity of his architecture emphasizes the concept of sensation and physical experiences, mainly influenced by Japanese culture. The religious term Zen, focuses on the concept of simplicity and concentrates on inner feeling rather than outward appearance. Zen influences vividly show in Ando's work and became its distinguishing mark. In order to practice the idea of simplicity, Ando's architecture is mostly constructed with concrete, providing a sense of cleanliness and weightlessness (even though concrete is a heavy material) at the same time. Due to the simplicity of the exterior, construction, and organization of the space are relatively potential in order to represent the aesthetic of sensation.

Besides Japanese religious architecture, Ando has also designed Christian churches, such as the Church of the Light (1989) and the Church in Tarumi (1993). Although Japanese and Christian churches display distinct characteristics, Ando treats them in a similar way. He believes there should be no difference in designing religious architecture and houses. As he explains,

We do not need to differentiate one from the other. Dwelling in a house is not only a functional issue, but also a spiritual one. The house is the locus of heart (kokoro), and the heart is the locus of god. Dwelling in a house is a search for the heart (kokoro) as the locus of god, just as one goes to church to search for god. An important role of the church is to enhance this sense of the spiritual. In a spiritual place, people find peace in their heart (kokoro), as in their homeland.

Besides speaking of the spirit of architecture, Ando also emphasises the association between nature and architecture. He intends for people to easily experience the spirit and beauty of nature through architecture. He believes architecture is responsible for performing the attitude of the site and makes it visible. This not only represents his theory of the role of architecture in society but also shows why he spends so much time studying architecture from physical experience.

In 1995, Ando won the Pritzker Prize for architecture, considered the highest distinction in the field. He donated the $100,000 prize money to the orphans of the 1995 Kobe earthquake.

=== Buildings and works ===
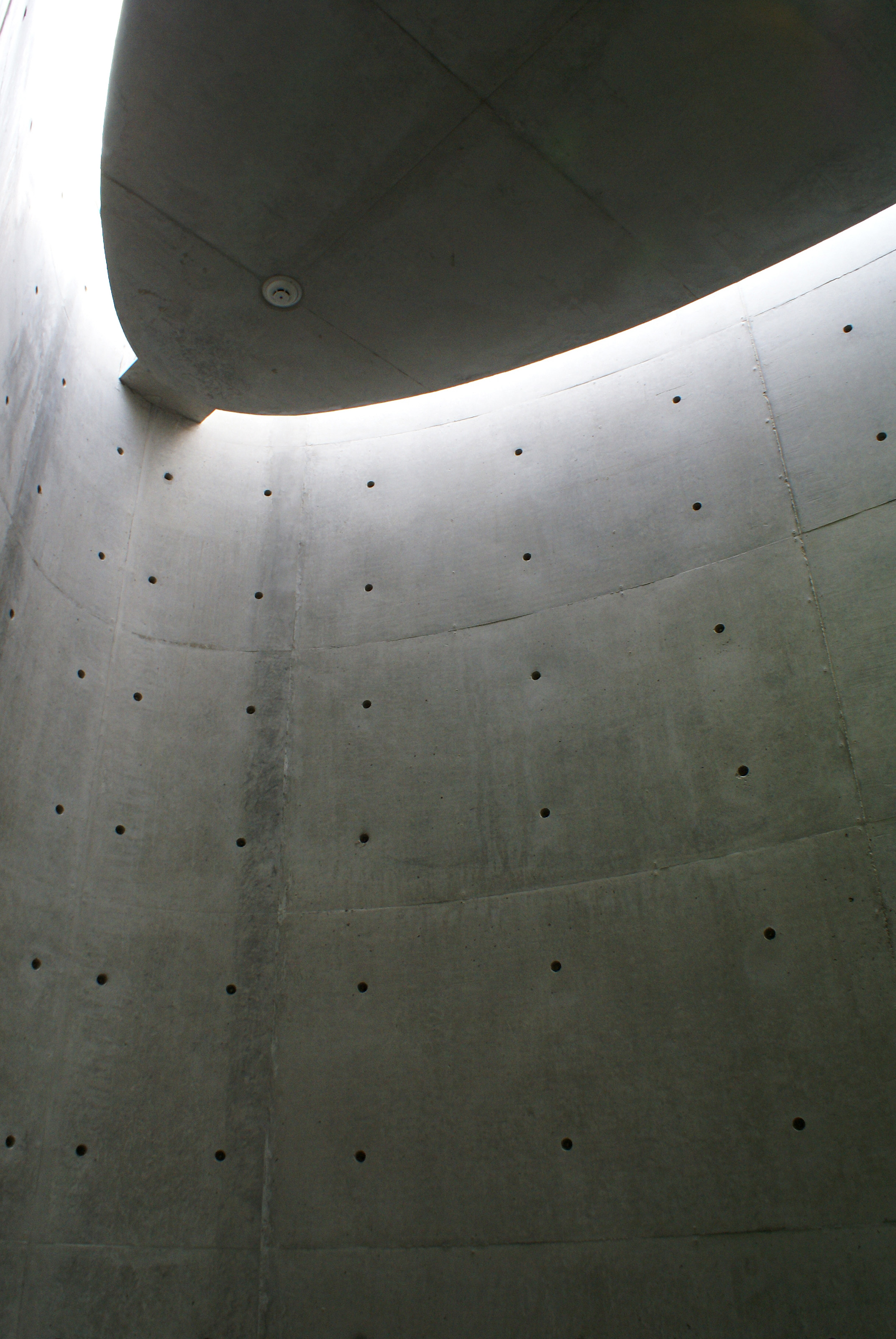
Hyogo Prefectural Museum of Art, Kobe

Tadao Ando's body of work is known for the creative use of natural light and for structures that follow natural forms of the landscape, rather than disturbing the landscape by making it conform to the constructed space of a building. Ando's buildings are often characterized by complex three-dimensional circulation paths. These paths weave in between interior and exterior spaces formed both inside large-scale geometric shapes and in the spaces between them.

His Row House in Sumiyoshi (Azuma House, 住吉の長屋), a small two-story, cast-in-place concrete house completed in 1976, is an early work which began to show elements of his characteristic style. It consists of three equal rectangular volumes: two enclosed volumes of interior spaces separated by an open courtyard. The open courtyard provides natural light, air, and exposure to the weather, while also connecting the living spaces on either side. On the second floor, a bridge connects the bedrooms across the courtyard. The house is famous for the contrast between appearance and spatial organization that allows people to experience the richness of the space within the geometry.

Ando's housing complex at Rokko, just outside Kobe, is a complex warren of terraces and balconies, atriums and shafts. The designs for Rokko Housing One (1983) and for Rokko Housing Two (1993) illustrate a range of issues in traditional architectural vocabulary—the interplay of solid and void, the alternatives of open and closed, the contrasts of light and darkness. More significantly, Ando's noteworthy engineering achievement in these clustered buildings is site-specific—the structures survived undamaged after the Great Hanshin earthquake of 1995. New York Times architectural critic Paul Goldberger argues that:

Ando is right in the Japanese tradition: spareness has always been a part of Japanese architecture, at least since the 16th century; [and] it is not without reason that Frank Lloyd Wright more freely admitted to the influences of Japanese architecture than of anything American."

Like Wright's Imperial Hotel in Tokyo Second Imperial Hotel 1923–1968, which did survive the Great Kantō earthquake of 1923, site specific decision-making, anticipates seismic activity in several of Ando's Hyōgo-Awaji buildings.

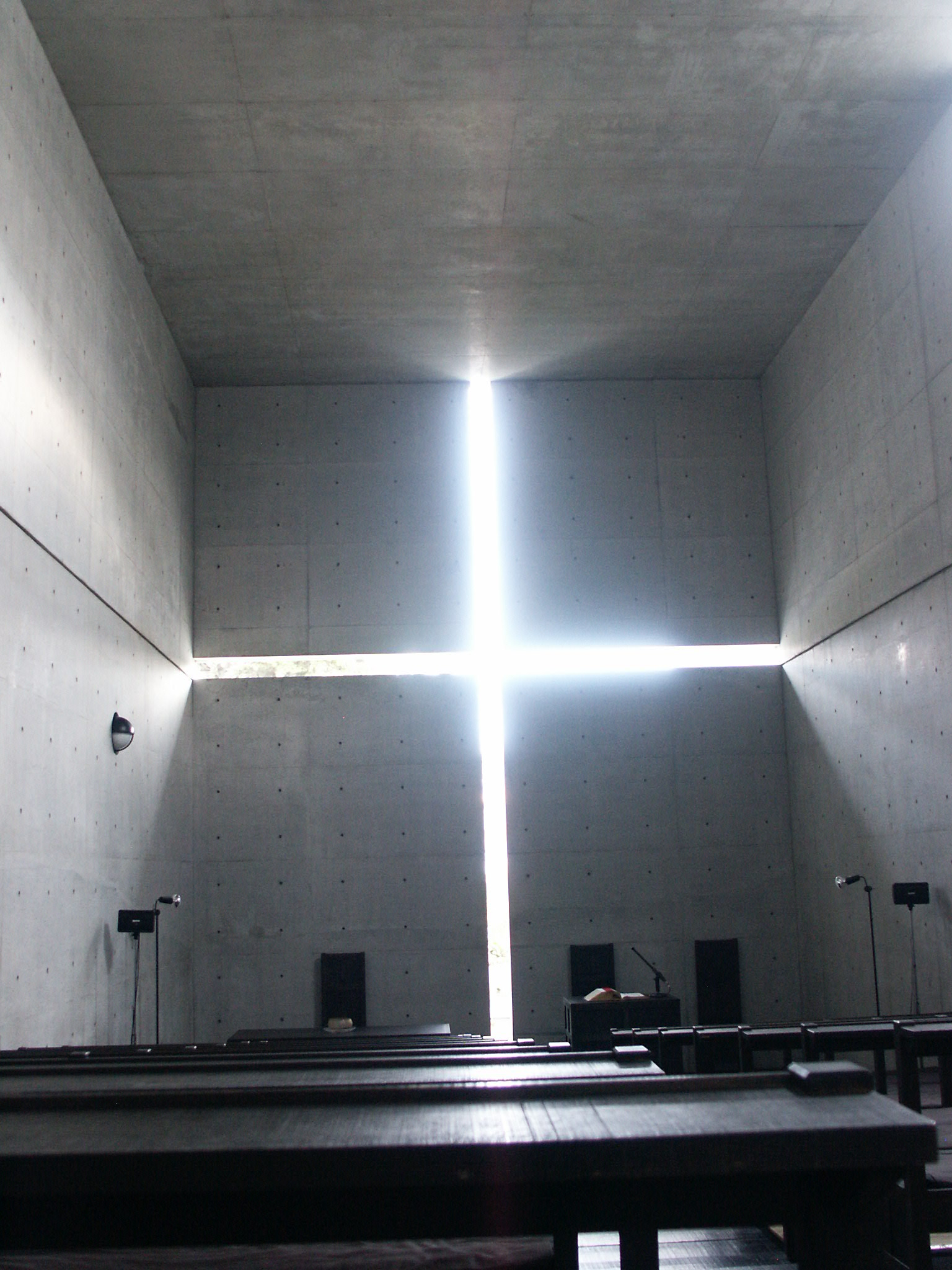
The Church of the Light in Ibaraki, Osaka

Unlike the architect Auguste Perret, who pioneered the use of reinforced concrete, Ando used shuttering formwork to give concrete building elements their shape. The finished Ando building bears the memory of wood texture. The smoothness of the concrete is achieved by the careful preparation of the casting moulds. Ando buildings are credited with the interior design use of exposed concrete. The use of prominent beams is perceived to be rooted in Japanese architectural history. The Rokko apartments and the Church of the Light earned Ando international recognition, and he was noted by those who detect a regional quality in concrete construction.

In 2003, Ando was commissioned by soap opera heir William Bell, Jr. and his wife Maria to design a house for an almost 6-acre (2.4 ha) oceanfront site on the East Pacific Coast Highway in the Paradise Cove area of Malibu, California. The house (designed with WHY Architects) is a 40,000-square-foot (3,700 m^{2}) modernist concrete structure in an L shape, with six bedrooms and walls of glass. It has been described as minimalist and "echoey". Construction was completed in 2014, being prolonged due to the oceanfront location, soft soil, and California's extensive building codes. 7,645 cubic yards of unusually high quality concrete were used in the construction of the house, with its rebar specially treated to resist corrosion. The installation of the concrete in the driveway, garage, and parking areas in 2015 won an award for precision from the American Concrete Institute. Ando also designed a series of furniture pieces for the interior. In May 2023, couple Beyoncé and Jay-Z purchased the house through a trust for $200 million. It was the most expensive single-family home sold in the United States in 2023. and surpassed California's previous record price for a residence, set by businessman Marc Andreessen in 2021 for the adjacent house.

== Projects ==
Building/project	Location	Country	Date
Tomishima House	Osaka	Japan	1973
Uchida House		Japan	1974
Uno House	Kyoto	Japan	1974
Hiraoka House	Hyōgo Prefecture	Japan	1974
Shibata House	Ashiya, Hyogo Prefecture	Japan	1974
Tatsumi House	Osaka	Japan	1975
Soseikan-Yamaguchi House	Hyōgo Prefecture	Japan	1975
Takahashi House	Ashiya, Hyōgo Prefecture	Japan	1975
Matsumura House	Kobe	Japan	1975
Row House in Sumiyoshi (Azuma House)	Sumiyoshi, Osaka	Japan	1976
Hirabayashi House	Osaka Prefecture	Japan	1976
Bansho House	Aichi Prefecture	Japan	1976
Tezukayama Tower Plaza	Sumiyoshi, Osaka	Japan	1976
Tezukayama House-Manabe House	Osaka	Japan	1977
Wall House (Matsumoto House)	Ashiya, Hyōgo Prefecture	Japan	1977
Glass Block House (Ishihara House)	Osaka	Japan	1978
Okusu House	Setagaya, Tokyo	Japan	1978
Glass Block Wall (Horiuchi House)	Sumiyoshi, Osaka	Japan	1979
Katayama Building	Nishinomiya, Hyōgo Prefecture	Japan	1979
Onishi House	Sumiyoshi, Osaka	Japan	1979
Matsutani House	Kyoto	Japan	1979
Ueda House	Okayama Prefecture	Japan	1979
Step	Takamatsu, Kagawa	Japan	1980
Matsumoto House	Wakayama, Wakayama Prefecture	Japan	1980
Fuku House	Wakayama, Wakayama Prefecture	Japan	1980
Bansho House Addition	Aichi Prefecture	Japan	1981
Koshino House	Ashiya, Hyōgo Prefecture	Japan	1981
Kojima Housing (Sato House)	Okayama Prefecture	Japan	1981
Atelier in Oyodo	Osaka	Japan	1981
Tea House for Soseikan-Yamaguchi House	Hyōgo Prefecture	Japan	1982
Ishii House	Shizuoka Prefecture	Japan	1982
Akabane House	Setagaya, Tokyo	Japan	1982
Kujo Townhouse (Izutsu House)	Osaka	Japan	1982
Rokko Housing One (34.725613°N 135.227564°E)	Rokko, Hyōgo Prefecture	Japan	1983
Bigi Atelier	Shibuya, Tokyo	Japan	1983
Umemiya House	Kobe	Japan	1983
Kaneko House	Shibuya, Tokyo	Japan	1983
Festival	Naha, Okinawa prefecture	Japan	1984
Time's	Kyoto	Japan	1984
Koshino House Addition	Ashiya, Hyōgo Prefecture	Japan	1984
Melrose, Meguro	Tokyo	Japan	1984
Uejo House	Osaka Prefecture	Japan	1984
Ota House	Okayama Prefecture	Japan	1984
Moteki House	Kobe	Japan	1984
Shinsaibashi Tokyu Building	Osaka Prefecture	Japan	1984
Iwasa House	Ashiya, Hyōgo Prefecture	Japan	1984
Hata House (34.76805°N 135.32397°E)	Nishinomiya, Hyōgo Prefecture	Japan	1984
Atelier Yoshie Inaba	Shibuya, Tokyo	Japan	1985
Jun Port Island Building	Kobe	Japan	1985
Mon-petit-chou	Kyoto	Japan	1985
Guest House for Hattori House	Osaka	Japan	1985
Taiyō Cement Headquarters Building	Osaka	Japan	1986
TS Building	Osaka	Japan	1986
Chapel on Mount Rokko	Kobe	Japan	1986
Old/New Rokkov	Kobe	Japan	1986
Kidosaki House	Setagaya, Tokyo	Japan	1986
Fukuhara Clinic	Setagaya, Tokyo	Japan	1986
Sasaki House	Minato, Tokyo	Japan	1986
Main Pavilion for Tennoji Fair	Osaka	Japan	1987
Karaza Theater	Tokyo	Japan	1987
Ueda House Addition	Okayama Prefecture	Japan	1987
Church on the Water	Tomamu, Hokkaido	Japan	1988
Galleria Akka	Osaka	Japan	1988
Children's Museum	Himeji, Hyōgo	Japan	1989
Church of the Light (34.818763°N 135.37201°E)	Ibaraki Osaka Prefecture	Japan	1989
Collezione	Minato, Tokyo	Japan	1989
Morozoff P&P Studio	Kobe	Japan	1989
Raika Headquarters	Osaka	Japan	1989
Natsukawa Memorial Hall	Hikone, Shiga	Japan	1989
Yao Clinic, Neyagawa	Osaka Prefecture	Japan	1989
Matsutani House Addition	Kyoto	Japan	1990
Ito House, Setagaya	Tokyo	Japan	1990
Iwasa House Addition	Ashiya, Hyōgo Prefecture	Japan	1990
Garden of Fine Arts	Osaka	Japan	1990
S Building	Osaka	Japan	1990
Water Temple (34.546406°N 134.98813°E)	Awaji Island, Hyōgo Prefecture	Japan	1991
Atelier in Oyodo II	Osaka	Japan	1991
Time's II	Kyoto	Japan	1991
Museum of Literature	Himeji, Hyōgo	Japan	1991
Sayoh Housing	Hyōgo Prefecture	Japan	1991
Minolta Seminar House	Kobe	Japan	1991
Benesse House	Naoshima, Kagawa	Japan	1992
Japanese Pavilion for Expo 92	Seville	Spain	1992
Otemae Art Center	Nishinomiya, Hyōgo Prefecture	Japan	1992
Forest of Tombs Museum	Kumamoto Prefecture	Japan	1992
Rokko Housing Two	Rokko, Kobe	Japan	1993
Vitra Seminar House	Weil am Rhein	Germany	1993
Gallery Noda	Kobe	Japan	1993
YKK Seminar House	Chiba Prefecture	Japan	1993
Suntory Museum	Osaka	Japan	1994
Maxray Headquarters Building	Osaka	Japan	1994
Chikatsu Asuka Museum	Osaka Prefecture	Japan	1994
Kiyo Bank, Sakai Building	Sakai, Osaka	Japan	1994
Garden of Fine Art	Kyoto	Japan	1994
Museum of wood culture	Kami, Hyōgo Prefecture	Japan	1994
Inamori Auditorium	Kagoshima	Japan	1994
Nariwa Museum	Okayama Prefecture	Japan	1994
Naoshima Contemporary Art Museum	Naoshima, Kagawa	Japan	1995
Atelier in Oyodo Annex	Osaka	Japan	1995
Nagaragawa Convention Center	Gifu	Japan	1995
Naoshima Contemporary Art Museum Annex	Naoshima, Kagawa Prefecture	Japan	1995
Meditation Space, UNESCO	Paris	France	1995
Asahi Beer Oyamazaki Villa Museum of Art	Kyoto Prefecture	Japan	1995
Shanghai Pusan Ferry Terminal	Osaka	Japan	1996
Museum of Literature II, Himeji	Hyōgo Prefecture	Japan	1996
Gallery Chiisaime (Sawada House)	Nishinomiya, Hyōgo Prefecture	Japan	1996
Museum of Gojo Culture & Annex	Gojo, Nara Prefecture	Japan	1997
Toto Seminar House	Hyōgo Prefecture	Japan	1997
Yokogurayama Natural Forest Museum	Kōchi Prefecture	Japan	1997
Harima Kogen Higashi Primary School & Junior High School	Hyōgo Prefecture	Japan	1997
Koumi Kogen Museum	Nagano Prefecture	Japan	1997
Eychaner/Lee House	Chicago, Illinois	United States	1997
Daikoku Denki Headquarters Building	Aichi Prefecture	Japan	1998
Daylight Museum	Shiga Prefecture	Japan	1998
Junichi Watanabe Memorial Hall	Sapporo	Japan	1998
Asahi Shimbun Okayama Bureau	Okayama	Japan	1998
Siddhartha Children and Women Hospital	Butwal	Nepal	1998
Church of the Light Sunday School	Ibaraki, Osaka Prefecture	Japan	1999
Rokko Housing III'	Kobe	Japan	1999
Shell Museum, Nishinomiya	Hyōgo Prefecture	Japan	1999
Fabrica (Benetton Communication Research Center)	Villorba	Italy	2000
Awaji-Yumebutai (34.560983°N 135.008144°E)	Hyōgo Prefecture	Japan	2000
Rockfield Shizuoka Factory	Shizuoka	Japan	2000
Pulitzer Arts Foundation	St. Louis, Missouri	United States	2001
Komyo-ji (shrine)	Saijō, Ehime	Japan	2001
Ryotaro Shiba Memorial Museum	Higashiosaka, Osaka prefecture	Japan	2001
Osaka Prefectural Sayamaike Museum	Ōsakasayama, Osaka	Japan	2001
Teatro Armani-Armani World Headquarters	Milan	Italy	2001
Hyōgo Prefectural Museum of Art	Kobe, Hyōgo Prefecture	Japan	2002
Modern Art Museum of Fort Worth	Fort Worth, Texas	United States	2002
Piccadilly Gardens	Manchester	United Kingdom	2002; part-demolished 2020.
4x4 house	Kobe	Japan	2003
Invisible House	Ponzano Veneto	Italy	2004
Chichu Art Museum	Naoshima, Kagawa	Japan	2004
Langen Foundation	Neuss	Germany	2004
Gunma Insect World Insect Observation Hall	Kiryū, Gunma	Japan	2005
Picture Book Museum	Iwaki, Fukushima Prefecture	Japan	2005
Saka no Ue no Kumo Museum	Matsuyama, Ehime	Japan	2006
Morimoto (restaurant)	Chelsea Market, Manhattan	United States	2005
Sakura Garden	Osaka	Japan	2006
Omotesando Hills, Jingumae 4-Chome	Tokyo	Japan	2006
House in Shiga	Ōtsu, Shiga	Japan	2006
21 21 Design Sight	Minato, Tokyo	Japan	2007
Stone Hill Center expansion for the Clark Art Institute	Williamstown, Massachusetts	United States	2008
Glass House	Seopjikoji	South Korea	2008
Genius Loci	Seopjikoji	South Korea	2008
Punta della Dogana (restoration)	Venice	Italy	2009
House, stable, and mausoleum for fashion designer and film director Tom Ford's Cerro Pelon Ranch	near Santa Fe, New Mexico	United States	2009
Rebuilding the Kobe Kaisei Hospital	Nada Ward, Kobe	Japan	2009
Gate of Creation, Universidad de Monterrey	Monterrey	Mexico	2009
NIWAKA Building	Kyoto	Japan	2009
Capella Niseko Resort and Residences	Niseko, Abuta District, Shiribeshi, Hokkaido Prefecture	Japan	2010
Interior design of Miklós Ybl Villa	Budapest	Hungary	2010
Kaminoge Station, Tokyu Corporation	Tokyo	Japan	2011
Centro Roberto Garza Sada of Art Architecture and Design	Monterrey	Mexico	2012
Akita Museum of Art	Akita, Akita	Japan	2012
Bonte Museum	Seogwipo, Jeju	South Korea	2012
Ando Museum	Naoshima, Kagawa	Japan	2013
Asia Museum of Modern Art	Wufeng, Taichung	Taiwan	2013
Hansol Museum (Museum SAN)	Wonju	South Korea	2013
Aurora Museum	Shanghai	China	2013
Richard Sachs Residence	Malibu	United States	2013, partly demolished in 2022/23
Visitor, Exhibition and Conference Center, Clark Art Institute	Williamstown, Massachusetts	United States	2014
Casa Wabi	Puerto Escondido, Oax	Mexico	2014
William J. (Bill) and Maria Bell Residence (with WHY Architects)	Malibu	United States	2014
JCC (Jaeneung Culture Center)	Seoul	South Korea	2015
Hill of the Buddha	Sapporo	Japan	2015
Setouchi Aonagi	Matsuyama, Ehime	Japan	2015
Pearl Art Museum	Shanghai	China	2017
Yumin Art Nouveau Collection	Seogwipo, Jeju	South Korea	2017
152 Elizabeth Street Condominiums	New York, New York	United States	2018
Wrightwood 659	Chicago	United States	2018
Nakanoshima Children's Book Forest	Osaka	Japan	2020
LG Arts Center SEOUL	Seoul	South Korea	2022
Valley Gallery	Naoshima	Japan	2022
Realm of the Light	New Taipei City	Taiwan	2023
MPavilion	Melbourne, Australia	Australia	2023
Dubai Museum of Art (DUMA)	Dubai	United Arab Emirates	

Works and details of different works by Tadao Ando

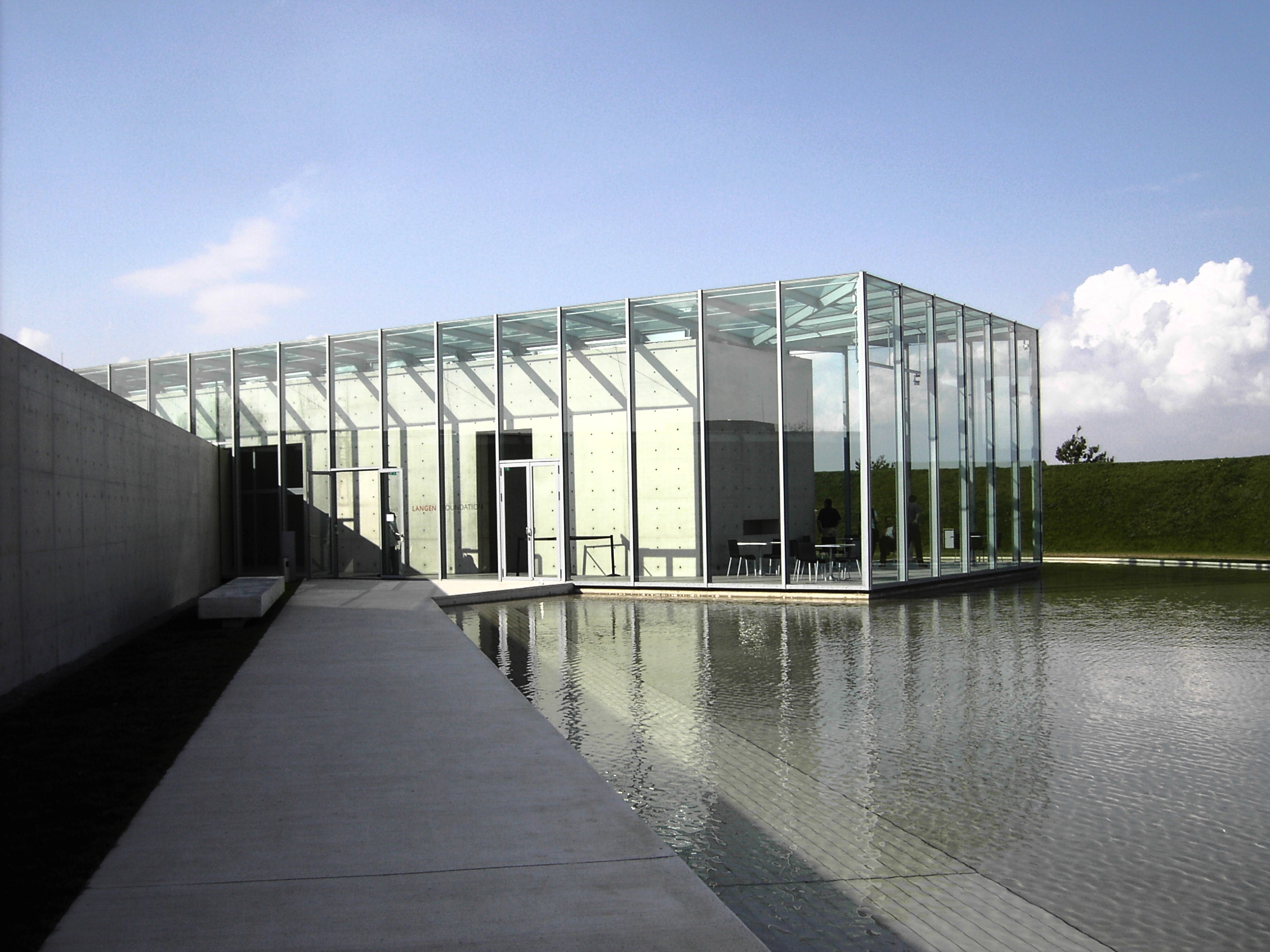
Langen Foundation

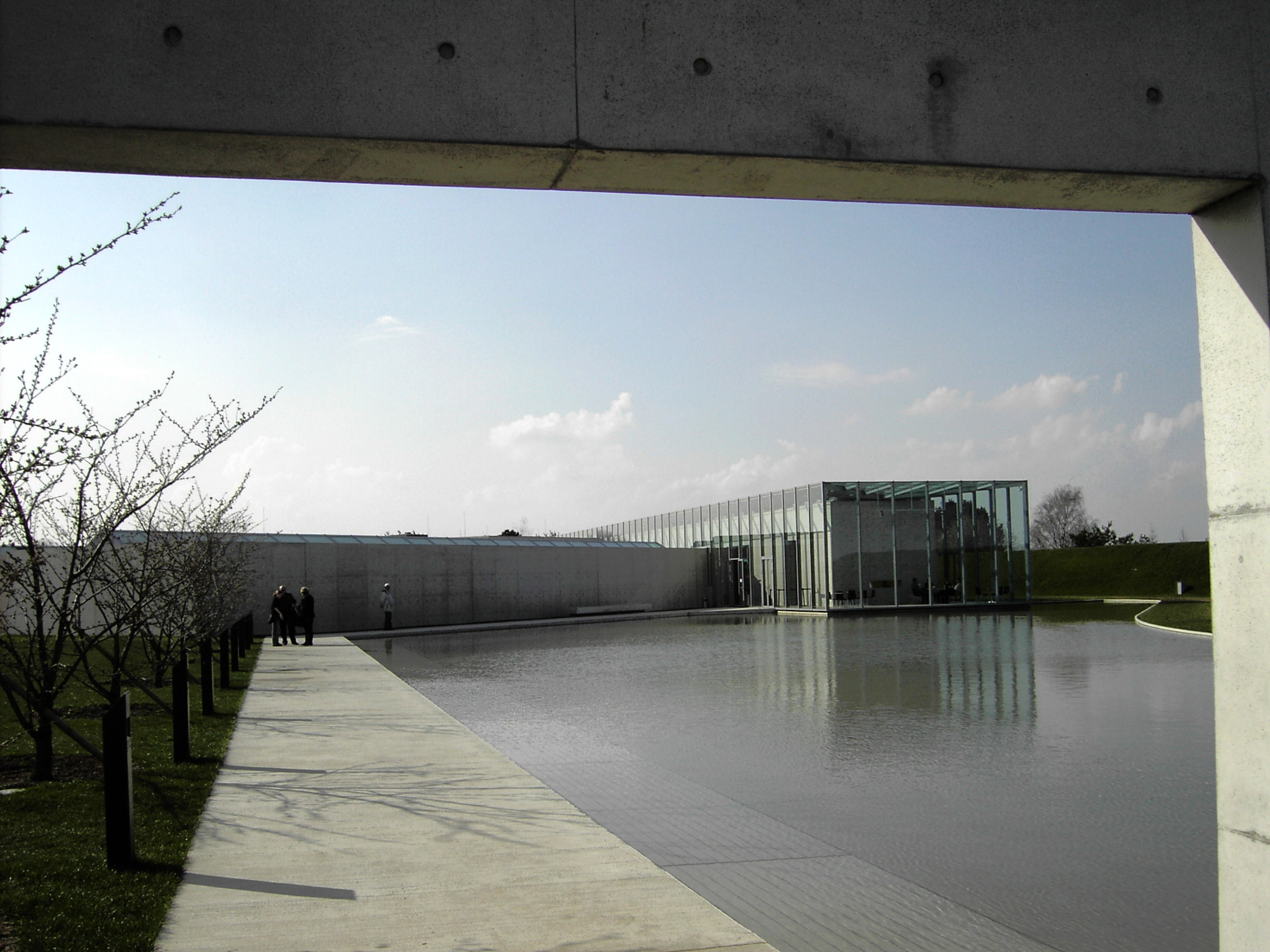
Langen Foundation

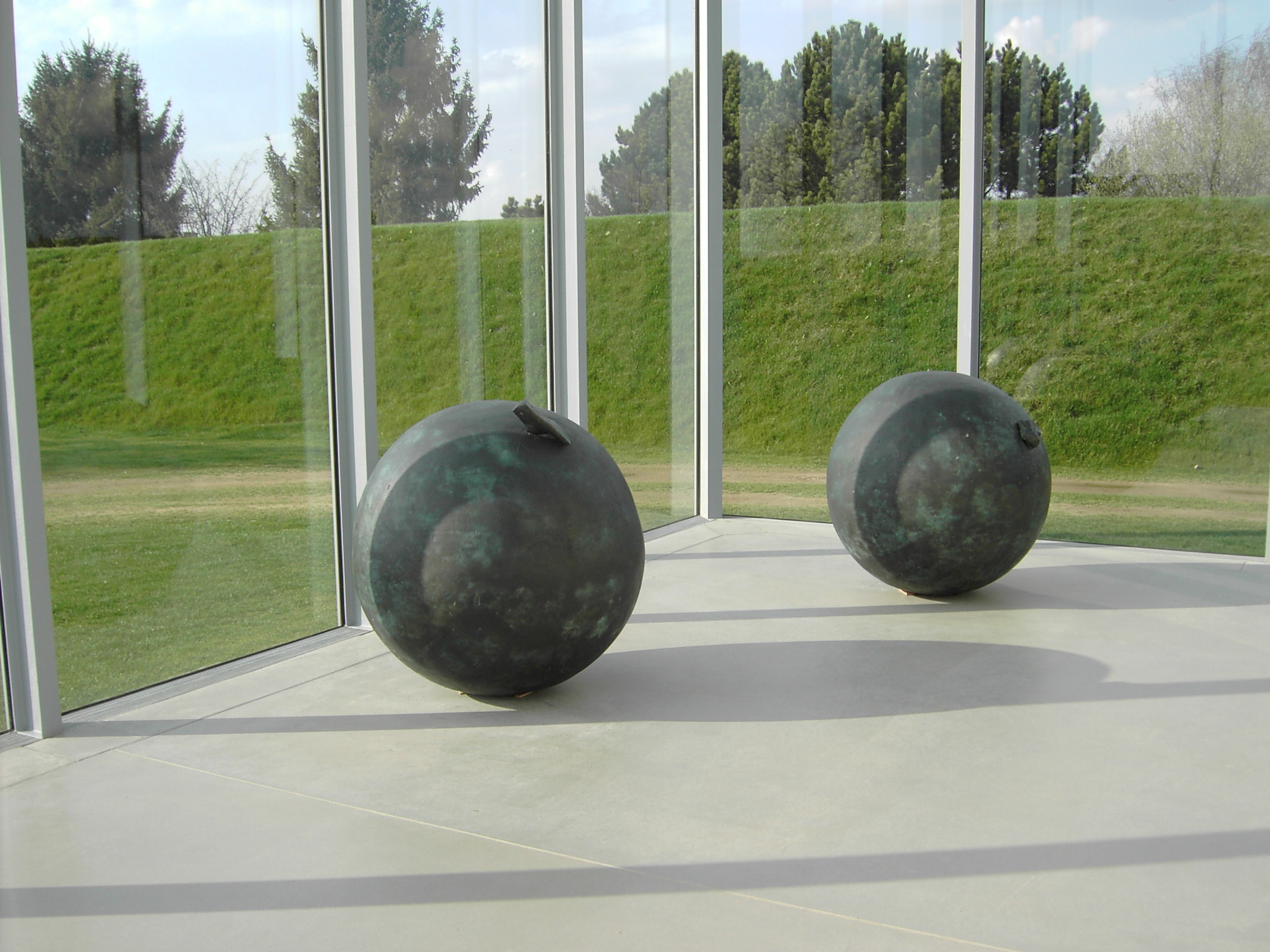
Langen Foundation

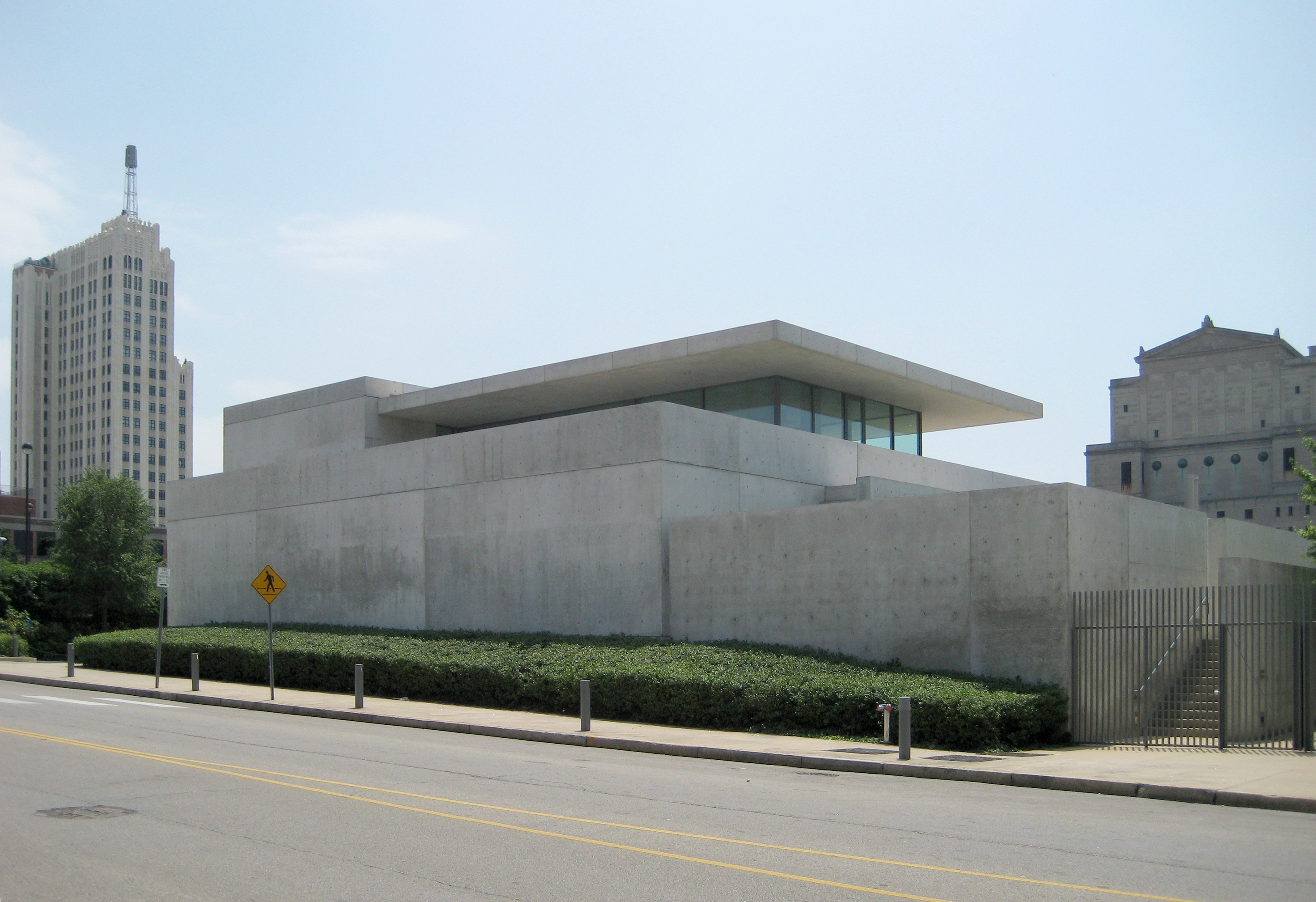
Pulitzer Arts Foundation

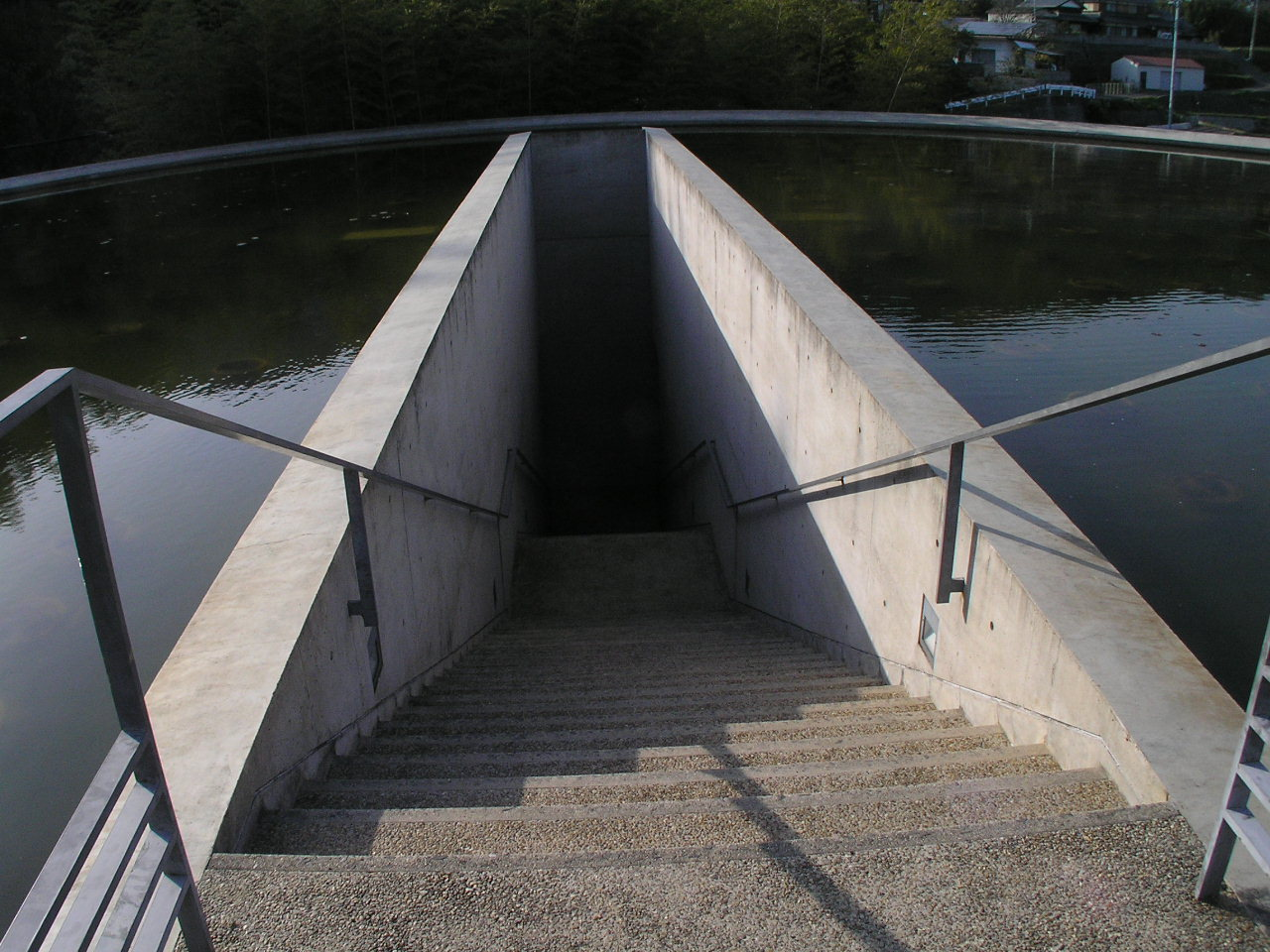
Honpuku Temple (Water Temple)

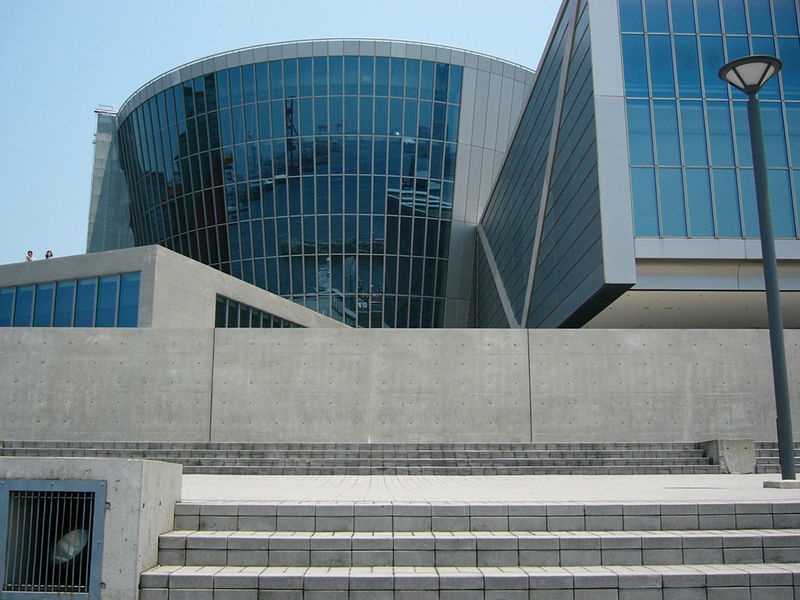
Suntory Museum in Osaka

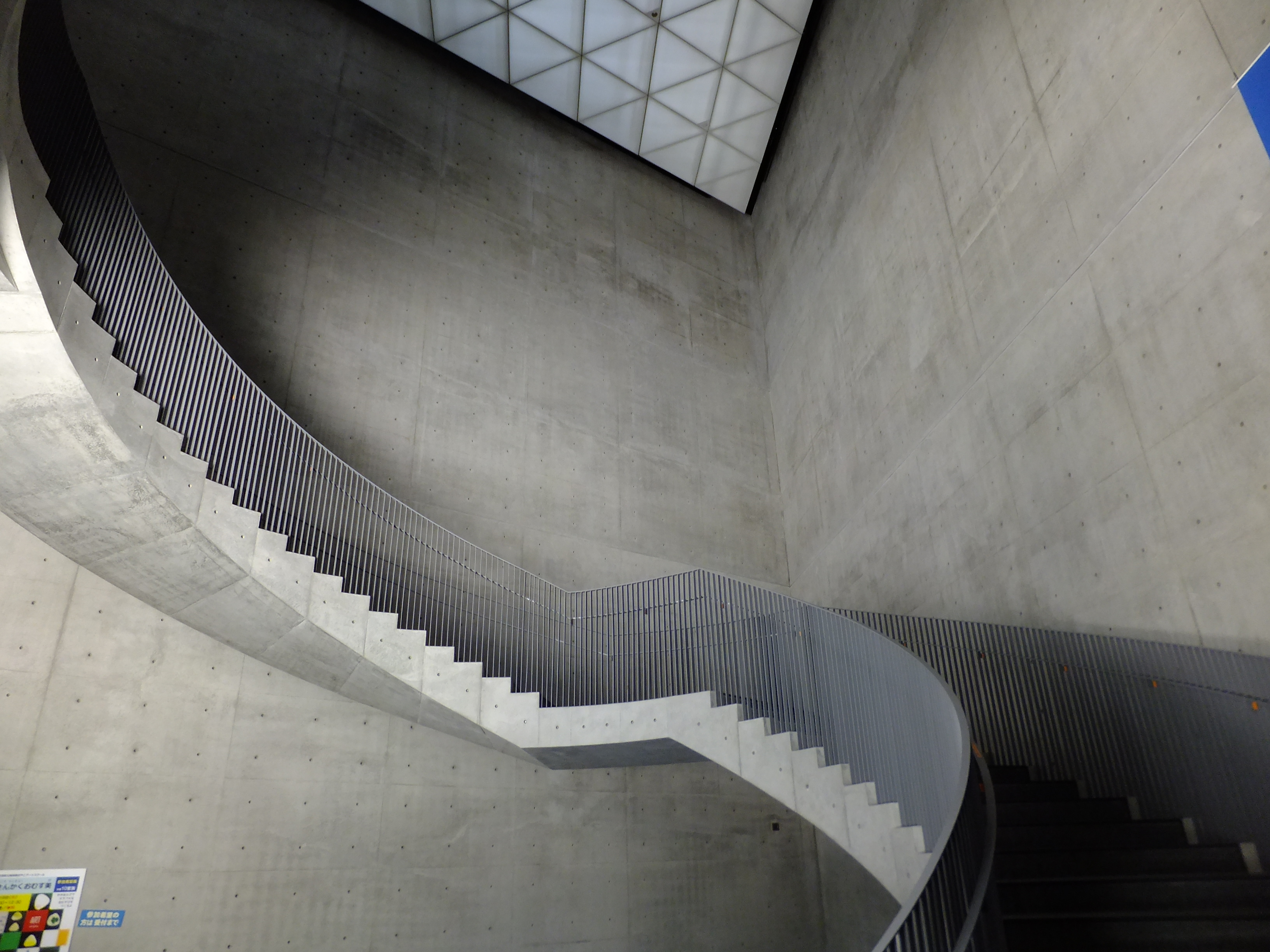
Akita Museum of Art, stairs

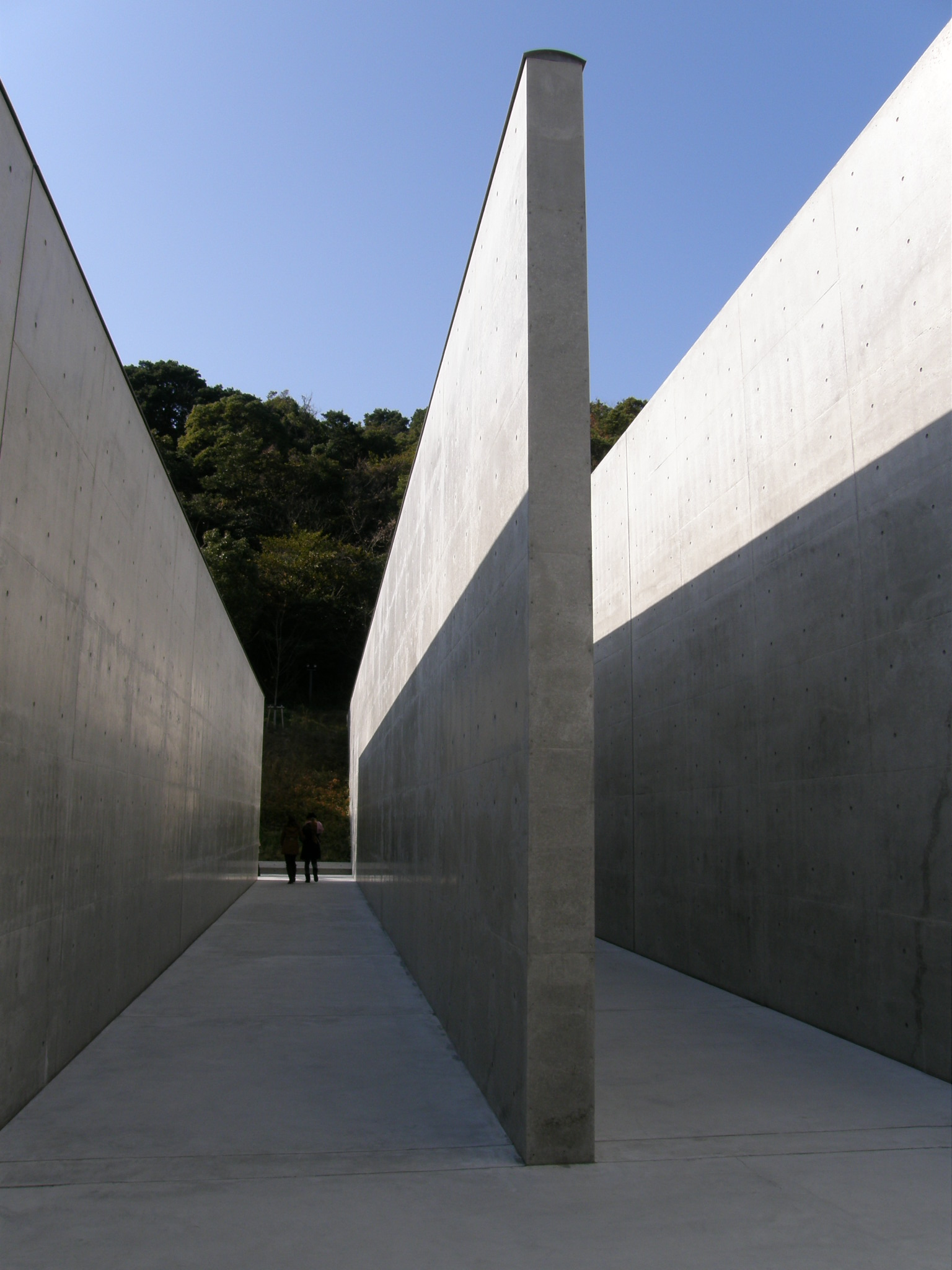
Lee Ufan Museum

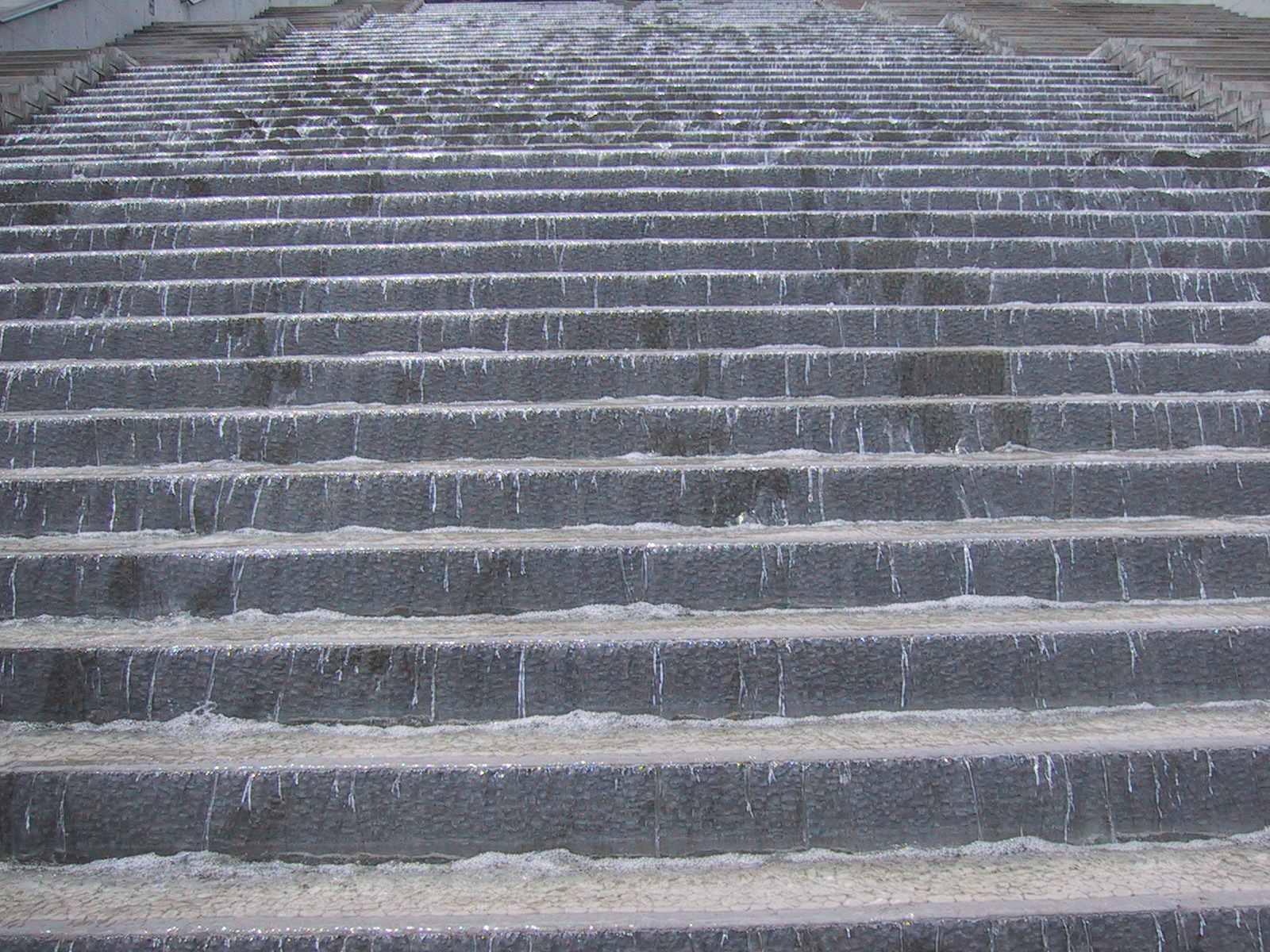
Westin Awaji Island Hotel

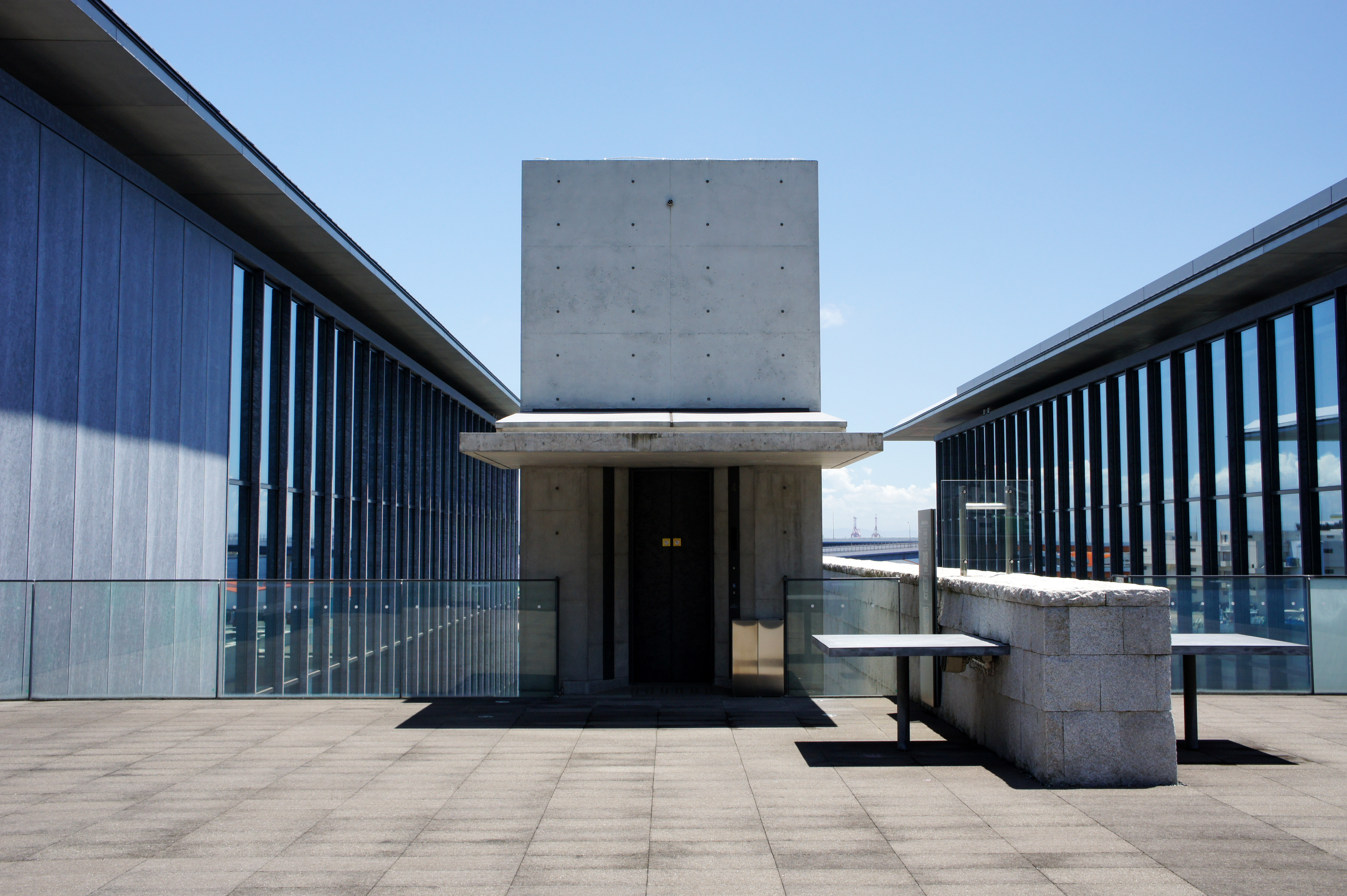
Hyogo prefectural museum of art

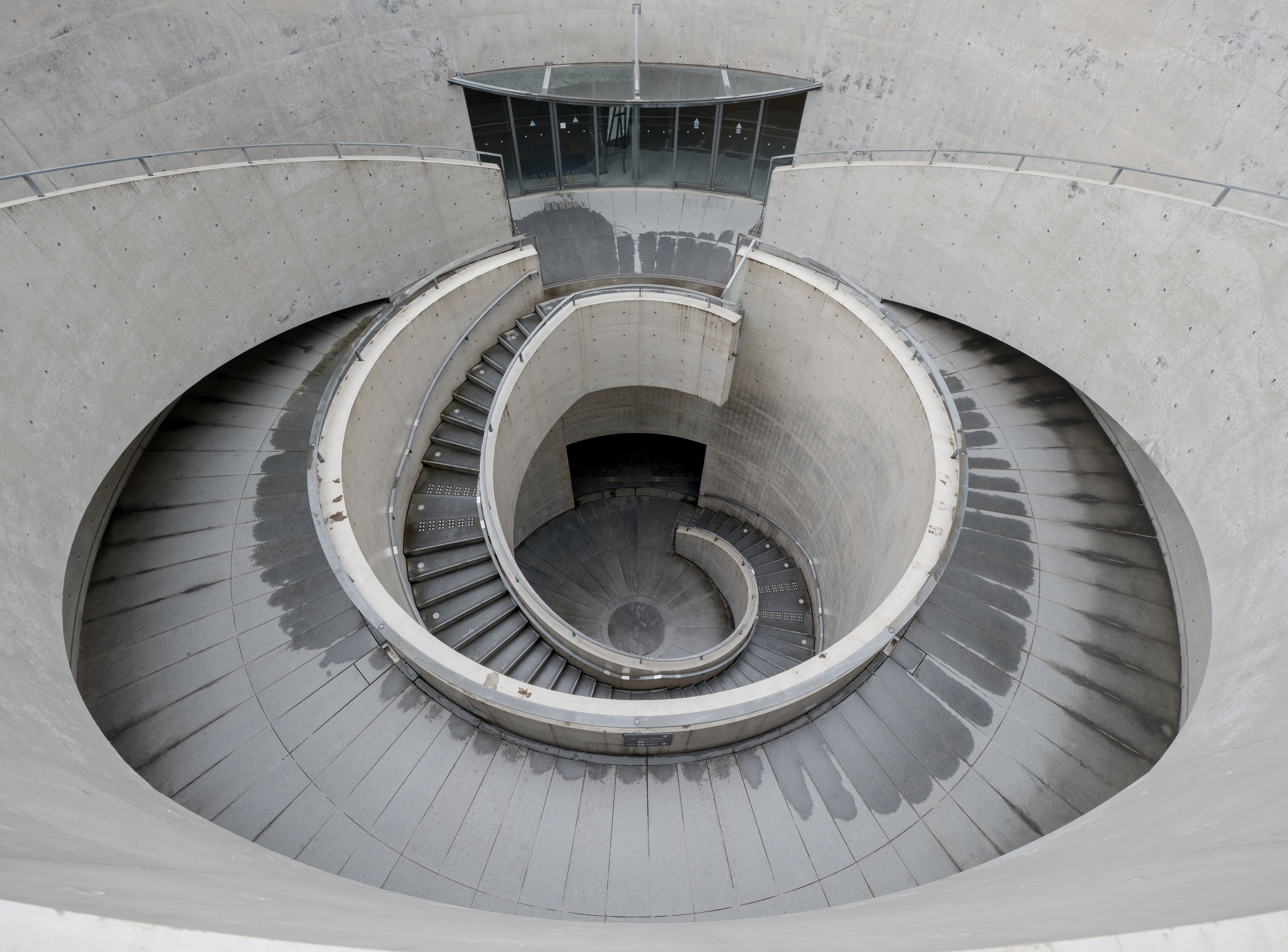
Hyogo prefectural museum of art

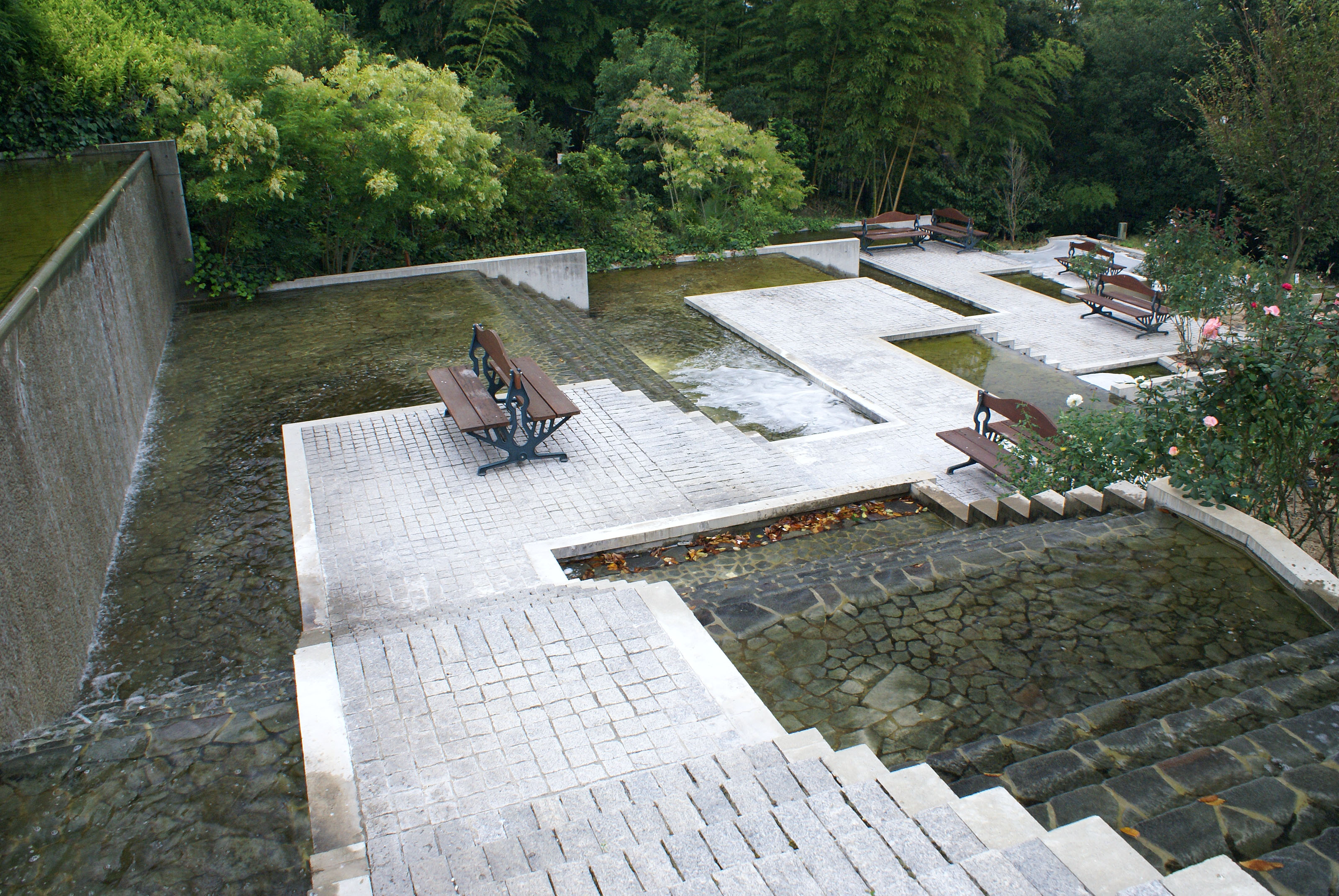
The Shikokumura gallery

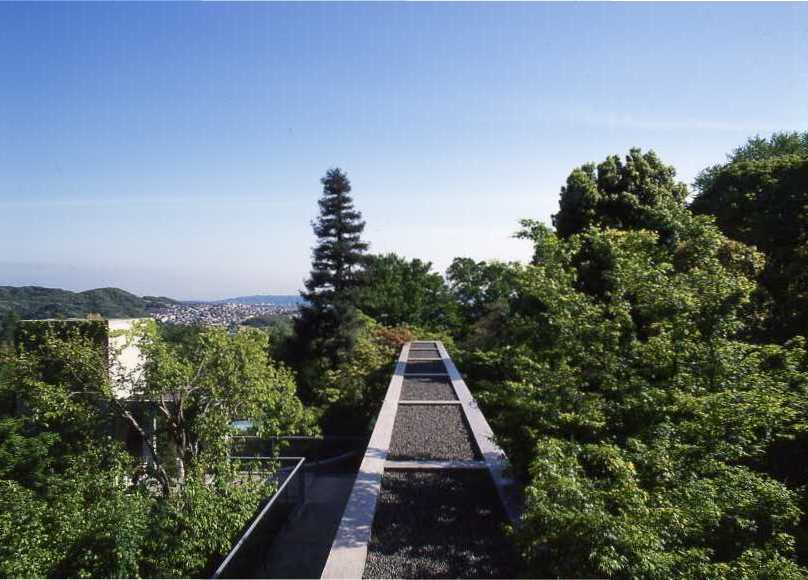
Asahi Beer Oyamazaki Villa Museum of Art, Kyoto

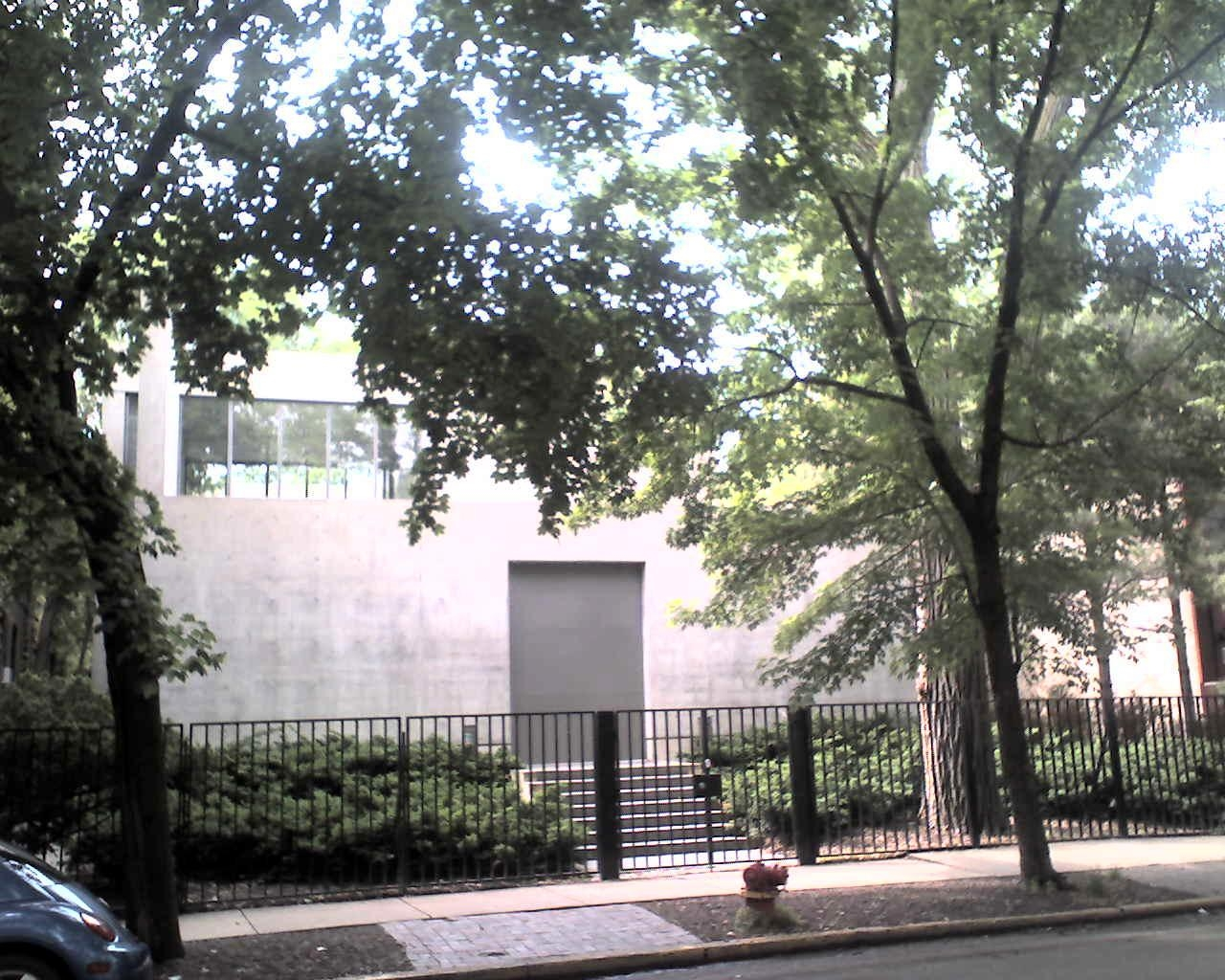
Lincoln park house, Chicago

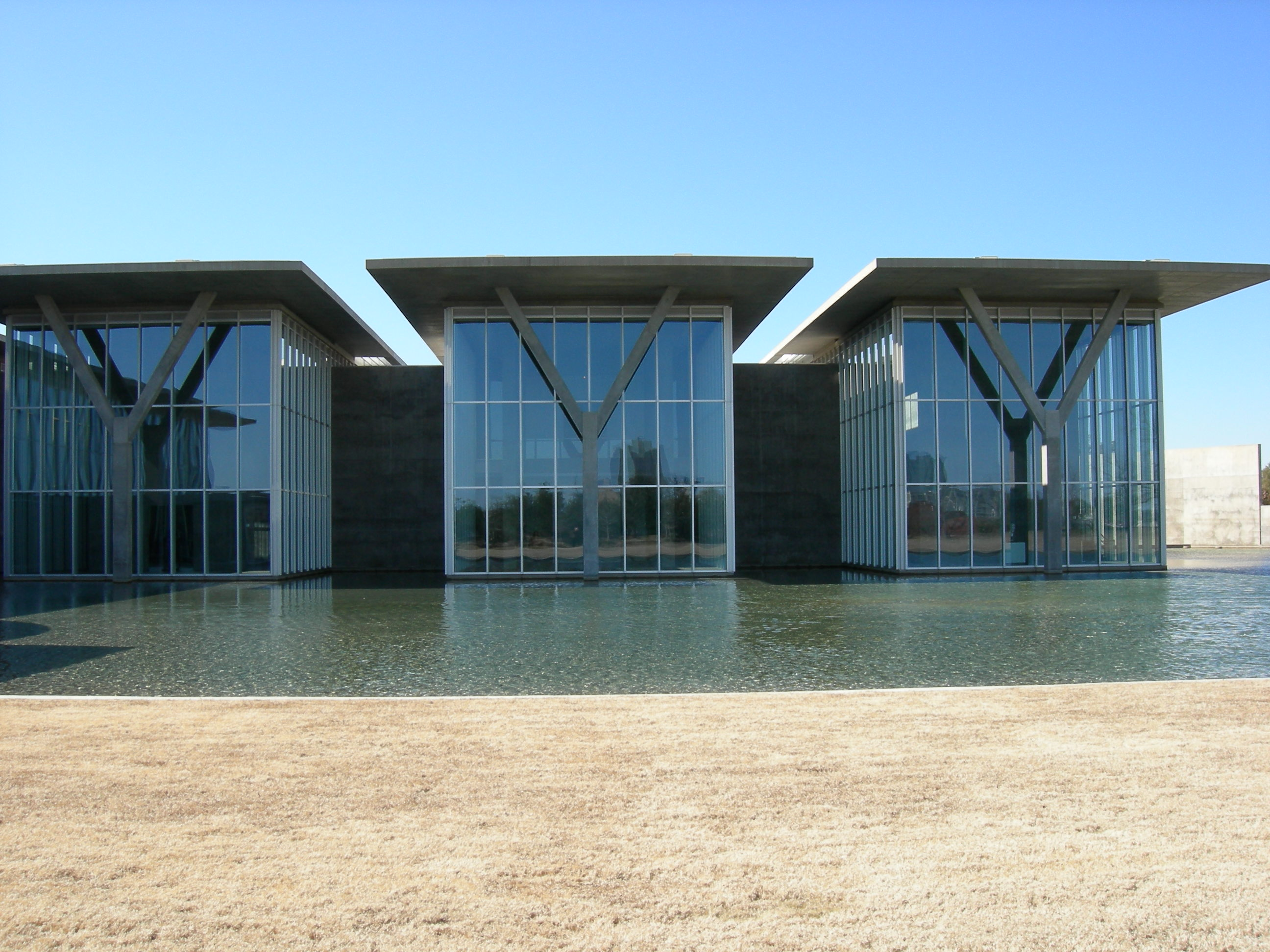
Modern Art Museum of Fort Worth, showing the reflecting pool

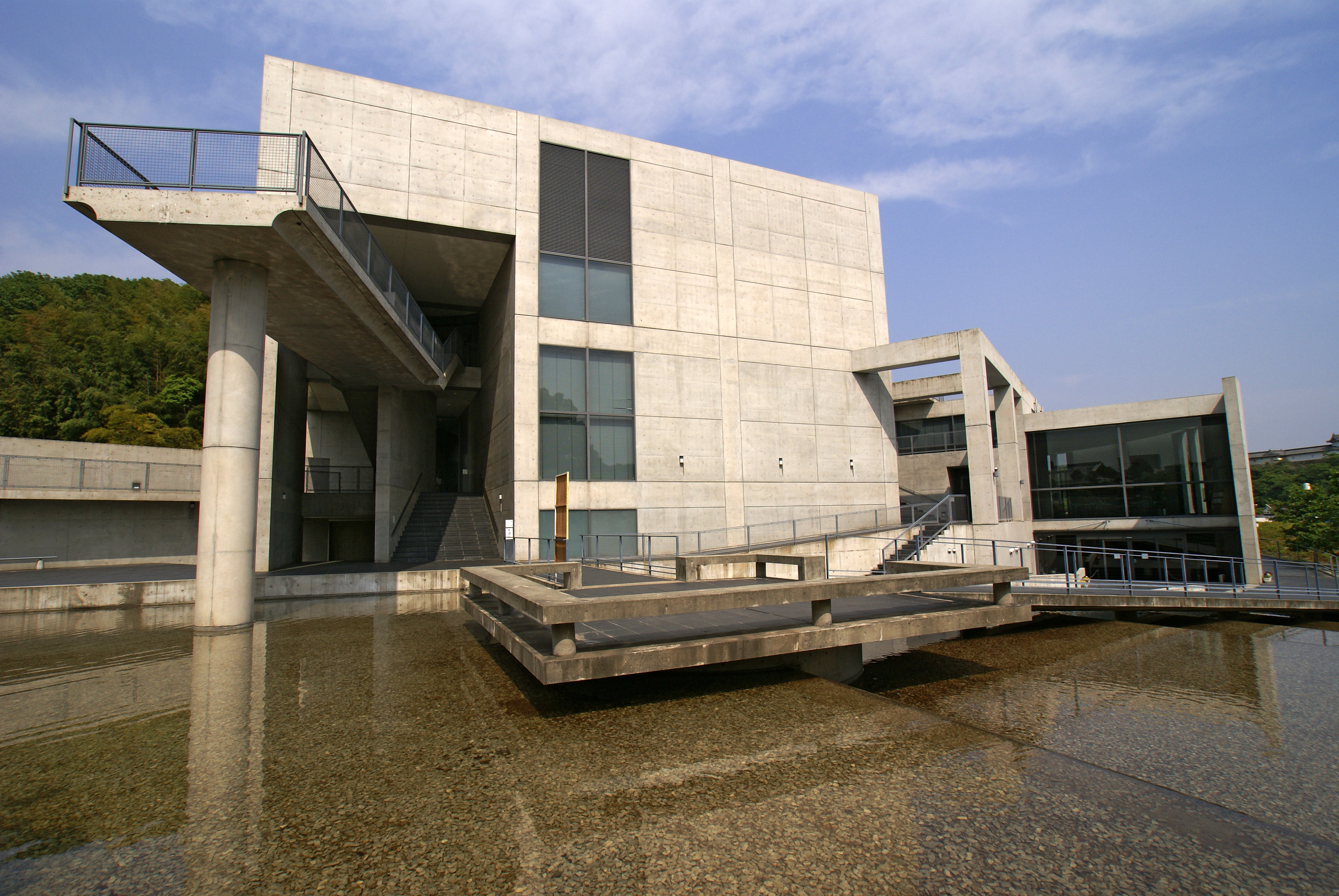
Himeji City Museum of Literature

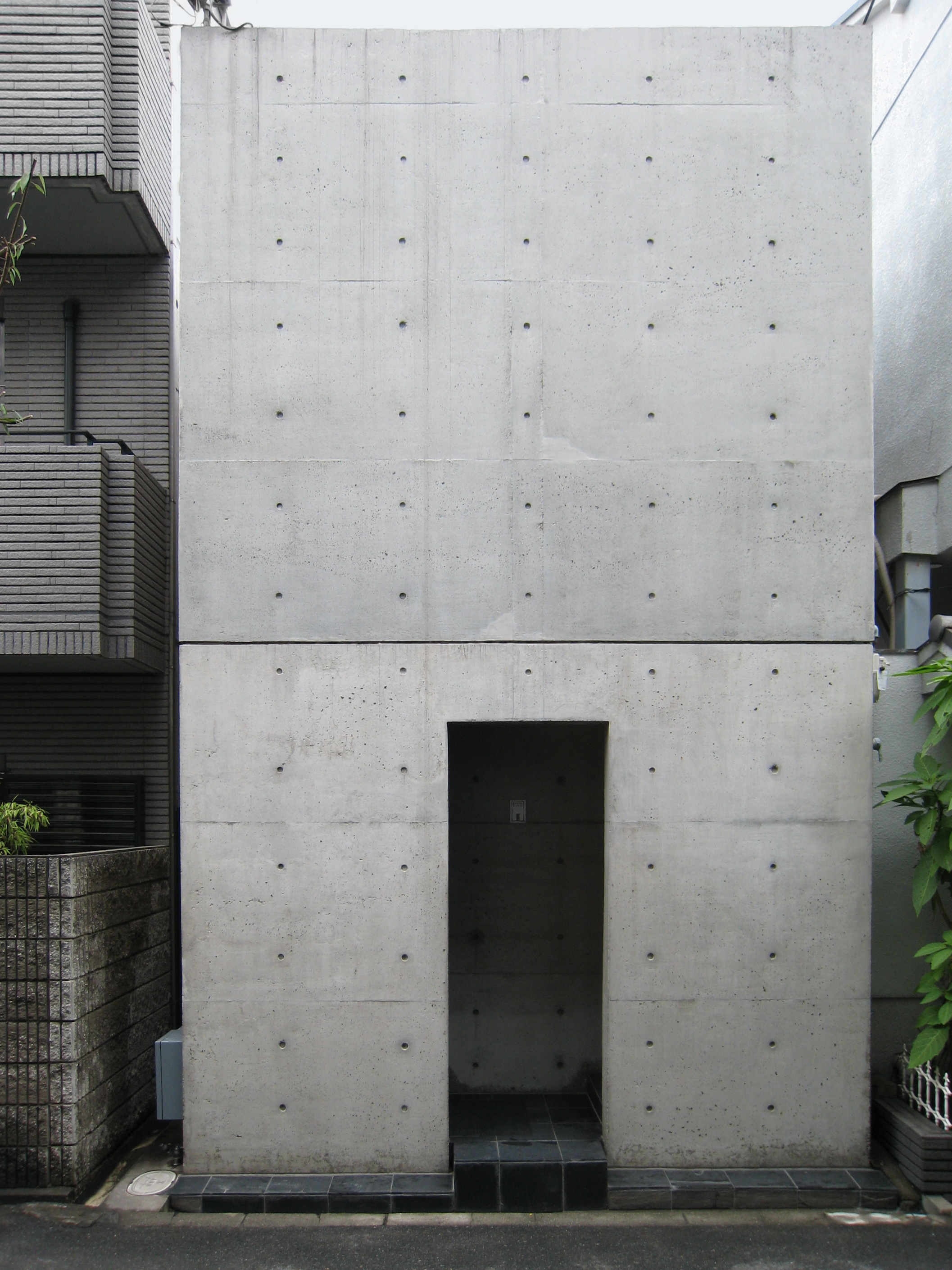
Azuma House

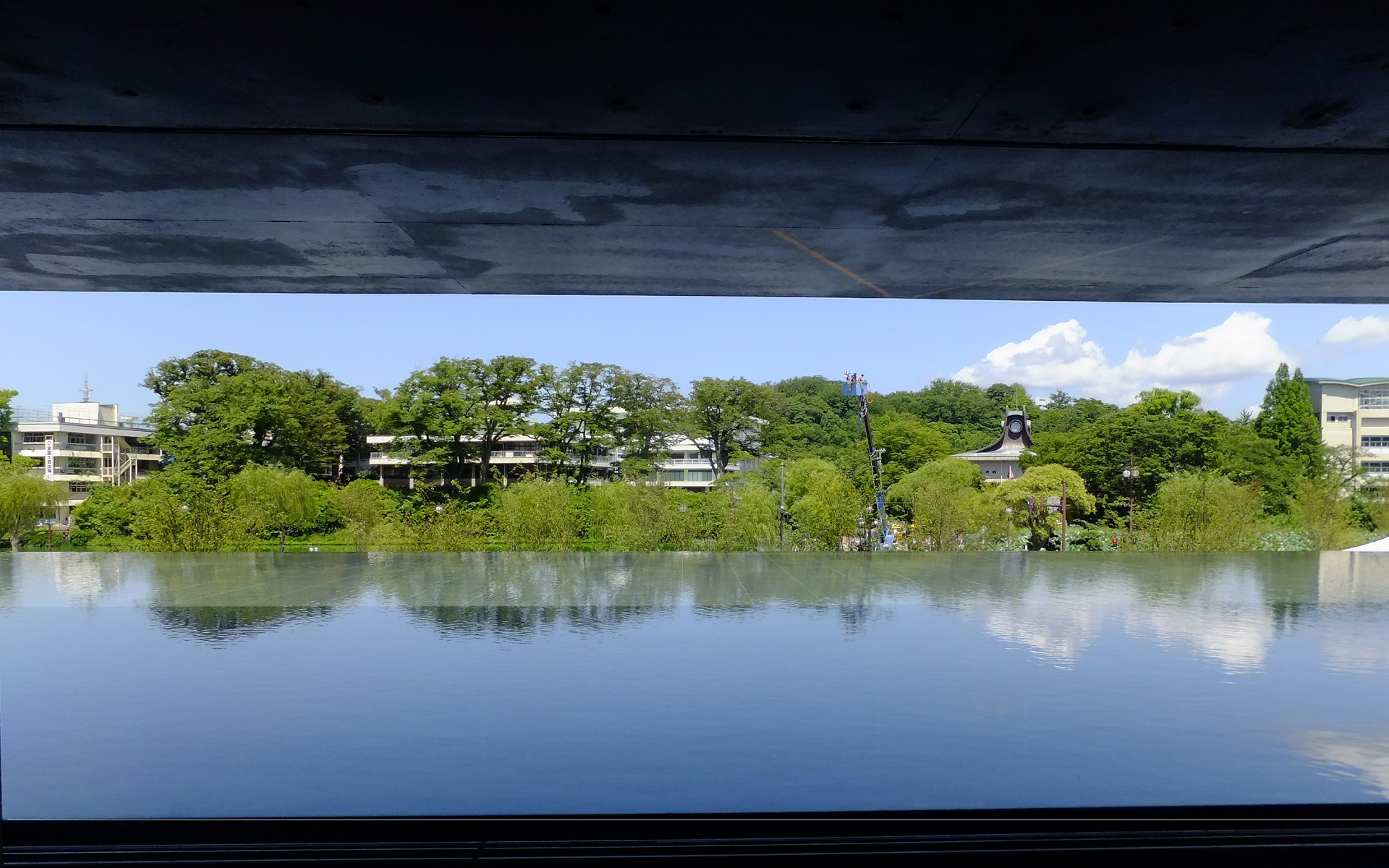
View from Akita Museum of Art

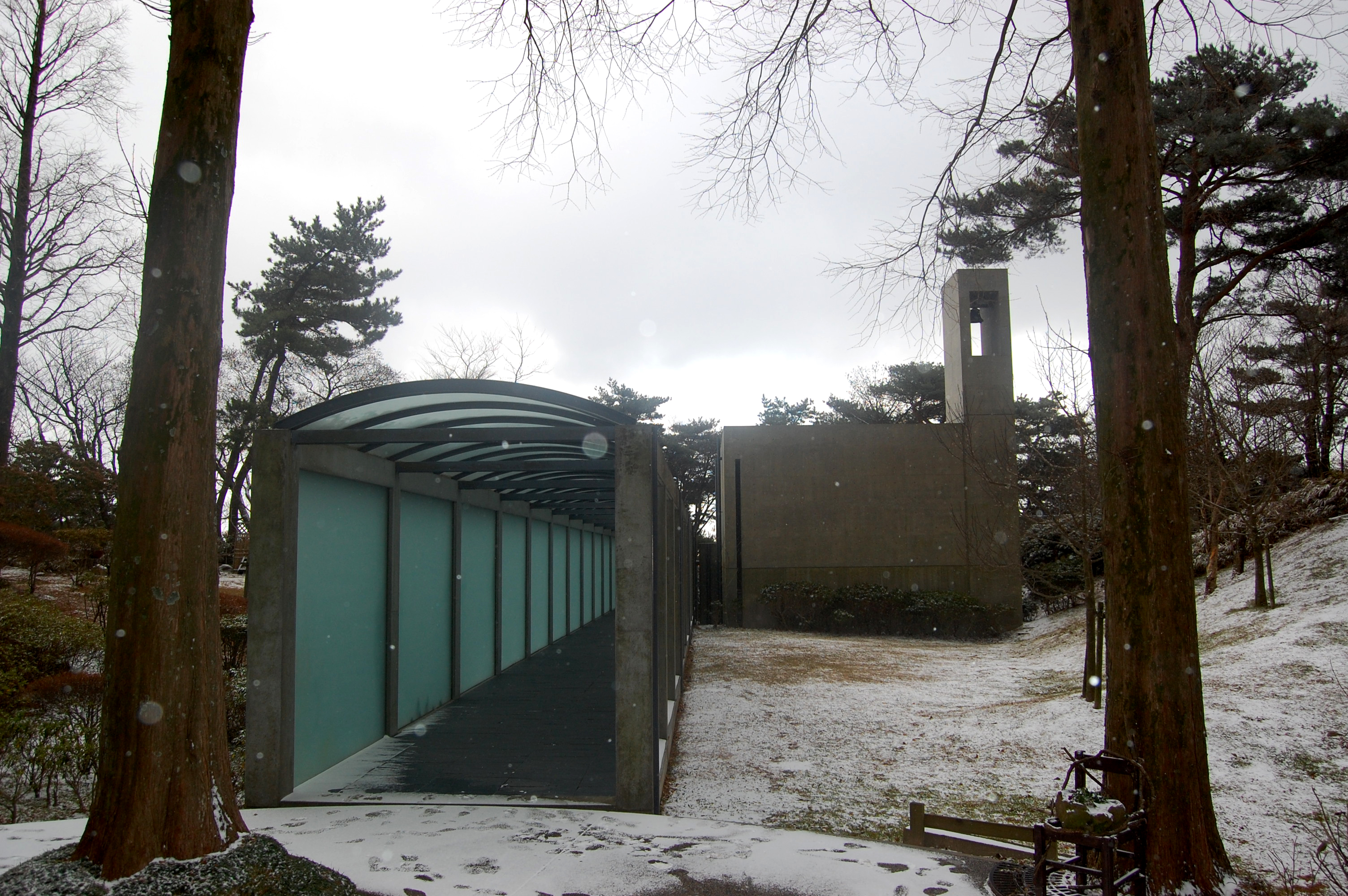
Mount Rokko Chapel

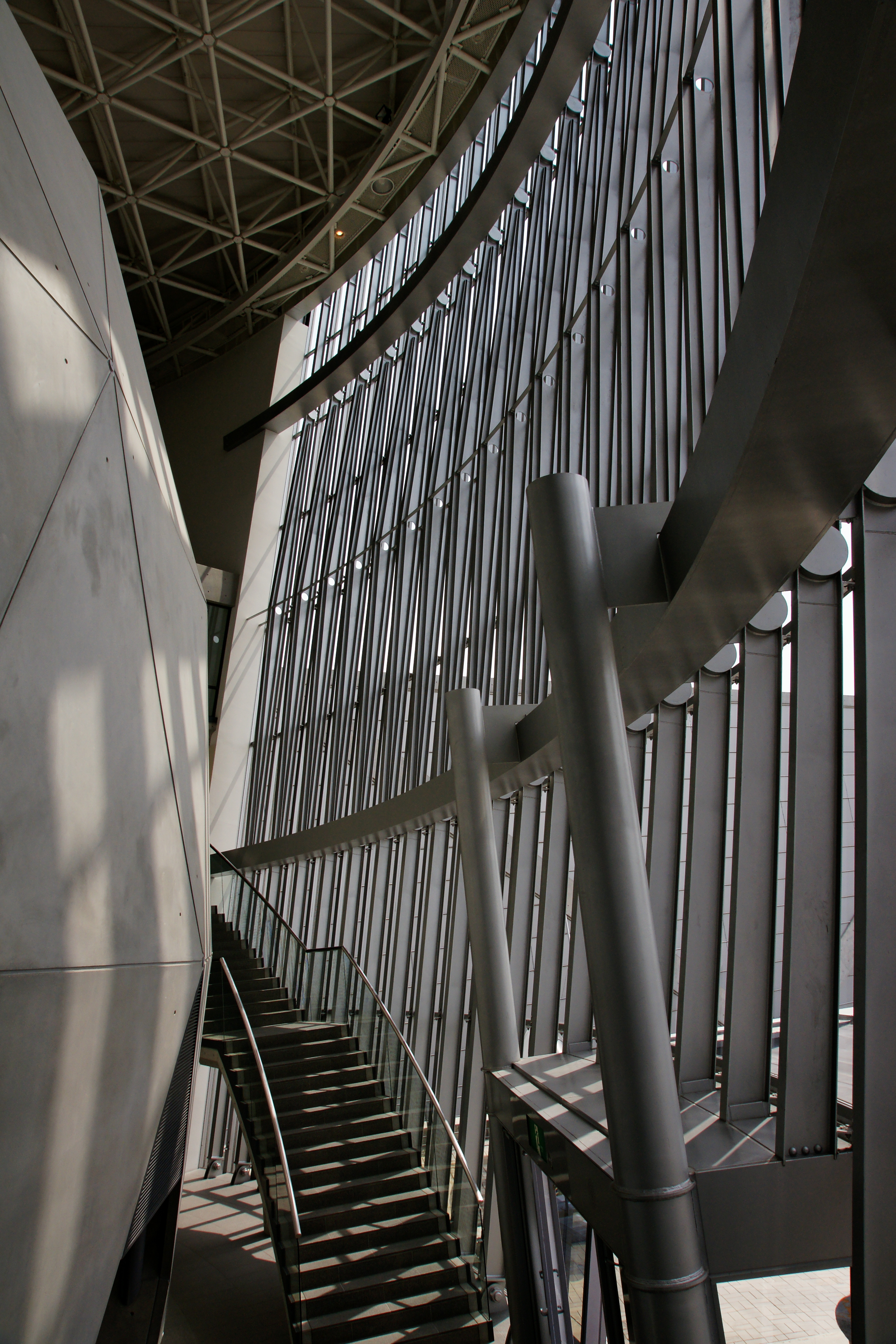
Suntory Museum, showing the staircase and the inside structure

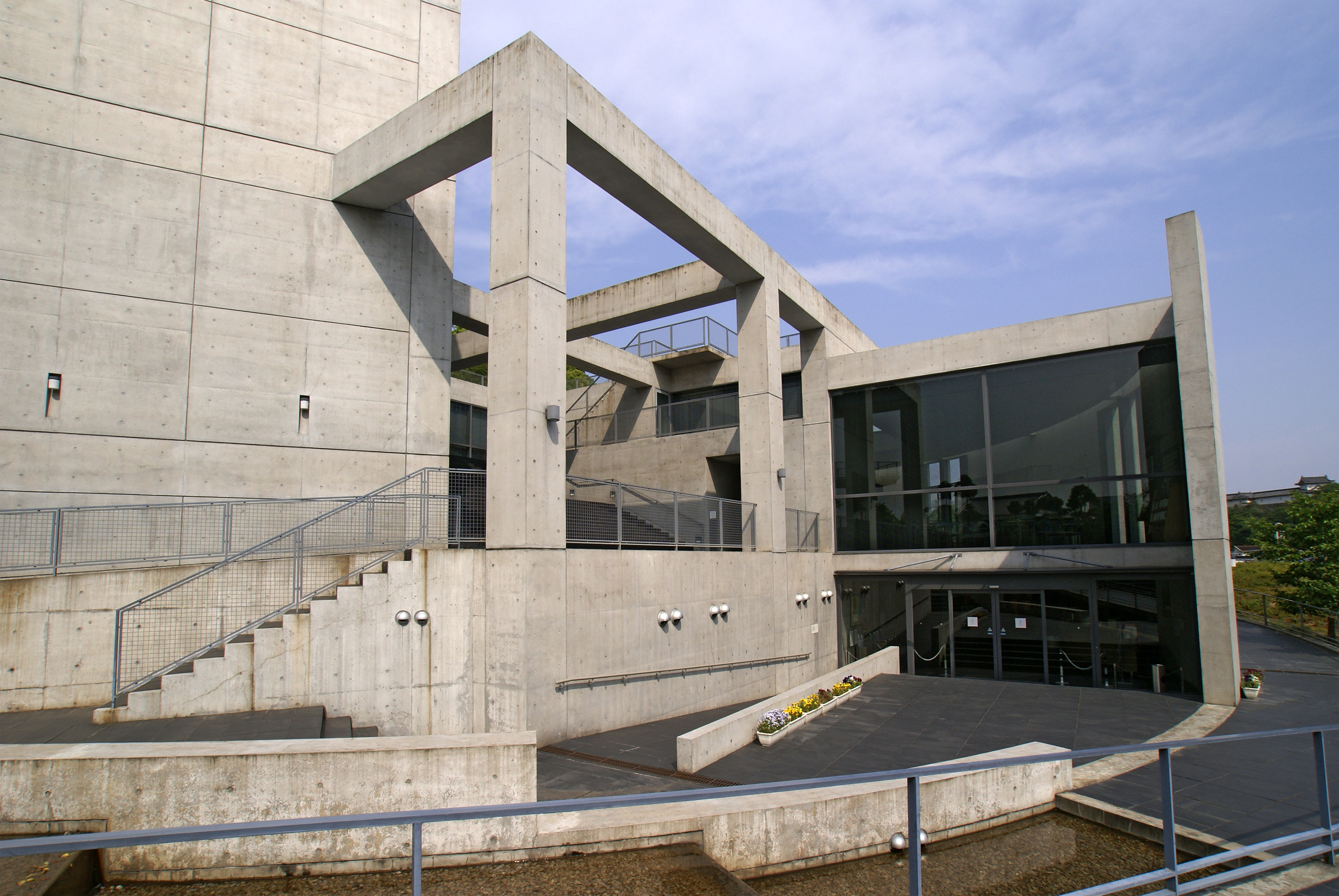
City Museum of Literature

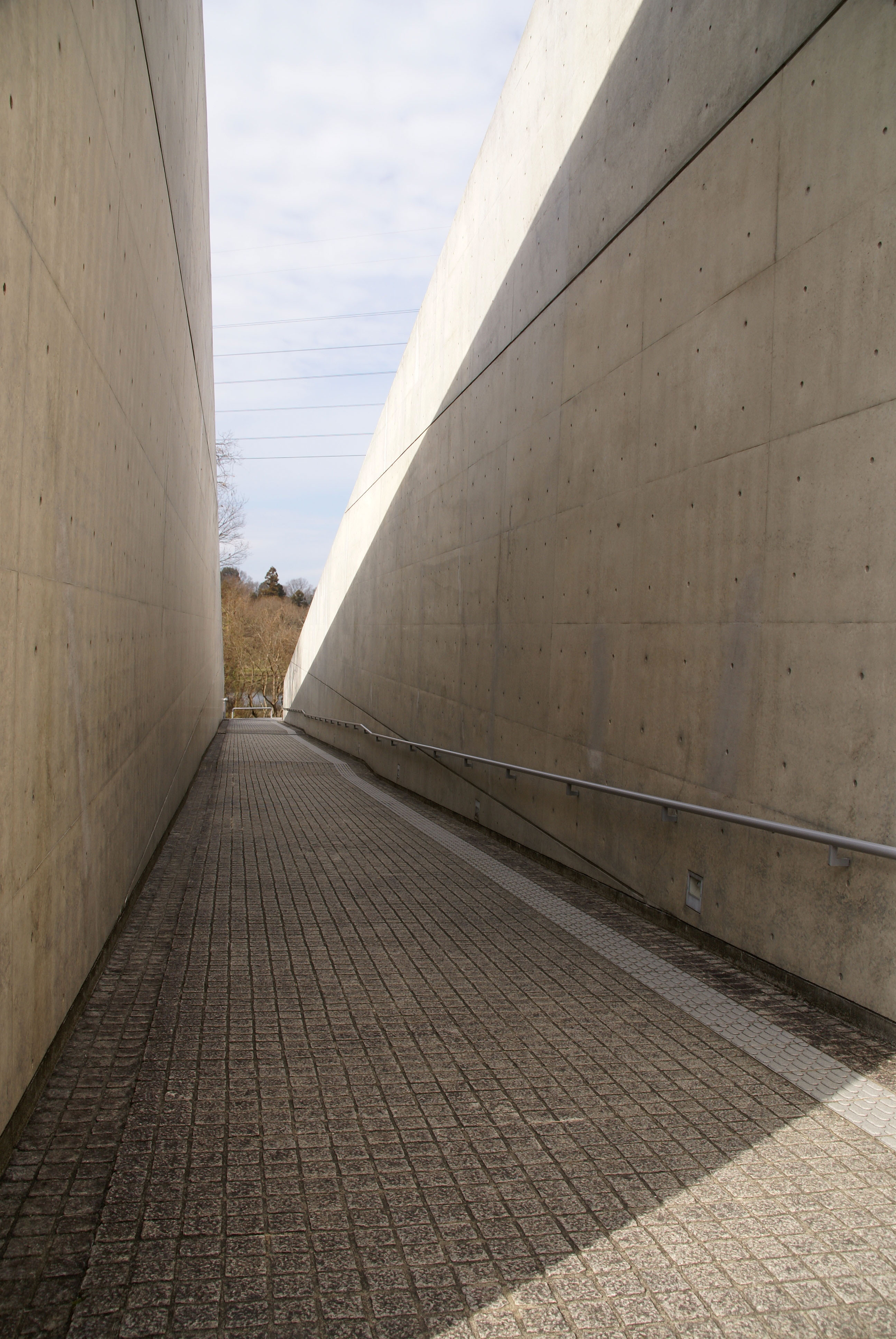
Chikatsu Asuka museum

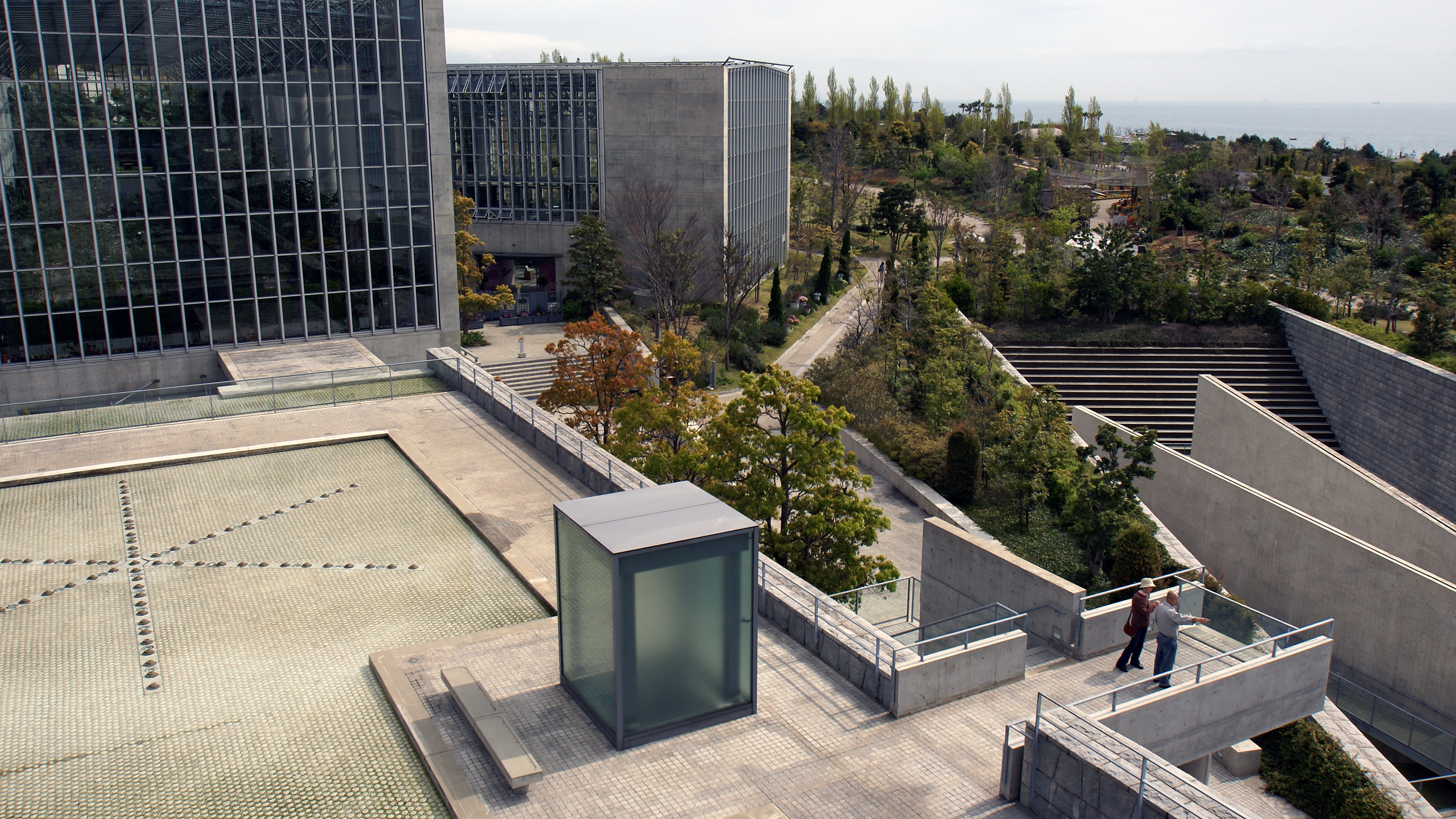
Awaji Yumebutai in Awaji, Hyogo prefecture, Japan

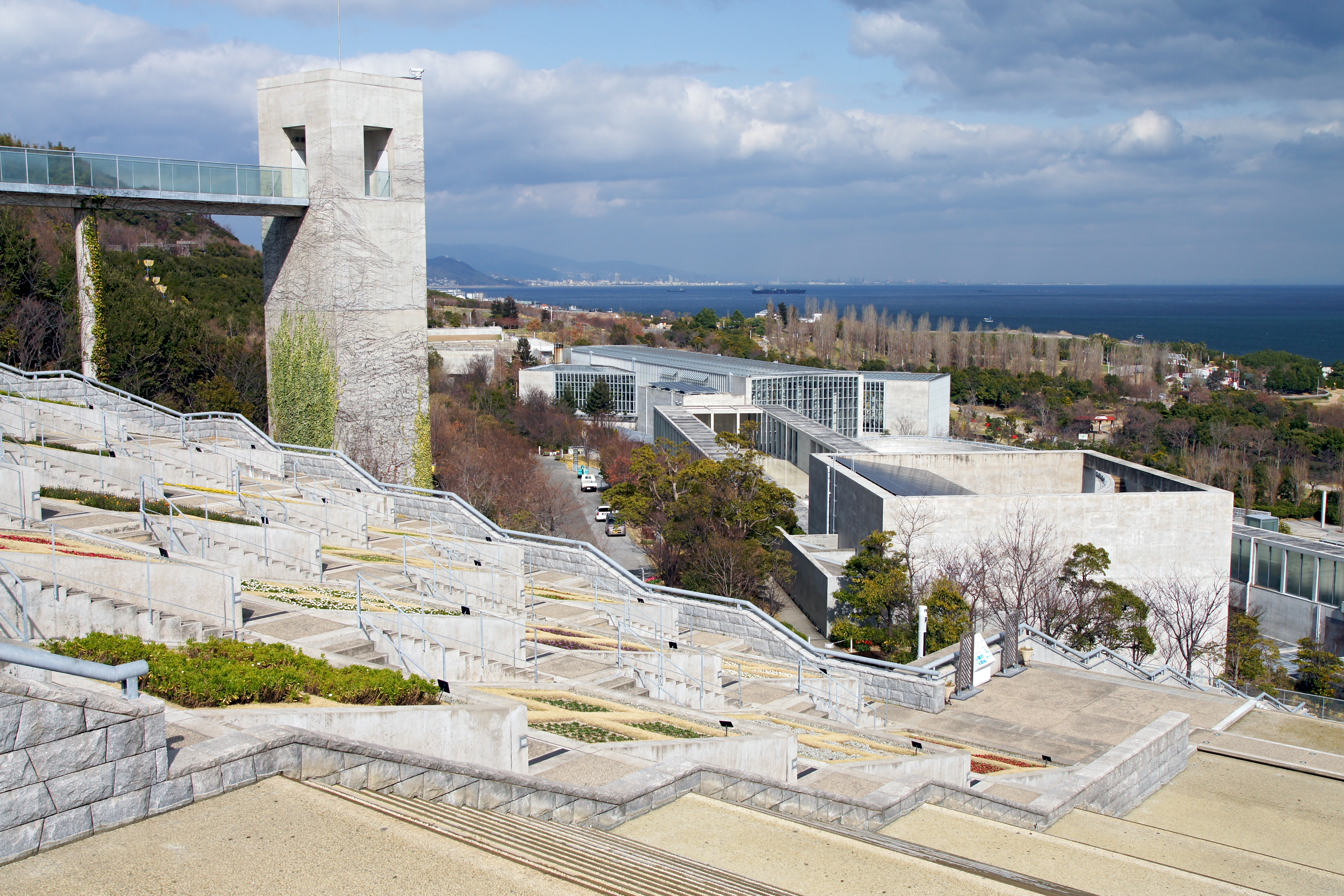
Awaji Yumebutai, showing the view and the stairs down

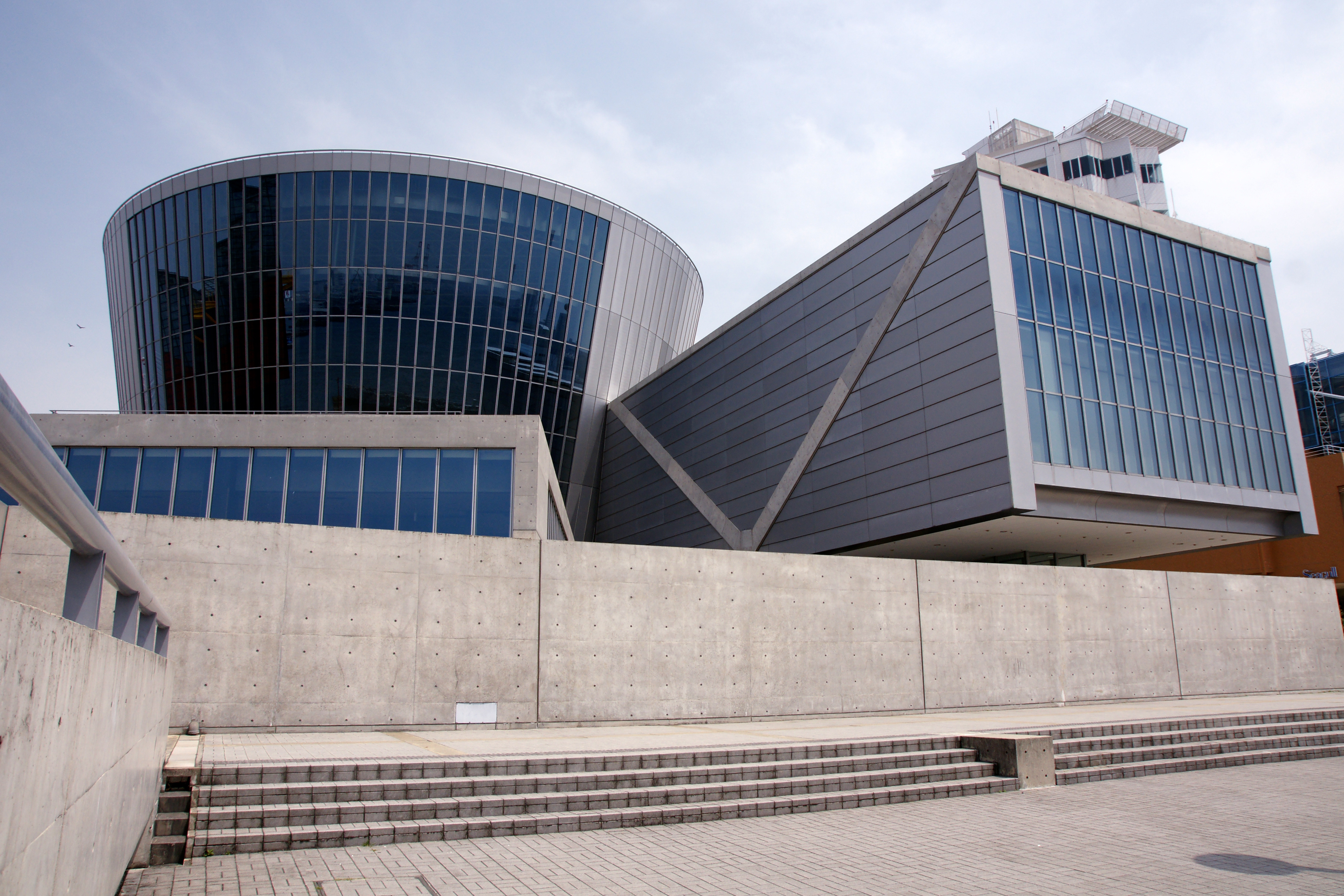
Suntory Museum, the parallelepiped intersecting the spherical body of the IMAX theatre, shown in profile

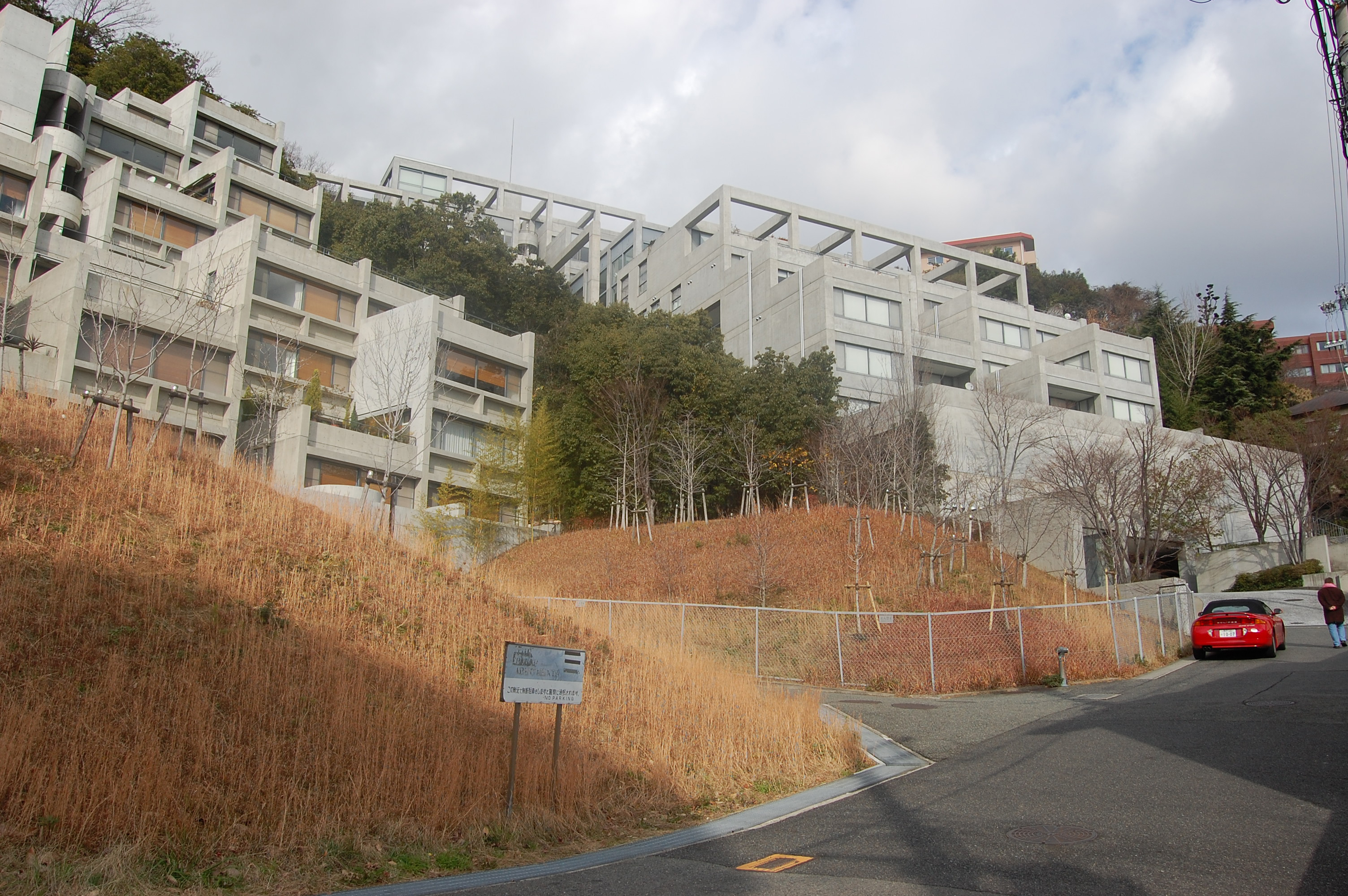
Rokko Housing I and II, Kobe

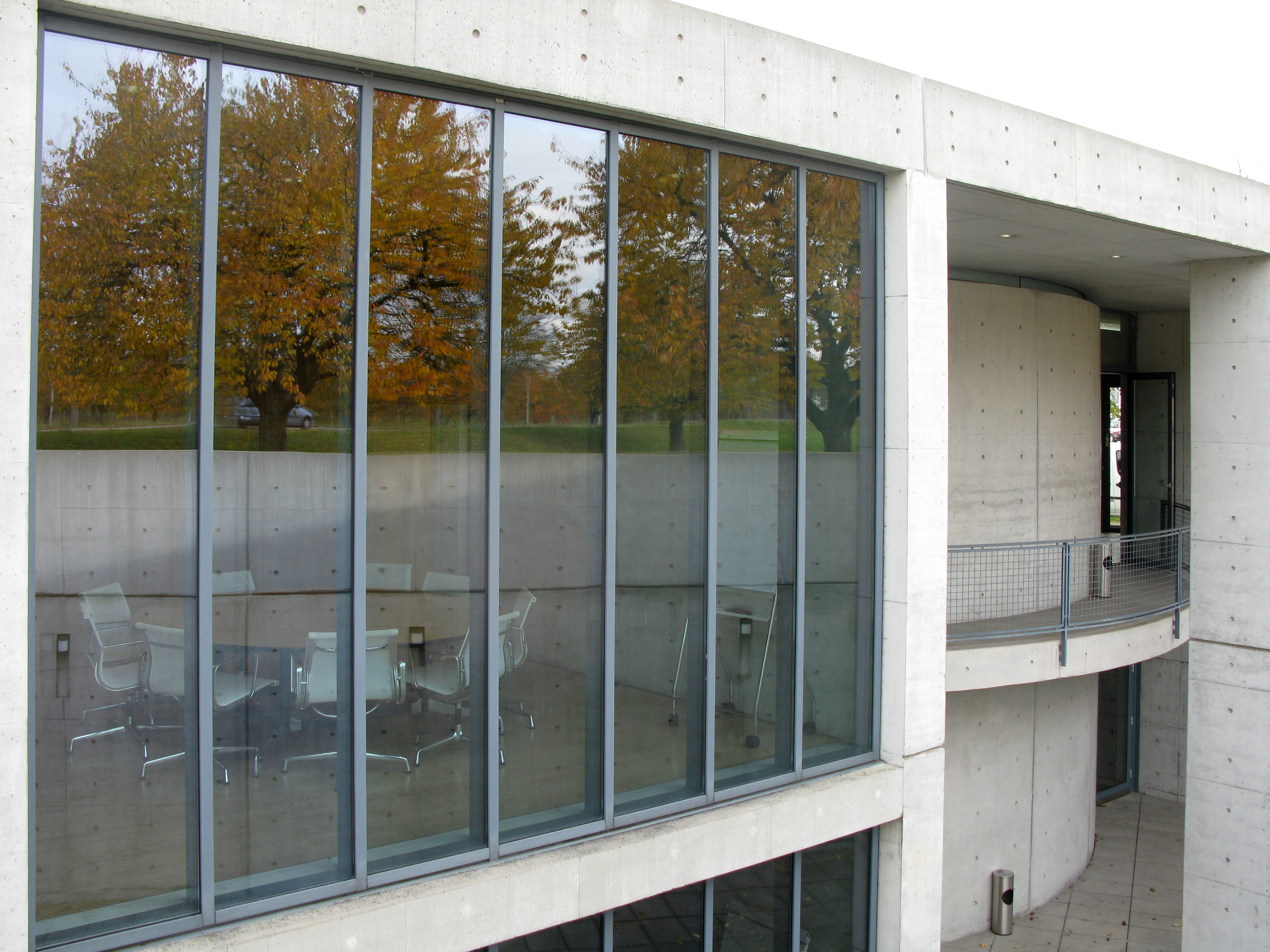
Vitra Conference Pavillon

Langen Foundation at night

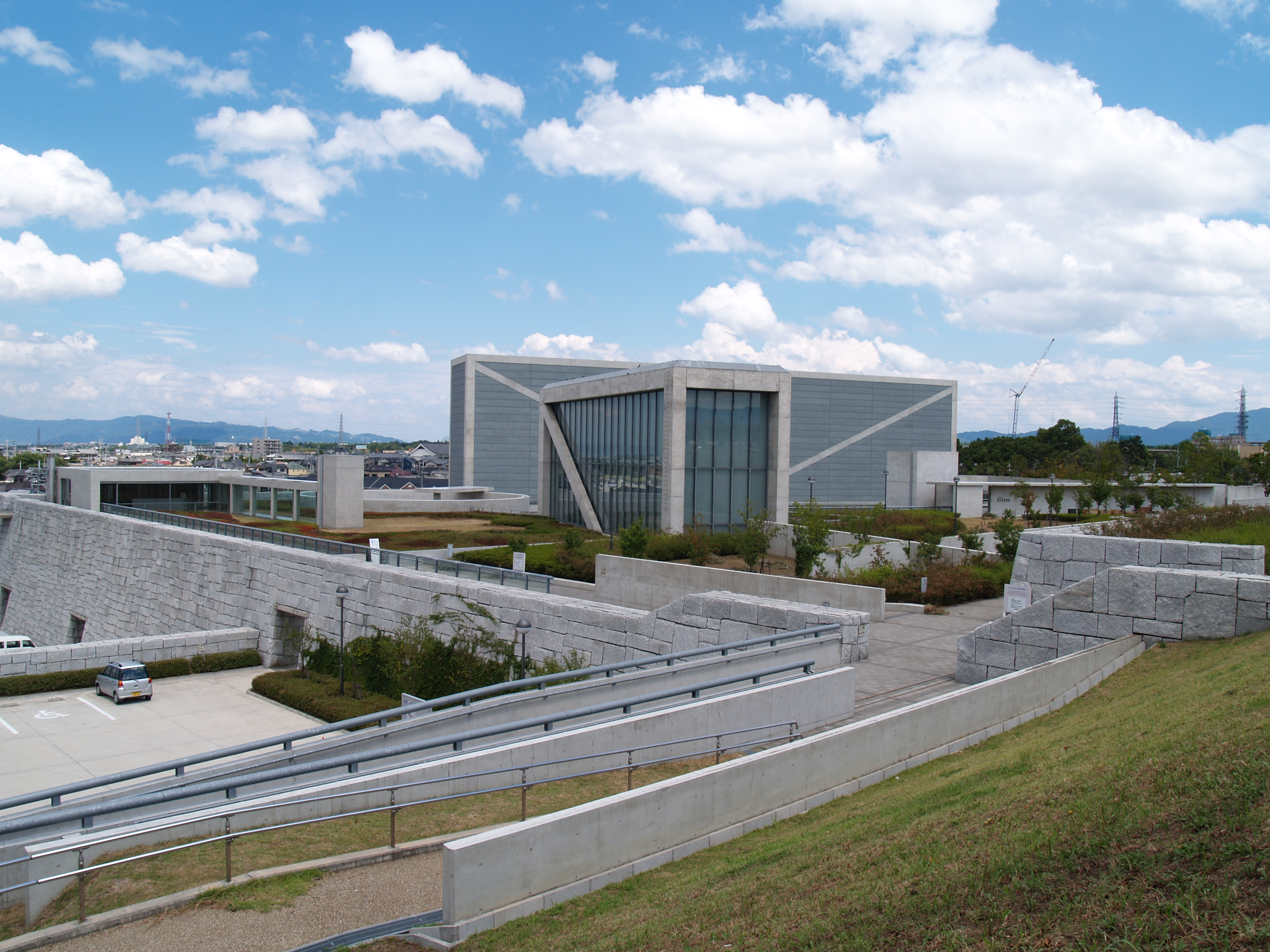
Osaka Prefectural Sayamaike Museum

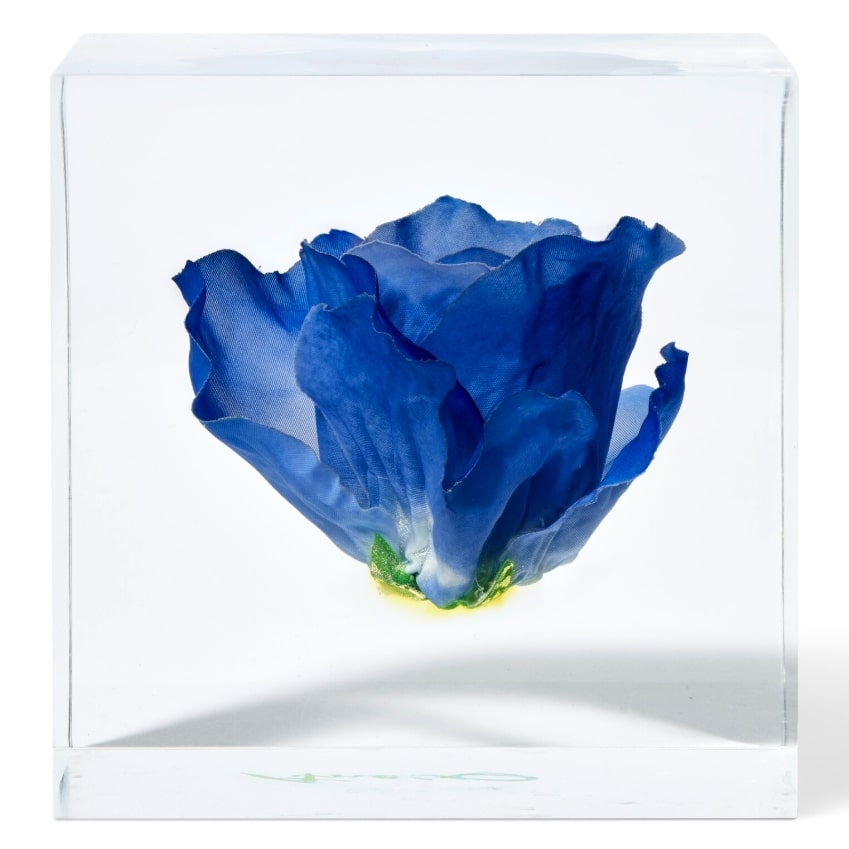
Blue Rose in the Cube Study 1

== Awards ==
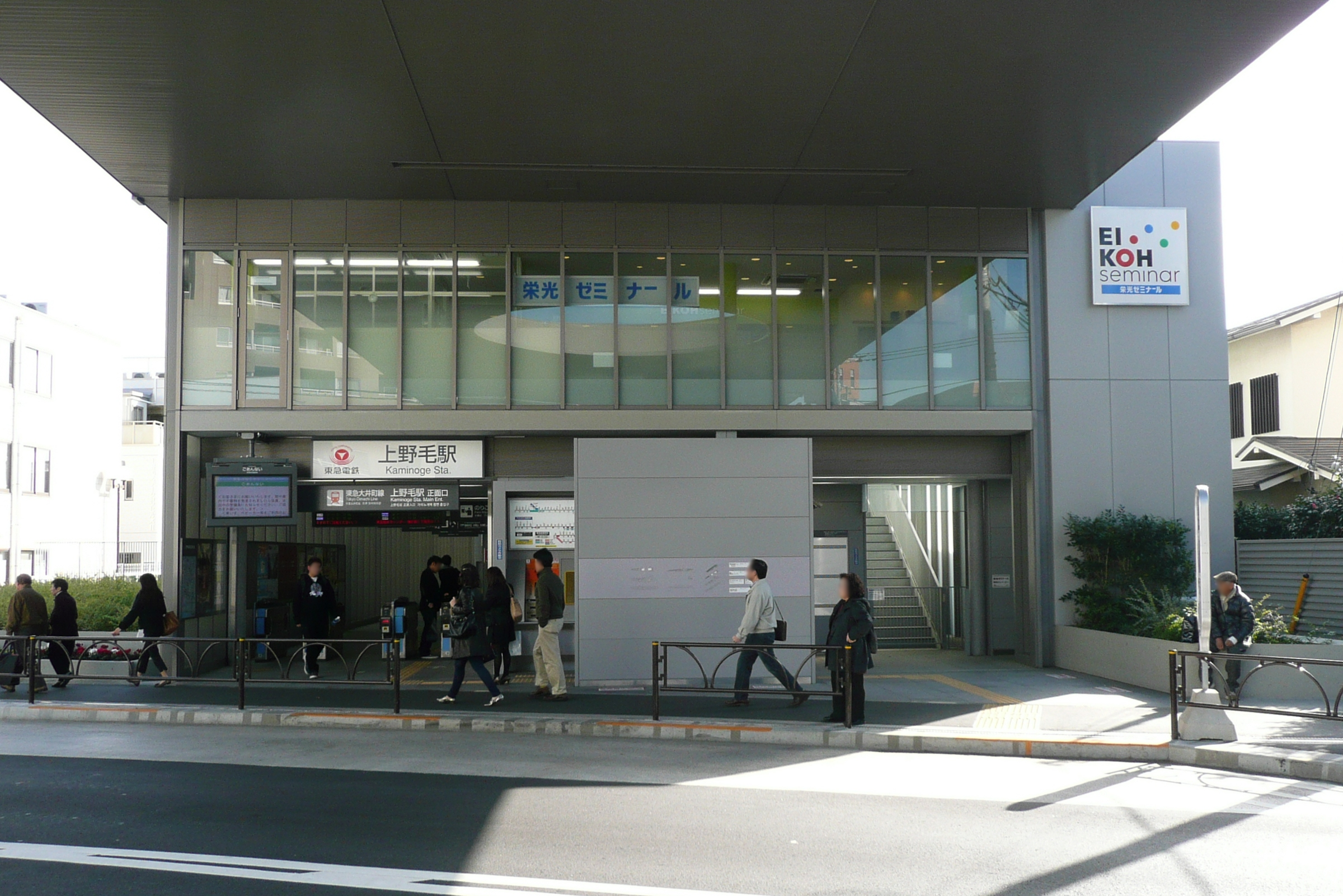
Kaminoge Station in Tokyo

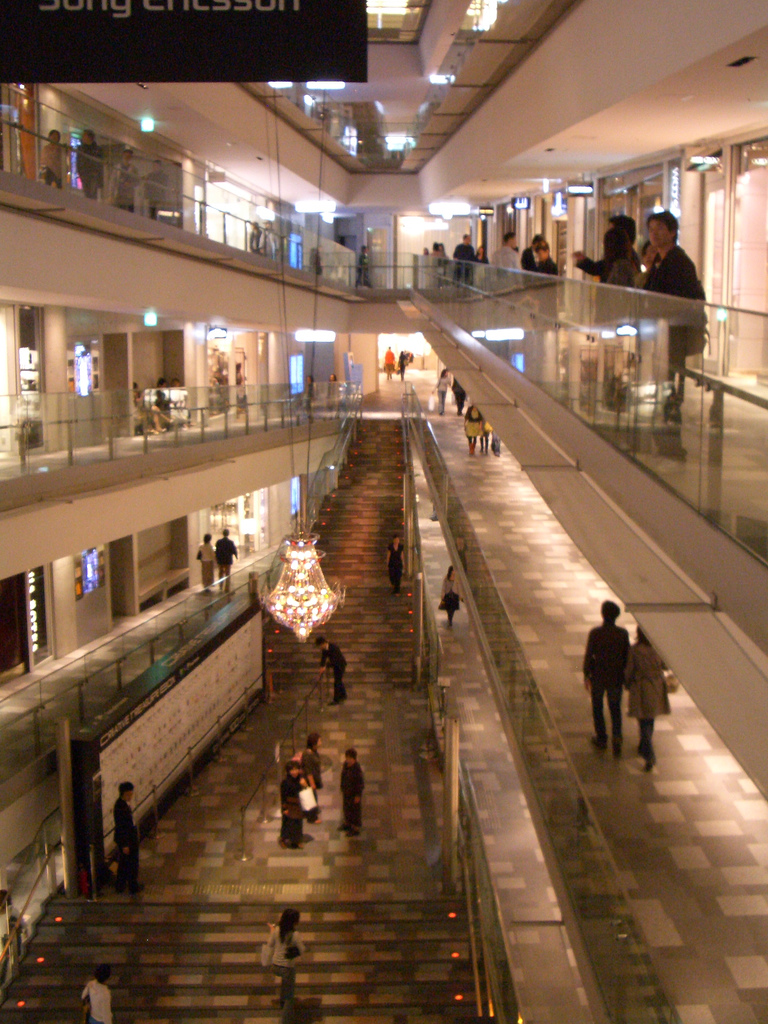
The interior of the Omotesando Hills shopping complex in Tokyo

Award	Organization/location	Country	Date
Annual Prize (Row House, Sumiyoshi)	Architectural Institute of Japan	Japan	1979
Cultural Design Prize (Rokko Housing One and Two)	Tokyo	Japan	1983
Alvar Aalto Medal	Finnish Association of Architects	Finland	1985
Gold Medal of Architecture	French Academy of Architecture	France	1989
Carlsberg Architectural Prize (International)	New Carlsberg Foundation, Copenhagen	Denmark	1992
Japan Art Academy Prize	Japan Art Academy	Japan	1993
Asahi Prize	Tokyo	Japan	1994
Pritzker Architecture Prize (International)	Chicago	United States	1995
Chevalier de l'Ordre des Arts et des Lettres	Paris	France	1995
Praemium Imperiale First “FRATE SOLE” Award in Architecture	Japan Art Association	Japan	1996
Officier de l'Ordre des Arts et des Lettres	Paris	France	1997
Royal Gold Medal	RIBA	Great Britain	1997
AIA Gold Medal	American Institute of Architects	United States	2002
Kyoto Prize	Inamori Foundation	Japan	2002
Person of Cultural Merit	Ministry of Education, Culture, Sports, Science and Technology	Japan	2003
UIA Gold Medal	International Union of Architects	France	2005
Order of Culture	The Emperor	Japan	2010
Neutra Medal for Professional Excellence	Cal Poly Pomona College of Environmental Design	United States	2012
Grand Officer of the Order of the Star of Italy	Rome	Italy	2013
Commandeur de l'Ordre des Arts et des Lettres	Paris	France	2013
Commandeur de l'Ordre de la Légion d'Honneur	Paris	France	2021
Compasso d'Oro	Milan	Italy	2024

== Art ==
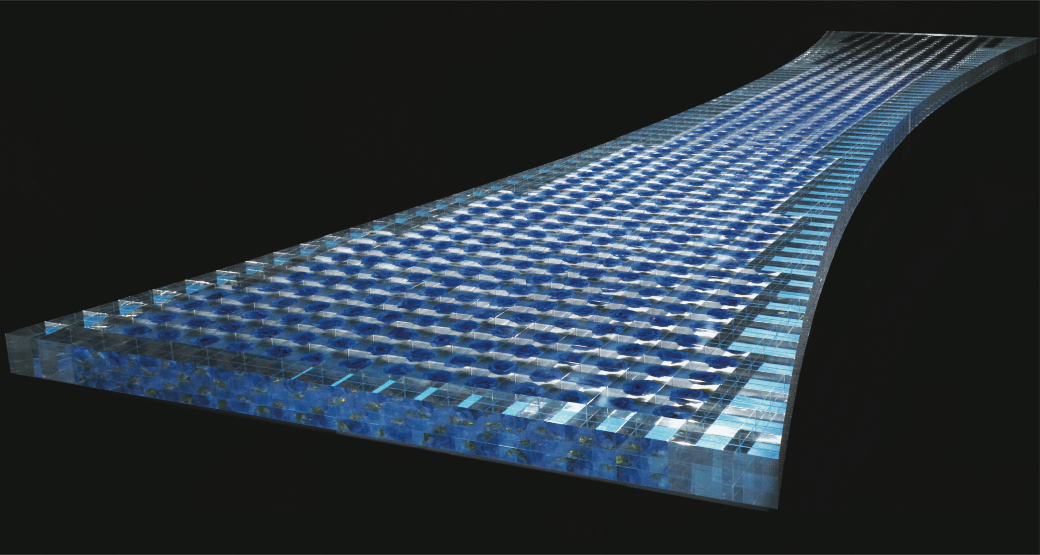
Table of Pirosmani

Although widely known for his architecture rooted in Japanese minimalism and spiritual abstraction, Ando has also pursued sculpture and conceptual art.

One of his sculptural endeavors is the Table of Pirosmani project, a meditative work conceived as a tribute to a metaphorical collective grave of fallen dreams. Art historian and curator Bernhard Boehler described the work: "The blue rose, historically a symbol of the impossible or the unattainable, becomes in Ando’s hands a quiet metaphor for unfulfilled desire, unloved hidden lives, and forgotten beauty."

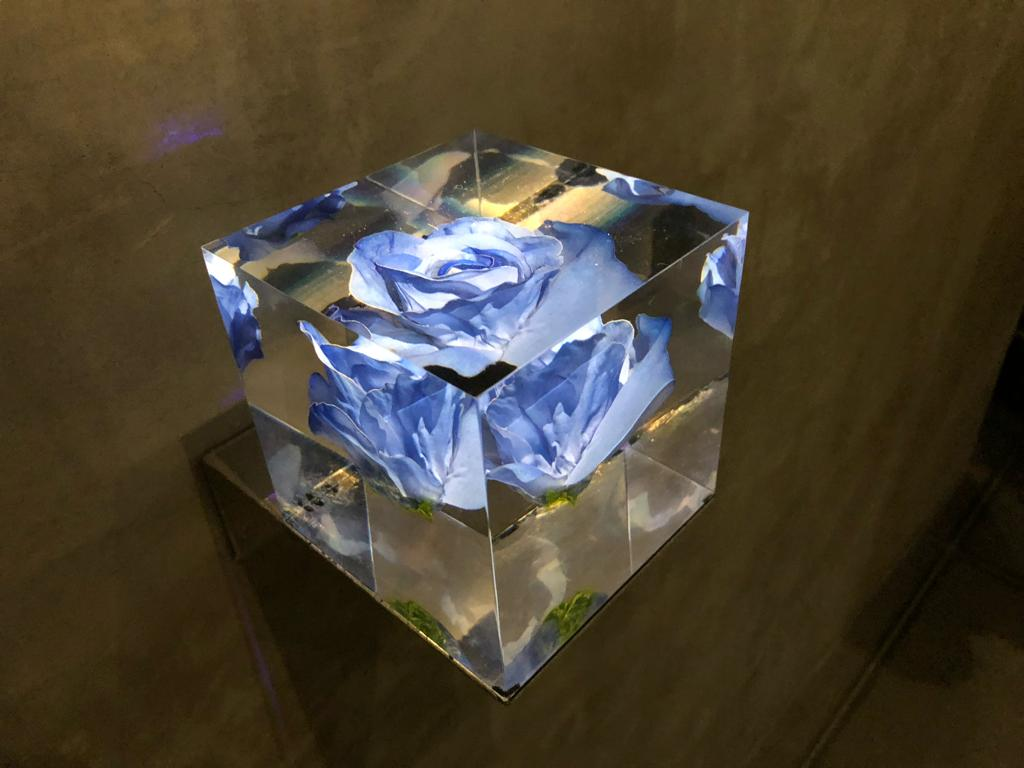
Blue Rose in the Cube Study 1 shown in "The Challenge" Armani/Silos exhibition in 2019

In 2018, Ando created a rare prototype titled Blue Rose in the Cube Study 1, a single rose suspended in a minimalist acrylic block. This piece marked the conceptual genesis of the full-scale Table of Pirosmani and remained in private collection until it appeared at Christie’s Post-War and Contemporary Art Online auction on March 12, 2025.

The work achieved a sale price of $114,400, nearly nine times its low estimate of $12,600—an 804% increase. It ranked first among the top ten highest-value sales at the auction, outperforming works by David Hockney and Banksy.

== Exhibition Information ==
An exhibition titled Tadao Ando: Youth was held from March 20 to July 21, 2025, at VS., a cultural apparatus located within Grand Green Osaka Ume-kita Park in Osaka, Japan.

== Literature ==
- Francesco Dal Co. Tadao Ando: Complete Works. Phaidon Press, 1997. ISBN 0-7148-3717-2
- Kenneth Frampton. Tadao Ando: Buildings, Projects, Writings. Rizzoli International Publications, 1984. ISBN 0-8478-0547-6
- Randall J. Van Vynckt. International Dictionary of Architects and Architecture. St. James Press, 1993. ISBN 1-55862-087-7
- Masao Furuyama. “Tadao Ando”. Taschen, 2006. ISBN 978-3-8228-4895-1
- Werner Blaser, “Tadao Ando, Architecktur der Stille, Architecture of silence” Birkhäuser, 2001. ISBN 3-7643-6448-3
- Jin Baek, “Nothingness: Tadao Ando’s Christian Sacred Space”. Routledge, 2009. ISBN 978-0-415-47854-0
