= MUU =

MUU, muu, or, variation, may refer to:

== People and characters ==
- Muu Blanco (born 1966), Venezuelan artist
- Muu Ki Hien (born 1963; simplified Chinese: 巫启贤; traditional Chinese: 巫啟賢), Malaysian singer-songwriter; see List of Hakka people

=== Fictional characters ===
- Muu (Japanese: ムー, romanized: Mū), a fictional character from Lucifer and the Biscuit Hammer

== Places ==
- MUU, the Marconi station in Carnarvon, Wales, UK; see List of Marconi wireless stations
- Muu Waterfall (Korean: 무우폭포; Hanja: 舞雩瀑布), Gyeonggi, South Korea; see List of waterfalls in South Korea

== Other uses ==
- Yaaku language (ISO 639 language code muu) of Kenya

== See also ==
- Muus (surname)
- Muumuu (disambiguation)
- Moo (disambiguation)
- MMU (disambiguation)
- MU (disambiguation)
- MU2 (disambiguation)
- MW (disambiguation)
- MUV (disambiguation)
- MVU (disambiguation)
- MVV (disambiguation)
