= MU =

MU, Mu or μ may refer to:

== Language ==
- Mu (letter) (uppercase: Μ; lowercase: μ), the Greek alphabet's 12th letter
- Mu (kana), む or ム, a Japanese kana
- Mu (cuneiform), a sign in cuneiform writing
- Mu (negative), a word meaning "no" or "without" (Japanese: 無; Korean: 무)
- Middle Ukrainian, Ukrainian language 16th–18th century
- Groupe μ, Belgian linguistics group

== Arts and entertainment ==
=== Film and television ===
- Aries Mu, a character from the anime Saint Seiya
- Mu La Flaga, a character from the anime Mobile Suit Gundam SEED
- Monsters University, a 2013 animated film by Disney and Pixar
- "μ's" (pronounced "Muse") is the name of the protagonist school idol group in the anime series Love Live!
- Miss Universe, one of the Big Four international women's beauty pageants, founded in 1952

=== Literature ===
- MU Press (short for "Miscellanea Unlimited Press"; c. 1990–2006), a Seattle-based publisher of primarily "furry" comic books
- Mu Dan (1918–1977), Chinese poet and translator

=== Music ===
==== Albums ====
- Mu (album), a pair of free jazz albums by Don Cherry, released in 1969 and 1970
- Mu, by Jah Wobble
- M.U. – The Best of Jethro Tull, a greatest hits album
- Mu Vol. I, an EP album by Richard Henshall, released in 2024, part of a trilogy

==== Music organizations ====
- Mu Performing Arts, an Asian-American theater company and taiko drumming ensemble
- MU, musical group formed by Merrell Fankhauser and Jeff Cotton
- Musicians' Union (United Kingdom)
- Planet Mu, an electronic music label

==== Other uses in music ====
- MU (musician), Mutsumi Kanamori, a Japanese-British musician
- MuseScore, a software GUI program for creating sheet music
- /mu/, a board pertaining to music discussion on 4chan

=== Gaming ===
- Mu Online, a 2003 online role-playing game
- Mu, an ancient civilization from Mega Man Star Force 2
- Mu-12, a character from the BlazBlue series
- Colony Mu, a location from Xenoblade Chronicles 3

== Science, technology, and mathematics ==
=== Computing and electronics ===
- μ, in evolutionary algorithms, the population size from which in each generation λ offspring will generate
- .mu, the ccTLD of Mauritius
- Mu Dynamics, a Sunnyvale-based company that makes software and hardware for testing network services, owned by Spirent Communications plc
- Micron Technology (NASDAQ symbol MU), a Boise-based semiconductor company that manufactures computer memory and data storage products
- Olympus mju (stylised as μ[mju:]), series of a compact cameras

=== Physics ===
- Coefficient of friction, used to approximate the force of friction
- Deformation (physics), as the "unit" of strain
- Electron mobility, relating the drift of electrons to the applied electric field across a material
- Linear density, a measure of mass per unit of length
- Magnetic dipole moment, a measure of the strength of a system's net magnetic source
- Mu-metal, a nickel-iron alloy with high magnetic permeability
- Muon, an elementary particle
- Muonium, exotic atoms made up of an antimuon and an electron
- Permeability (electromagnetism) coefficient, degree of magnetization of a material
- Proton-to-electron mass ratio, a dimensionless physical constant
- Reduced mass, the "effective" inertial mass appearing in the two-body problem
- Standard gravitational parameter of a celestial body
- Viscosity, the resistance of a fluid being deformed by stress

=== Chemistry ===
- Chemical potential, a form of potential energy that can be absorbed or released during a chemical reaction
- Bridging ligand, an atom that connects two or more metal centers in a complex (molecule)

=== Biology and medicine ===
- Bacteriophage Mu, a muvirus of the family Myoviridae of double-stranded DNA non-enveloped contractile tail bacterial viruses
- Map unit (m.u.) or centimorgan, a unit of recombinant frequency in genetics
- Monitor unit (MU), a measure of absorbed dose from a linear accelerator in radiation therapy = 0.001 Gray
- SARS-CoV-2 Mu variant, one of the variants of SARS-CoV-2, the virus that causes COVID-19
- Mouse unit (MU), the amount of toxin required to kill a 20g mouse in 15 minutes via intraperitoneal injection

=== Measurement ===
- μ-/micro-, metric prefix denoting a factor of 10^{−6} (one millionth)
- Micrometre (deprecated as a single-character symbol "μ" for micron)
- Million units of energy, a term used in India for a gigawatt-hour; see Kilowatt-hour § Other related energy units
- Mu (land), a Chinese unit of area also spelled "mou", equivalent to about 0.066 hectares

=== Mathematics ===
- MU puzzle, from the Douglas Hofstadter book Gödel, Escher, Bach
- mu operator, a prefix operator μ that finds the minimum natural number that satisfies some predicate
- Möbius function μ(n), a multiplicative function in number theory and combinatorics
- Membership function (mathematics), μ_{A}, the m of a fuzzy set (U, m)
- Set function μ, in measure theory
- MU and μ, symbols relating to complex cobordism, an extraordinary cohomology theory
- Population mean (symbol μ)

=== Other uses in science and technology ===
- The mu (μ) ring of Uranus

== Transportation ==
- Mu (rocket family), a Japanese rocket family launched between 1966 and 2006
- China Eastern Airlines, Shanghai, China, IATA code
- Multiple unit, self-propelled train carriages capable of coupling with other units of similar type
- Isuzu MU, a compact sport/utility vehicle

== Places ==
=== Mythical places ===
- Mu (mythical lost continent), a mythical continent in the Pacific Ocean

=== Other places ===
- Mu River (Irrawaddy), a river in Burma (Myanmar)
- Mu River (Hokkaidō), a river in Japan
- Mù, a village in the Edolo municipality of Italy
- Mauritius (ISO 3166-1 alpha-2 country code MU)

== Religion and philosophy ==
- Mu (negative), 無, a concept in Buddhism
- Muism (Korean shamanism), the native religion of Korea
- Mu (shaman), a Korean priest
- Church of England in Hunters Hill, New South Wales, Australia ("early church code" used by NSW Registry of Births Deaths & Marriages)

== People ==
=== Surname ===
- Mu (surname), a romanization of a Chinese family name: most commonly 穆, 牧, or 慕, but other possibilities include 木, 母 [Mǔ], 目, 沐, 睦 and 暮

=== Nobles and royals ===
- Mu family, a powerful Chinese family from the 14th to the 18th century
- Mu of Baekje (580–641), king of Baekje
- Mu of Balhae (died 737), king of Balhae from 718 to 737
- Marquis Mu of Cai, ruler of the state of Cai from 675 to 646 BC
- King Mu of Chu (died 614 BC), king of the state of Chu from 625 to 614 BC
- Emperor Mu of Jin (343–361), emperor of the Eastern Jin Dynasty
- Marquis Mu of Jin (died 812 BC), ruler of the state of Jin from c. 798 to 776 BC
- King Mu of Zhou (died 922 BC), king of the state of Zhou from c. 976 to 922 BC

=== Other people ===
- Athing Mu-Nikolayev (born 2002 as Mu), American middle-distance runner
- Mu Dan (1918–1977), Chinese poet and translator

== Universities ==
=== Australia ===
- Macquarie University, Sydney, New South Wales
- Monash University, Melbourne, Victoria
- Murdoch University, Perth, Western Australia

=== India ===
- Madras University, Chennai
- Mumbai University
- Manipur University, Imphal

=== United States ===
==== Missouri ====
- Maryville University, Town and Country
- University of Missouri, Columbia

==== Pennsylvania ====
- Messiah University, Mechanicsburg
- Millersville University of Pennsylvania, Millersville

==== Other states ====
- Marquette University, Milwaukee, Wisconsin
- Marymount University, Arlington, Virginia
- Marshall University, Huntington, West Virginia

=== Asia and Oceania ===
- Mahidol University, Salaya, Thailand
- Mandalay University, Mandalay, Myanmar
- Meiho University, Pingtung, Taiwan
- Misamis University, Ozamiz City, Misamis Occidental, Philippines

=== Europe ===
- Masaryk University, Brno, Czech Republic
- Mondragon University, Mondragon, Spain

=== Africa ===
- Mzumbe University, Mzumbe, Tanzania

=== Elsewhere ===
- Metropolitan University (disambiguation)

== Sports ==
- Manchester United F.C., an English association football club (soccer team), initially named Newton Heath LYR Football Club (1878–1902)
- § Athletes

== Other uses ==
- Musician (United States Navy), an enlisted rating
- Mu, a type of icicle radish
- Mothers' Union, a global Anglican women's organisation

== See also ==
- Moo (disambiguation)
- M (disambiguation)
