= Mukawa =

Mukawa (鵡川) may refer to:

- Mukawa, Hokkaido, a town in Japan
- Mukawa, Kenya, a town in Kenya
- Mu River (Hokkaidō), also called Mu-kawa, a river in Japan
