= MU2 =

MU2 may refer to:

- Mitsubishi MU-2, a Japanese airplane
- Akaflieg München Mü2 Münchner Kindl, a German glider
- Škoda MU-2, a tank, the predecessor to the Škoda MU-4
- MU2, a building at the Ashmole Academy, Barnet, London, England, UK
- MU2 (video game), a 2011 videogame

== See also ==
- Mumu (disambiguation)
- MUU (disambiguation)
- MU (disambiguation)
- MV2 (disambiguation)
