= Muma =

Muma of MUMA may refer to:

== Museums ==
- Ángel María de Rosa Municipal Museum of Art in Junin, Argentina
- Monash University Museum of Art in Melbourne, Australia
- Museum Maluku in Utrecht, the Netherlands
- Museum of modern art André Malraux - MuMa in Le Havre, France
- Musée MuMa, Museum of Mayotte, in Dzaoudzi, Mayotte, France

== People ==
- Fyah Muma, another name for Queen Ifrica, musician
- Muma Gee, singer and actress
- Walter Muma, Canadian moped rider
- Muma, a nickname for Victor Bernardez, Honduran footballer
- Austin "muma" Wilmot, formerly Overwatch League player for the Houston Outlaws
- Chad Muma (born 1999), American football player

== Other ==
- Muma (Celtic goddess)
- Muma River, China

== See also ==
- Moma River in Russia
- Mumu (computer worm)
