= MMV =

MMV may refer to:

== Arts and entertainment ==
- Marvelous Interactive, a Japanese video game developer
- Stormblåst MMV, a 2005 re-recording of Stormblåst by the Norwegian Black metal band, Dimmu Borgir
- MMV, a compilation album by Black metal band Venom

== Military ==
- Maryland Medal for Valor
- Medal of Military Valour, Canada

== Other uses ==
- The year 2005, (Roman numerals: MMV)
- McMinnville Municipal Airport, Oregon, United States (FAA location ID:MMV)
- Maximum majority voting, a voting method that selects a single winner using votes that express preferences
- Maize mosaic virus
- Medicines for Malaria Venture, a not-for-profit public-private partnership
- Melissa Mark-Viverito (born 1969), American politician

== See also ==
- M2V, see M V star
- 2MV
- MVV (disambiguation)
- MV (disambiguation)
- MMU (disambiguation)
