= Yessotoxin =

Names
- Preferred IUPAC name (2S,4aS,5aR,6R,6aS,7aR,8S,10aS,11aR,13aS,14aR,15aS,16aR,18S,19R,20aS,21aR,22aS,23aR,24aS,25aR,26aS,27aR,28aS,29aR)-6-Hydroxy-2-[(2R,3E)-2-hydroxy-5-methylideneocta-3,7-dien-2-yl]-5a,8,10a,11a,19-pentamethyl-3-methylidene-19-[2-(sulfooxy)ethyl]octatriacontahydropyrano[2′′′,3′′′:5′′,6′′]pyrano[2′′,3′′:5′,6′]pyrano[2′,3′:5,6]pyrano[3,2-b]pyrano[2′′′′′,3′′′′′:5′′′′,6′′′′]pyrano[2′′′′,3′′′′:5′′′,6′′′]pyrano[2′′′,3′′′:5′′,6′′]pyrano[2′′,3′′:6′,7′]oxepino[2′,3′:5,6]pyrano[2,3-g]oxocin-18-yl hydrogen sulfate

Identifiers
CAS Number	112514-54-2
3D model (JSmol)	Interactive image
ChEMBL	ChEMBL1269577
ChemSpider	4945067
PubChem CID	6440821
UNII	P6M9FM2L2G
CompTox Dashboard (EPA)	DTXSID20880023
- InChI: InChI=1S/C55H82O21S2/c1-10-11-28(2)12-15-51(5,57)50-30(4)20-39-38(71-50)26-46-55(9,74-39)49(56)48-42(70-46)24-41-47(72-48)29(3)13-16-53(7)44(69-41)27-43-54(8,76-53)17-14-31-32(68-43)21-34-33(65-31)22-35-36(66-34)23-40-37(67-35)25-45(75-78(61,62)63)52(6,73-40)18-19-64-77(58,59)60/h10,12,15,29,31-50,56-57H,1-2,4,11,13-14,16-27H2,3,5-9H3,(H,58,59,60)(H,61,62,63)/b15-12+/t29-,31-,32+,33+,34-,35-,36+,37+,38+,39-,40-,41-,42+,43-,44+,45-,46-,47+,48+,49+,50-,51+,52+,53-,54+,55-/m0/s1 Key: HCYDZFJGUKMTQB-AVHIVUAZSA-N; InChI=1/C55H82O21S2/c1-10-11-28(2)12-15-51(5,57)50-30(4)20-39-38(71-50)26-46-55(9,74-39)49(56)48-42(70-46)24-41-47(72-48)29(3)13-16-53(7)44(69-41)27-43-54(8,76-53)17-14-31-32(68-43)21-34-33(65-31)22-35-36(66-34)23-40-37(67-35)25-45(75-78(61,62)63)52(6,73-40)18-19-64-77(58,59)60/h10,12,15,29,31-50,56-57H,1-2,4,11,13-14,16-27H2,3,5-9H3,(H,58,59,60)(H,61,62,63)/b15-12+/t29-,31-,32+,33+,34-,35-,36+,37+,38+,39-,40-,41-,42+,43-,44+,45-,46-,47+,48+,49+,50-,51+,52+,53-,54+,55-/m0/s1 Key: HCYDZFJGUKMTQB-AVHIVUAZBJ
- SMILES: O=S(=O)(O)O[C@H]4C[C@H]5O[C@H]6C[C@H]7O[C@H]8CC[C@]9(O[C@@]%10(C)CC[C@H](C)[C@H]%11O[C@@H]1[C@H](O[C@H]2C[C@H]3O[C@@H](C(=C)\C[C@@H]3O[C@]2(C)[C@@H]1O)[C@](O)(\C=C\C(=C)C\C=C)C)C[C@@H]%11O[C@@H]%10C[C@@H]9O[C@@H]8C[C@@H]7O[C@@H]6C[C@@H]5O[C@]4(C)CCOS(=O)(=O)O)C

Properties
Chemical formula	C_{55}H_{82}O_{21}S_{2}
Molar mass	1143.36 g·mol^{−1}
- Except where otherwise noted, data are given for materials in their standard state (at 25 °C [77 °F], 100 kPa). Infobox references

Yessotoxins are a group of lipophilic, sulfur bearing polyether toxins that are related to ciguatoxins. They are produced by a variety of dinoflagellates, most notably Lingulodinium polyedrum and Gonyaulax spinifera.

When the environmental conditions encourage the growth of YTX producing dinoflagellates, the toxin(s) bioaccumulate in edible tissues of bivalve molluscs, including mussels, scallops, and clams, thus allowing entry of YTX into the food chain.

== History ==
The first YTX analog discovered, yessotoxin, was initially found in the scallop species Patinopecten yessoensis in the 1960s. Since then, numerous yessotoxin analogs have been isolated from shellfish and marine algae (including 45-hydroxyyessotoxin and carboxyyessotoxin).

Initially, scientists wrongly classified YTXs in the group of diarrhetic shellfish poisoning (DSP) toxins along the lines of okadaic acid and azaspiracids. These types of toxins can cause extreme gastrointestinal upset and accelerate cancer growth. Once scientists realized YTXs did not have the same toxicological mechanism of action as the other toxins (protein phosphatase inhibitors), they were given their own classification.

== Toxicity ==
A large number of studies have been conducted to assess the potential toxicity of YTXs. To date none of these studies has highlighted any toxic effects of YTXs when they are present in humans. They have, however, found YTXs to have toxic effects in mice when the YTX had been administered by an intraperitoneal injection into the animal. The toxicological effects encountered are similar to those seen for paralytic shellfish toxins, and include hepatotoxicity, cardiotoxicity, and neurotoxicity, with a YTX level of 100 μg/kg causing toxic effects. Limited toxic effects have been seen after oral administration of the toxin to animals. The mechanism by which YTX exerts a toxic effect is unknown and is currently being studied by a number of research groups. However, some recent studies suggest the mode of action may have something to do with altering calcium homeostasis. Genotoxicity has been newly reported and confirmed.

Although no data illustrate the direct association of YTXs and toxicity in humans, issues with regards to the potential health risks of YTXs still stand due to the significant animal toxicity observed, and like other algal toxins present within shellfish, YTKs are not destroyed by heating or freezing. As a result, several countries, including New Zealand, Japan, and those in Europe, regulate the levels of YTXs in shellfish. In 2002, the European Commission placed the regulatory level at 1 μg of YTXs per g (1 mg/kg) of shellfish meat intended for human consumption (Directive 20012/225/EC).

Recently, it was shown that yessotoxins can trigger ribotoxic stress.

== Analysis ==
The analysis of YTXs is necessary because of the possible health risks and the limits put in place by the European Commission directive. It is complex due to the large number of YTX analogues that can be present in the sample. Analysis is also problematic because YTXs have similar properties to other lipophilic toxins present in the samples, so methods can be subject to false negative or false positive results due to sample interferences.

Several experimental techniques have been developed to detect YTXs, each offering varying levels of selectivity and sensitivity, whilst having numerous advantages and disadvantages.

=== Extraction methods ===
Prior to analysis, YTXs must be isolated from the sample medium whether this is the digestive gland of a shellfish, a water sample, or a growth-culture medium. This can be achieved by several methods:

==== Liquid–liquid or solvent extraction ====
Liquid–liquid extraction or solvent extraction can be used to isolate YTXs from the sample medium. Methanol is normally the solvent of choice, but other solvents can also be used including acetone and chloroform. The drawback of using the solvent extraction method is the levels of analyte recovery can be poor, so any results obtained from the quantification processes may not be representative of the sample.

==== Solid phase extraction ====
Solid phase extraction also can be used to isolate YTXs from the sample medium. This technique separates the components of a mixture by using their different chemical and physical properties. This method is robust and extremely useful when small sample volumes are being analysed. It is advantageous over solvent extraction, as it concentrates (can give sample enrichment up to the power of 10) and can purify the sample by the removal of salts and nonpolar substances which can interfere with the final analysis. This technique is also beneficial because it gives good levels of YTX recovery — ranging from 40 to 50%.

=== Analytical techniques ===
A range of analytical methods can be used to identify and quantify YTXs.

==== Mouse bioassay ====
The mouse bioassay (MBA) procedure developed by Yasumoto et al. is the official reference method used to analyse for YTX and lipophilic toxins including okadaic acid, dinophysistoxins (DSPs), azaspiracids, and pectenotoxins.

The MBA involves injecting the extracted toxin into a mouse and monitoring the mouse survival rate; the toxicity of the sample can be subsequently deduced and the analyte concentration determined. This calculation is made on the basis that one mouse unit (MU) is the minimum quantity of toxin needed to kill a mouse in 24hours. The MU is set by regulating bodies at 0.05 MU/g of animal.

The original Yasumoto MBA is subject to interferences from paralytic shellfish toxins and free fatty acids in solution, which cause false positive results. Several modifications to the MBA can be made to allow the test to be performed without these errors.

The MBA, however, still has many drawbacks;

- The method is a nonspecific assay- it is unable to differentiate between YTX and other sample components, including DSP toxins
- The method has economic and social issues with regards to testing on animals.
- The results produced are not very reproducible.
- The method has insufficient detection capabilities.

The method, though, is quick and inexpensive. Due to these factors, the other, more recently developed, techniques are being preferred for analysis of YTX.

==== Enzyme-linked immunosorbent assay ====
The enzyme-linked immunosorbent assay (ELISA) technique used for the analysis of YTXs is a recently developed method by Briggs et al. This competitive, indirect immunoassay uses polyclonal antibodies against YTX to determine its concentration in the sample. The assay is commercially available, and is a rapid technique for the analysis of YTXs in shellfish, algal cells, and culture samples.

ELISA has several advantages: it is very sensitive, has a limit of quantification of 75 μg/kg, is relatively cheap, and is easy to carry out. The major disadvantage to this method is it cannot differentiate between the different YTX analogues and takes a long time to generate results.

==== Chromatographic methods ====
A variety of chromatographic methods can be used to analyse YTXs. This includes chromatographic techniques coupled to mass spectrometry and fluorescence detectors. All of the chromatographic techniques require a calibration step prior to sample analysis.

Chromatographic methods with fluorescence detection

Liquid chromatography with fluorescence detection (LC-FLD) provides a selective, relatively cheap, reproducible method for the qualitative and quantitative analysis of YTX for shellfish and algae samples. This method requires an additional sample preparation step after the analyte extraction procedure has been completed (in this case SPE is preferentially used so common interferences can be removed from the sample). This additional step involves the derivatization of the YTXs with a fluorescent dienophile reagent — 4-[2-(3,4-dimethoxy-4-methyl-3-oxo-3,4-dihydroquinoxalinyl)ethyl]-1,2,4-triazoline-3,5-dione, which facilitates analyte detection. This additional sample preparation step can make LC-FLD analysis extremely time-consuming and is a major disadvantage of the technique.

Chromatographic methods coupled to mass spectrometry

This technique is extremely useful for the analysis of multiple toxins. It has numerous advantages over the other techniques used. It is a sensitive and selective analytical method, making it ideal for the analysis of complex samples and those with low analyte concentrations. The method is also beneficial in that it provides important structural information on the analyte which is helpful for aiding analyte identification and when unknown analytes are present in the sample. The technique has benefits over LC-FLD as the derivatisation and purification extraction steps are not necessary. YTX analysis limits of detection of 30 mg/g of shellfish tissue for chromatographic methods coupled to mass spectrometry have been recorded.

The major drawback to LC-MS is that the equipment is very expensive.

==== Capillary electrophoresis ====
Capillary electrophoresis (CE)is emerging as the preferred analytical method for YTX analysis, as it has significant advantages over the other analytical techniques used, including high efficiency, a fast and simple separation procedure, a small sample volume required, and minimal reagent is required.

The techniques used for YTX analysis include: CE with ultraviolet (UV) detection and CE coupled to mass spectrometry (MS). CEUV is a good method for YTX analysis, as its selectivity can easily differentiate between YTXs and DSP toxins. The sensitivity of these techniques can, however, be poor due to the low molar absorptivity of the analytes. The technique gives a limit of detection (LOD) of 0.3 μg/ml and a limit of quantification (LOQ)of 0.9 μg/ml. The sensitivity of conventional CEUV can be improved by using micellar electrokinetic chromatography (MEKC).

CEMS has the added advantage over CEUV of being able to give molecular weight and/or structural information about the analyte. This enables the user to carry out unequivocal confirmations of the analytes present in the sample. The LOD and the LOQ have been calculated as 0.02 μg/ml and 0.08 μg/ml, respectively, again meeting the European Commission directive.

== See also ==
- Canadian Reference Materials

== Sources ==
- J. Aasen; I. A. Samdal; C. O. Miles; E. Dahl; L. R. Briggs; T. Aune (2005). "Yessotoxins in Norwegian blue mussels (Mytilus edulis): Uptake from Protoceratium reticulatum, metabolism and depuration". Toxicon. 45 (3): 265–272. Bibcode:2005Txcn...45..265A. doi:10.1016/j.toxicon.2004.10.012. PMID 15683864.
