= MW2 =

MW2 may refer to:

- Call of Duty: Modern Warfare 2, a 2009 video game
- Call of Duty: Modern Warfare II, a 2022 video game
- MechWarrior 2: 31st Century Combat, a 1995 video game
- Need for Speed: Most Wanted, a 2012 video game, also known as NFS: MW2

== See also ==
- 2MW
- MWW (disambiguation)
- MW (disambiguation)
- "MW-MW", see ISO 3166-2:MW
