= MV2 =

MV2 may refer to:

- Pindad MV2, a light military vehicle
- Vis viva, an early description of kinetic energy using the formula $\sum_{i} m_i v_i^2$

== See also ==
- 2MV, early Soviet unmanned probes to Mars and Venus
- MV (disambiguation)
- MVV (disambiguation)
- MU2 (disambiguation)
