= MVV =

MVV may refer to:

== Groups, organizations, companies ==
- Malaysia Vision Valley (MVV), an economic corridor, see Malaysian National Projects
- Mannheimer Versorgungs- und Verkehrsgesellschaft (MVV GmbH; German: Mannheim Supply and Transport Society), German city works of Mannheim
- Militaire Voetbal Vereniging (M. V. V.), a military soccer team in Suriname, the predecessor of Sportvereniging Nationaal Leger
- Münchner Verkehrs- und Tarifverbund (MVV GmbH; German: Munich Transport and Tariff Association), transit authority of the city of Munich
- MVV Cinema, a film production company founded by M. V. V. Satyanarayana
- MVV Energie, German utility company headquartered in Mannheim
- MVV Maastricht, Dutch football club

== Other uses ==
- Maedi-visna virus (MVV), a Lentivirus that causes illnesses in sheep
- Megève Aerodrome (IATA airport code MVV), airport in south-eastern France
- Tagol language (ISO 639 language code mvv) of Indonesia
- mV/V (millivolts per volt), see parts-per notation
- M. V. Venkatram (M.V.V.; 1920–2000), Tamil writer from India

== See also ==
- MMV (disambiguation)
- MV (disambiguation)
- M2V, see M V star
- MV2 (disambiguation)
- MW (disambiguation)
- MUU (disambiguation)
- MUV (disambiguation)
- MVU (disambiguation)
