= Moo2 =

Moo2 or variation, may refer to:

- Master of Orion II: Battle at Antares (1996 videogame) 4X turn-based strategy game
- Molybdenum dioxide (MoO_{2})

== See also ==
- Moo moo (disambiguation)
- Moo (disambiguation)
