= Monitor unit =

A monitor unit (MU) is a measure of machine output from a clinical accelerator for radiation therapy such as a linear accelerator or an orthovoltage unit. Monitor units are measured by monitor chambers, which are ionization chambers that measure the dose delivered by a beam and are built into the treatment head of radiotherapy linear accelerators.

== Calibration and dose quantities ==
Linear accelerators are calibrated to give a particular absorbed dose under particular conditions, although the definition and measurement configuration may vary among medical clinics.

The most common definitions are:

1. The monitor chamber reads 100 MU when an absorbed dose of 1 gray (100 rads) is delivered to a point at the depth of maximum dose in a water-equivalent phantom whose surface is at the isocenter of the machine (i.e. usually at 100 cm from the source) with a field size at the surface of 10 cm × 10 cm.
2. The monitor chamber reads 100 MU when an absorbed dose of 1 Gy (100 rad) is delivered to a point at a given depth in the phantom with the surface of the phantom positioned so that the specified point is at the isocentre of the machine and the field size is 10 cm × 10 cm at the isocentre.

Some linear accelerators are calibrated using source-to-axis distance (SAD) instead of source-to-surface distance (SSD), and calibration (monitor unit definition) may vary depending on hospital custom.

Early radiotherapy was performed using "constant SSD" treatments, and so the definition of monitor unit was adopted to reflect this calibration geometry.

Modern radiotherapy is performed using isocentric treatment plans, so newer definitions of the monitor unit are based on geometry at the isocenter based on the source-to-axis distance (SAD).

== Secondary monitor unit calculations ==
Nearly 60% of the reported errors involved a lack of an appropriate independent secondary check of the treatment plan or dose calculation

With the development and technological advances, radiotherapy requires that high doses of radiation are delivered to the tumor with increasing precision. According to the recommendations of the International Commission on Radiation Units and Measurements (ICRU) in Publication 24 , the delivered dose should not deviate by more than ± 5% of the prescribed dose. More recently, the new ICRU recommendations in Publication 62

Commercially available computerized treatment planning systems are often used in radiotherapy services to perform monitoring unit (MU) calculations to deliver the prescribed dose to the patient. As only a part of the total dose uncertainty originates from the calculation process in treatment planning, the tolerance for accuracy of planning systems has to be smaller.

Publications on quality assurance in radiotherapy have recommended routine checks of MU calculations through independent manual calculation. This type of verification can also increase confidence in the accuracy of the algorithm and in the data integrity of the beams used, in addition to providing an indication of the limitations of the application of conventional dose calculation algorithms used by planning systems. Table 1 lists MU calculation software manufacturers.

TABLE 1. Commercially available 2nd MU verification software
Manufacturer	Software	Algorithm	Supported	Website
LAP Laser	RadCalc	Modified Clarkson	IMRT VMAT TomoTherapy CyberKnife Halcyon	https://www.lap-laser.com/
Varian Medical Systems	Mobius	Collapsed Cone Convolution/Superposition	IMRT VMAT TomoTherapy CyberKnife Halcyon	https://www.varian.com/
Standard Imaging	IMSure	Three Source Model	IMRT VMAT	https://www.standardimaging.com/
PTW Freiburg	Diamond	Modified Clarkson	IMRT VMAT	https://www.ptwdosimetry.com/en/
Sun Nuclear	DoseCHECK	Collapsed Cone Convolution/Superposition	IMRT VMAT TomoTherapy Halcyon	https://www.sunnuclear.com/
RT Medical Systems	RT Connect	Modified Clarkson	3D, 2D IMRT VMAT TomoTherapy CyberKnife Halcyon	http://rtmedical.com.br/
Math Resolutions LLC	DosimetryCheck	Modified Clarkson	IMRT VMAT	http://www.mathresolutions.com/
MUCheck	Oncology Data Systems	Modified Clarkson	IMRT VMAT TomoTherapy CyberKnife	https://mucheck.com/odshome/
