= Mummu (disambiguation) =

Mummu is a Babylonian deity.

Mummu may also refer to:

- The Justified Ancients of Mummu, a fictional secret society in The Illuminatus! Trilogy by Robert Shea and Robert Anton Wilson

== See also ==
- Munmu of Silla, king of the Korean kingdom of Silla
- Mumu (disambiguation)
