= Church on the Water =

Church in Yufutsu District, Hokkaido, Japan

Coordinates: 43.06374°N 142.62618°E

- 水の教会
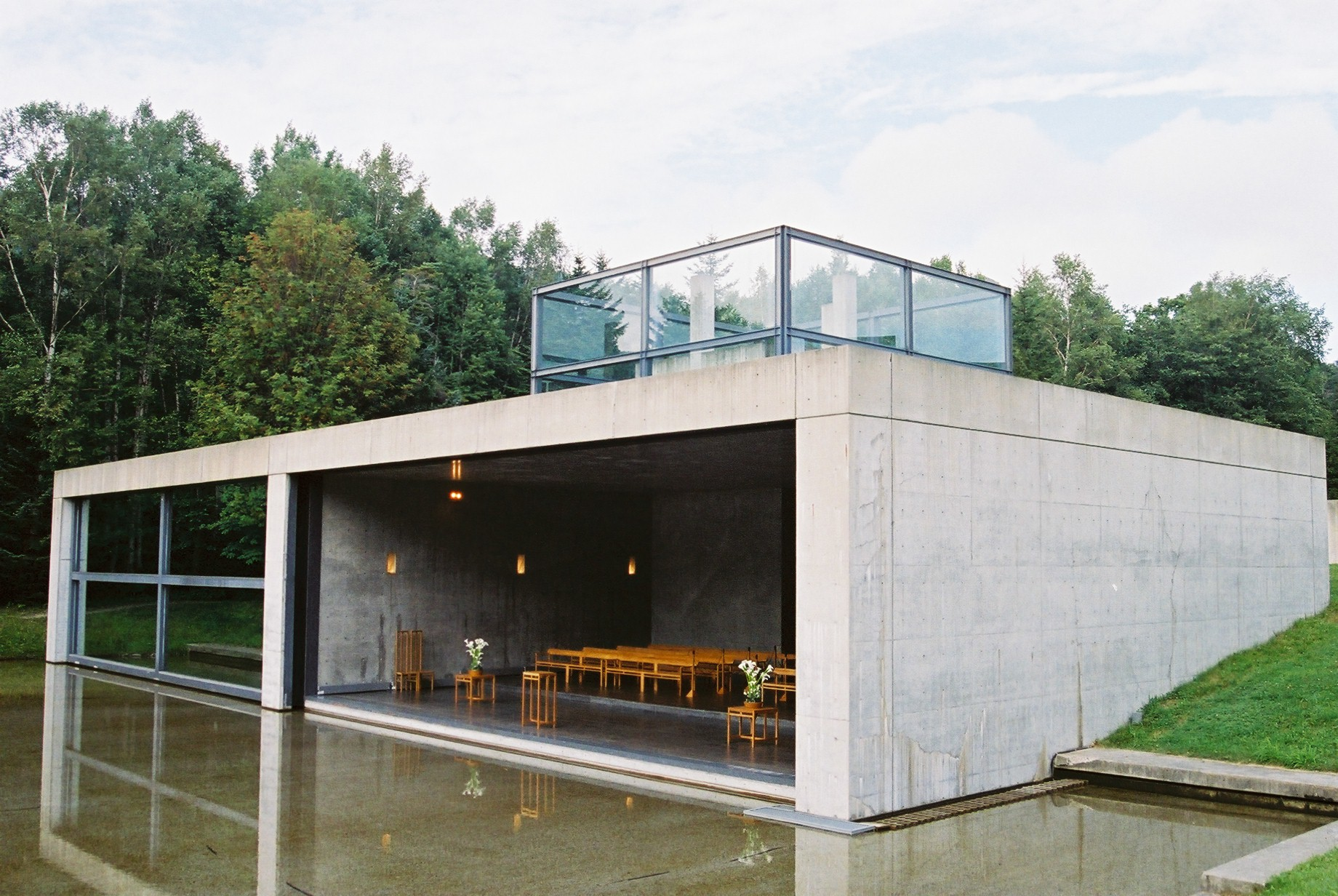
- Church on the Water
- Location: Nakatomamu, Shimukappu, Yufutsu District, Hokkaido Japan

Architecture
- Architect: Tadao Ando
- Style: Minimalist, Modernist
- Completed: 1988

Church on the Water (Japanese: 水の教会) also known as Chapel on the Water is a privately owned wedding chapel in Tomamu, Shimukappu on the island of Hokkaido in Japan. The chapel faces a large reflecting pool visible through a large floor-to-ceiling window in the Japanese architectural tradition of shakkei.

The building is a notable project of Japanese modernist architect Tadao Ando who designed the structure in 1985.

== Gallery ==
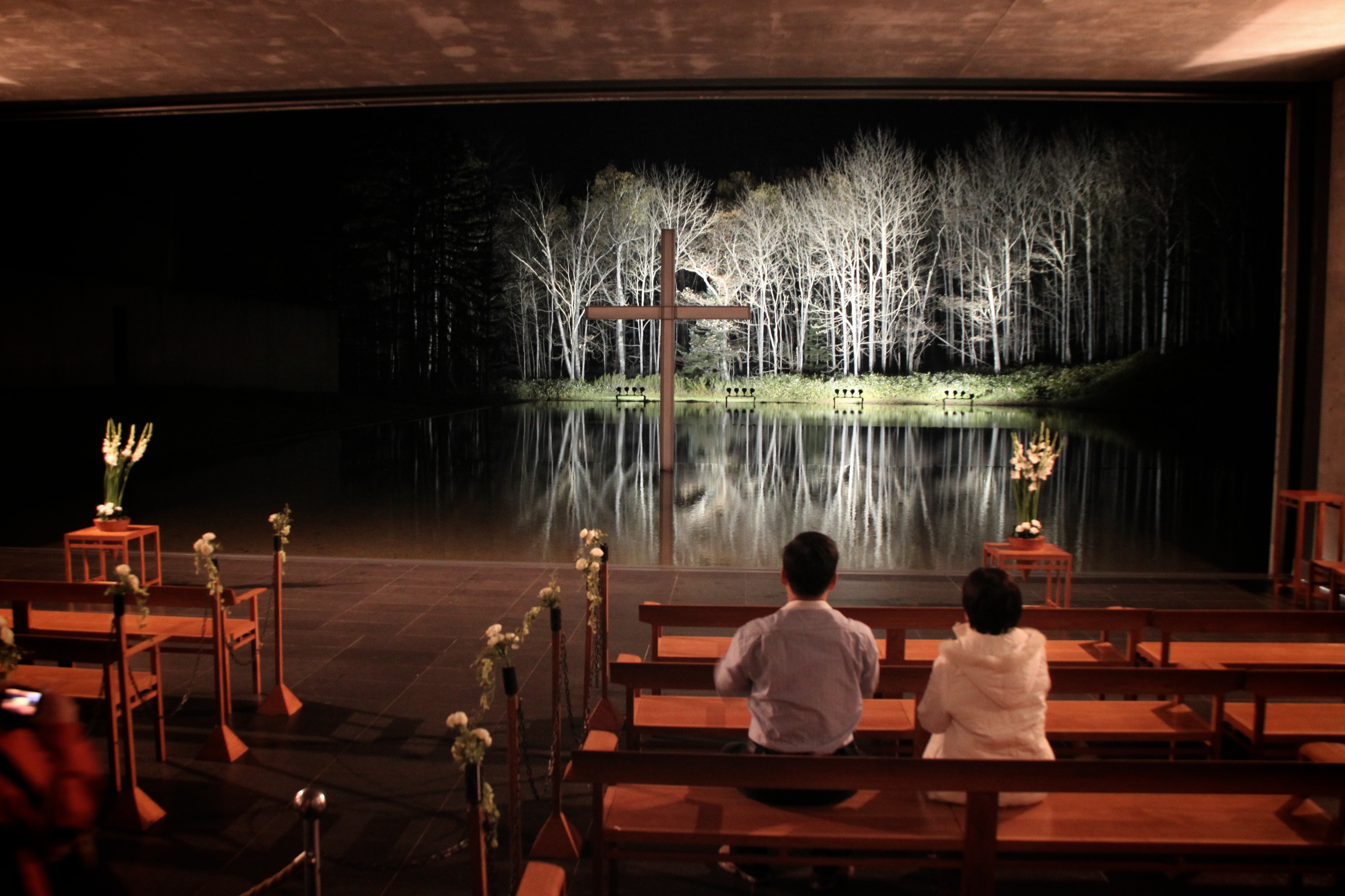

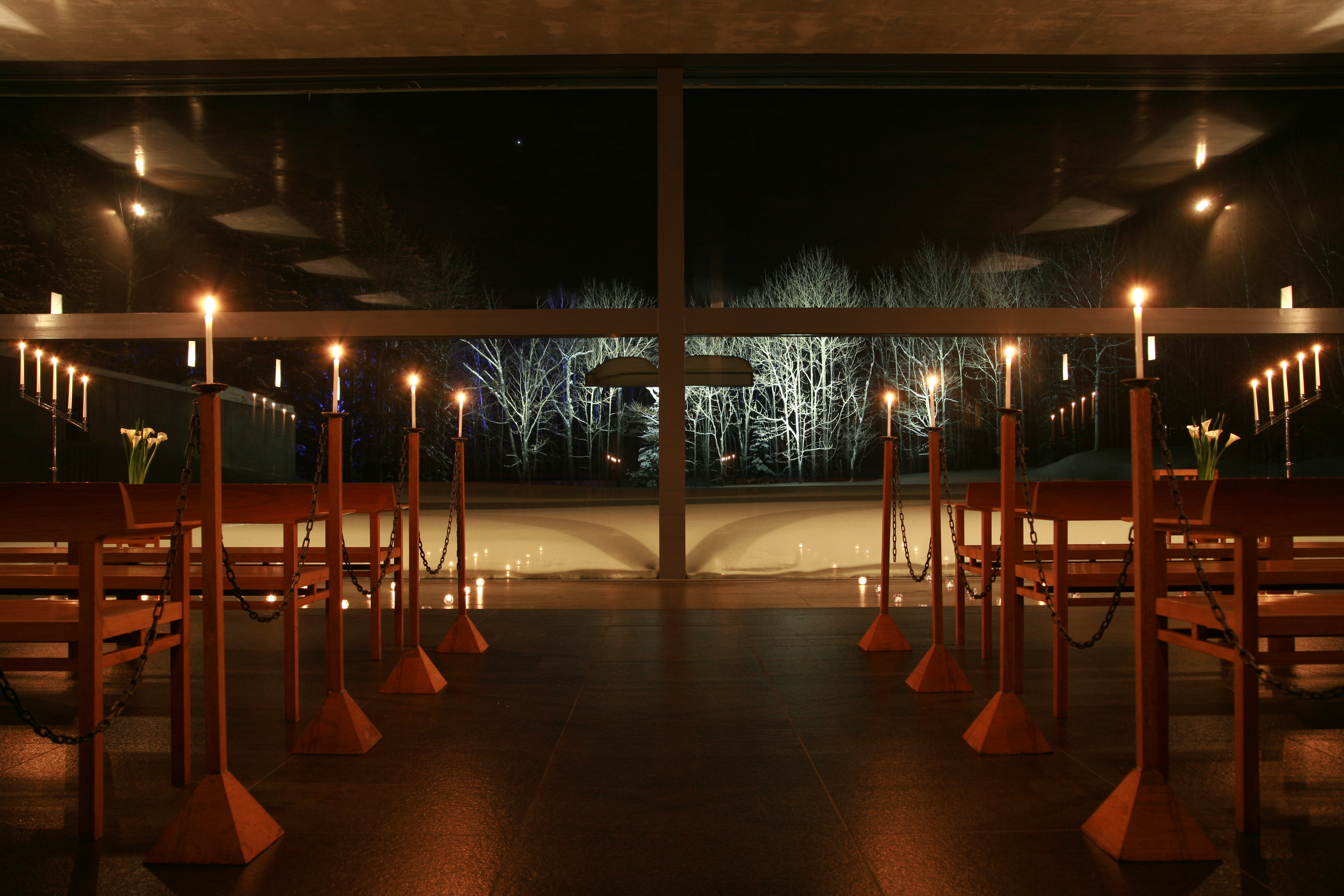

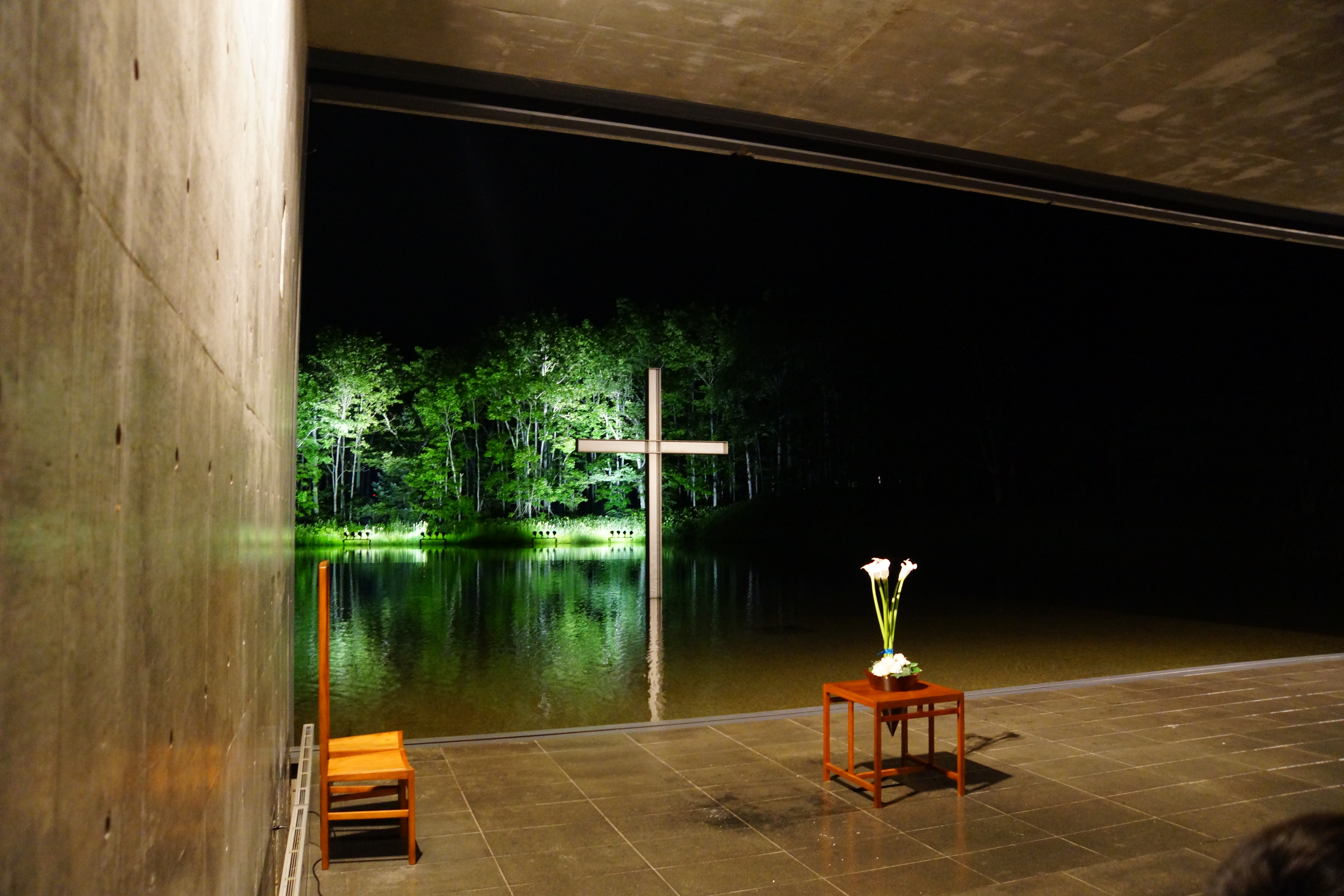

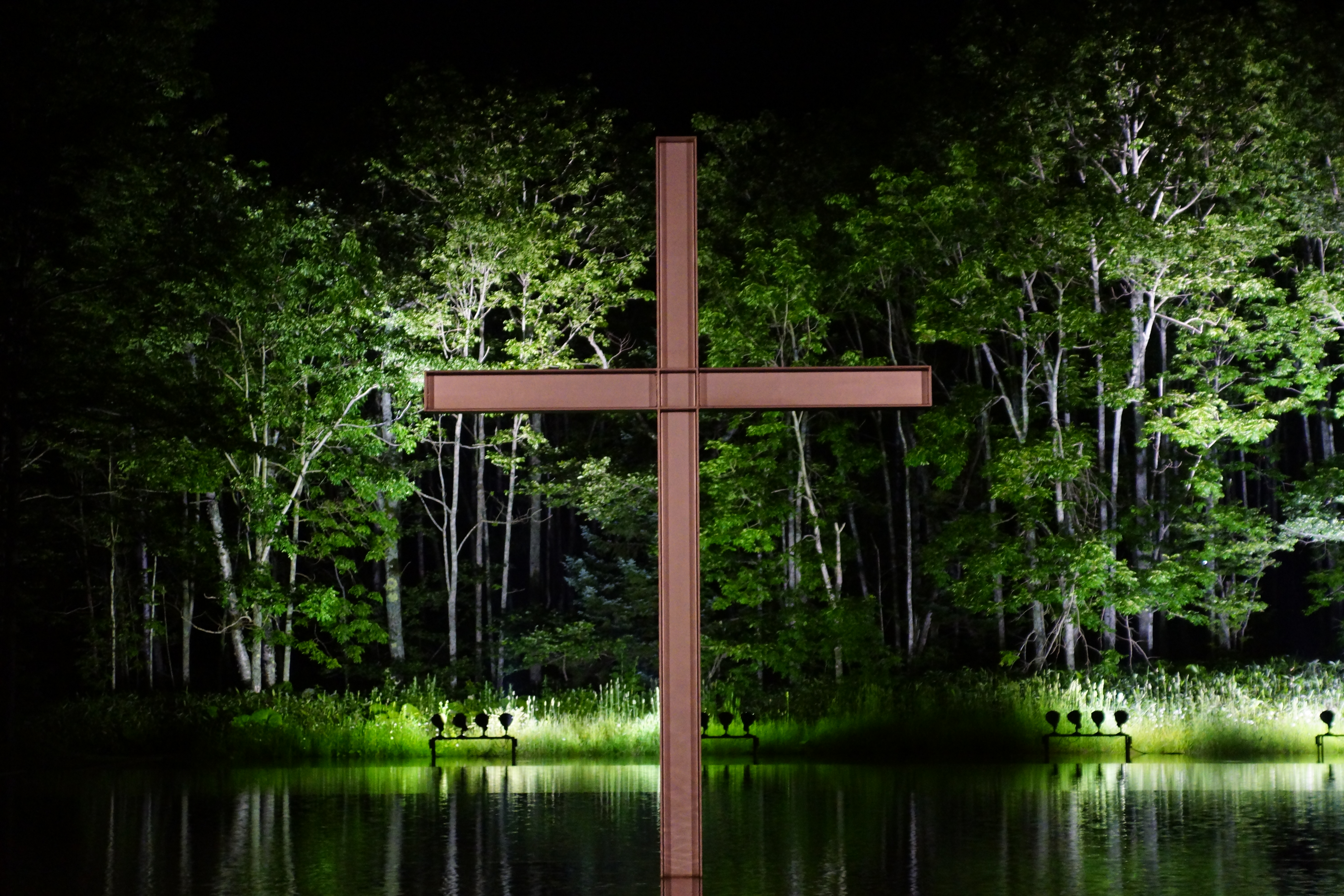
