= Mount Karifuri =

- 狩振岳

Highest point
- Elevation: 1,323.2 m (4,341 ft)
- Prominence: 210 m (690 ft)
- Parent peak: an unnamed peak
- Listing: List of mountains and hills of Japan by height
- Coordinates: 43°1′31″N 142°42′33″E

Geography
- Location: Hokkaidō, Japan
- Parent range: Hidaka Mountains
- Topo map(s): Geographical Survey Institute, 25000:1 上トマム, 50000:1 夕張岳

Geology
- Rock age: Middle Eocene-Early Miocene
- Mountain type: Fold (geology)

Mount Karifuri (狩振岳, Karifuri-dake) is a mountain in the Hidaka Mountains of Hokkaidō, Japan. The mountain sits on the border between Minamifurano and Shimukappu. It is 1,323.2 metres (4,341.2 ft) high. It is the source of the Mu River (Hokkaidō).

Mount Karifuri is split between two different rock types. The western side consists of plutonic rock formed 40–32 million years ago. The eastern side is made of metamorphic rock formed under low-to-mid pressure 50–20 million years ago.
