= Muumuu (disambiguation) =

A muumuu is a type of dress from Hawaii.

Muumuu or variant, may refer to:

- Pocket MuuMuu, a 1999 videogame
- Muumuu House, a U.S. publishing company
- Muumuu, a fictional character from the 2017 film Crash Pad

== See also ==
- Moo moo (disambiguation)
- Mumu (disambiguation)
- MUU (disambiguation)
