= MVU =

MVU may refer to:

== Schools ==
- Missisquoi Valley Union Middle/High School (MVU), Swanton, Vermont, USA

=== Universities ===
- Medium higher education school (VDU, university college; Danish: Mellemlange videregående uddannelser); see University colleges in Denmark
- Marinduque Victorian University, Marinduque, Philippines
- Michigan Virtual University, Michigan, USA
- Moharishi Vedic University, Cambodia; see State institutions of Cambodia

== Other uses ==
- minimum-variance unbiased estimator
- Mobile Ventilation Unit, Seattle Fire Department, Seattle, Washington, USA
- Mobile Veterinary Unit, Millennium Elephant Foundation, Sri Lanka
- Montevideo units (MVU), a measurement of uterine performance in labor
- Marfa language (ISO 639 language code mvu)
- Musgrave Airport (IATA airport code MVU), Musgrave, Queensland, Australia; see List of airports in Australia

== See also ==
- MW (disambiguation)
- MUU (disambiguation)
- MUV (disambiguation)
- MVV (disambiguation)
