= University City =

University City or university city may refer to a town/city specialized in providing higher education where its colleges and universities have a disproportionately large weight on its economic, social and cultural landscape, also known as college town, or a neighborhood within a town/city with the same characteristics. Examples of these include:

== Places ==
=== Americas ===
==== Brazil ====
- Cidade Universitária, a neighborhood in the North Zone of Rio de Janeiro, Brazil, on the artificial island of Fundão Island.

=== Colombia ===
- University City of Bogotá (Ciudad Universitaria), a university in Bogotá, Colombia

=== Mexico ===
- Ciudad Universitaria, the main campus of the National Autonomous University of Mexico

=== United States ===
- University City, Missouri
- University City (Charlotte neighborhood)
- University City, Philadelphia, easternmost region of West Philadelphia
  - Penn Medicine Station, a train station in University City, Philadelphia, formerly named University City station
- University City, Pittsburgh
- University City, San Diego, northwestern portion of the city next to the University of California

=== Other places ===
- University City of Sharjah, an education district in Sharjah, United Arab Emirates
- University City of Madrid, complex in the Moncloa-Aravaca district of Madrid, Spain

== See also ==
- City University (disambiguation)
- Ciudad Universitaria (disambiguation)
- College town
