= Isocentric technique =

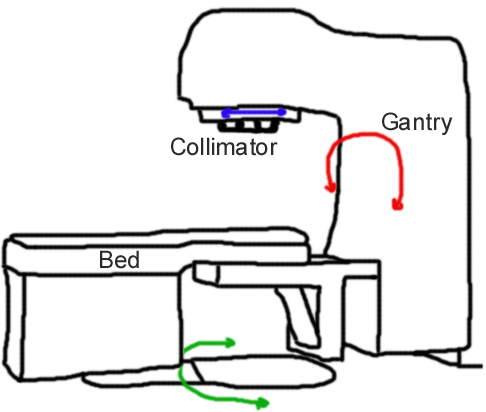
Linac movements: gantry rotation, collimator twist, bed swing.

An isocentric technique is where all beams used in a radiation treatment have a common focus point, a.k.a. the isocenter. Isocentric techniques require less patient repositioning as multiple field arrangements can be delivered with gantry and collimator movements, reducing treatment times.

== Definition ==
The idealized intersection point of the gantry axis of rotation with that of the collimator and treatment table is known as the mechanical isocenter

In practice, due to the heavy weight and mechanical imperfections of the system, the isocenter is not a single point and its location changes with the rotation of the gantry, collimator or couch. This causes small uncertainties in the determination of isocenter position, typically less than 2 millimetres

== Working ==
The movements of the linear particle accelerator (or linac) are threefold:

1. the gantry rotates (like a big crane arm)
2. the collimator twists in the head of the gantry
3. the bed swings around on the floor

All of these movements in the modern linac occur around an axis that runs through the isocenter. In this way, if the centre of the target area in the patient's body is moved to coincide with the isocenter, then all motions of the machine will remain centred on the target. This way, non-target areas will only receive short durations of radiation, reducing damage to them, while the target area receives constant radiation.
