= Ciudad Universitaria =

Ciudad Universitaria may refer to:

== Universities ==
- University City of Buenos Aires, a complex housing two University of Buenos Aires faculties
- University City of Caracas, the main campus of the Central University of Venezuela
- University City of Madrid, a complex that houses Complutense University of Madrid and the Technical University of Madrid
- University City of Mexico, the main campus of the National Autonomous University of Mexico
- University City of the National University of San Marcos, the main campus of the National University of San Marcos, located in Lima

== Places ==
- Ciudad Universitaria (Madrid) barrio, Madrid

== Transport ==
- Ciudad Universitaria railway station, a station in Buenos Aires
- Ciudad Universitaria station (Caracas), a station on the Caracas Metro
- Ciudad Universitaria (Madrid Metro), a station on the Madrid Metro
- Ciudad Universitaria (Mexico City Metrobús), a BRT station in Mexico City

== See also ==
- University City (disambiguation)
- City University (disambiguation)
