= Mobylette =

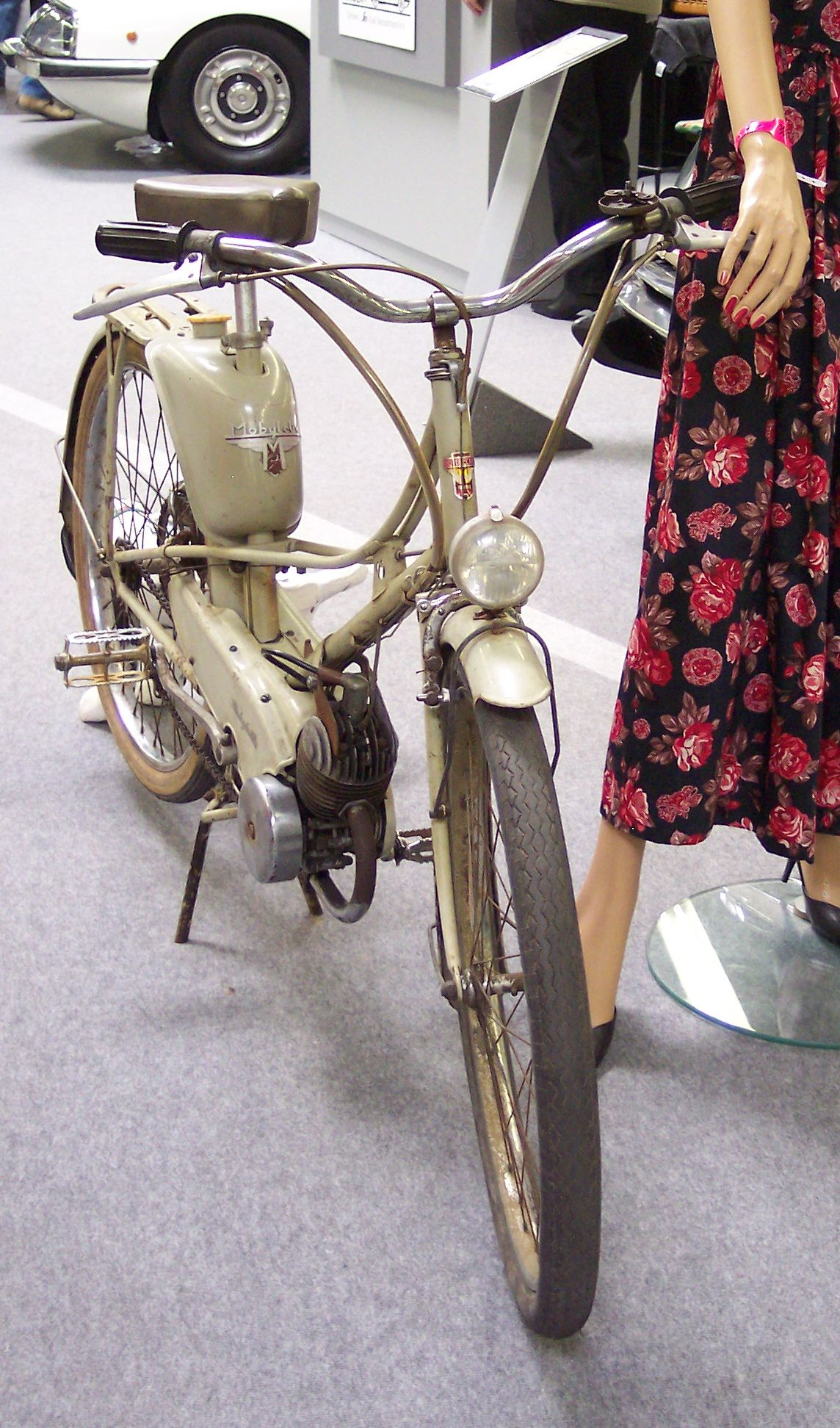
- Manufacturer: Motobécane
- Production: 1949–1997
- Engine: 49 cc (3.0 cu in) air-cooled two-stroke single
- Top speed: 25–40 mph (40–64 km/h), depending on sub-model
- Transmission: Automatic centrifugal clutch and variable dia engine pulley, with swinging engine.
- Dimensions: H: -

The Mobylette, sometimes shortened as Mob, is a model of moped by French manufacturer Motobécane during the second half of the 20th century. The Mobylette was launched in 1949 and was manufactured until 1997, with production numbers exceeding 14 million with peak production in the 1970s, averaging around 750,000 annually. The word Mobylette has since become something of a genericized trademark in the French language, referring to mopeds in general.

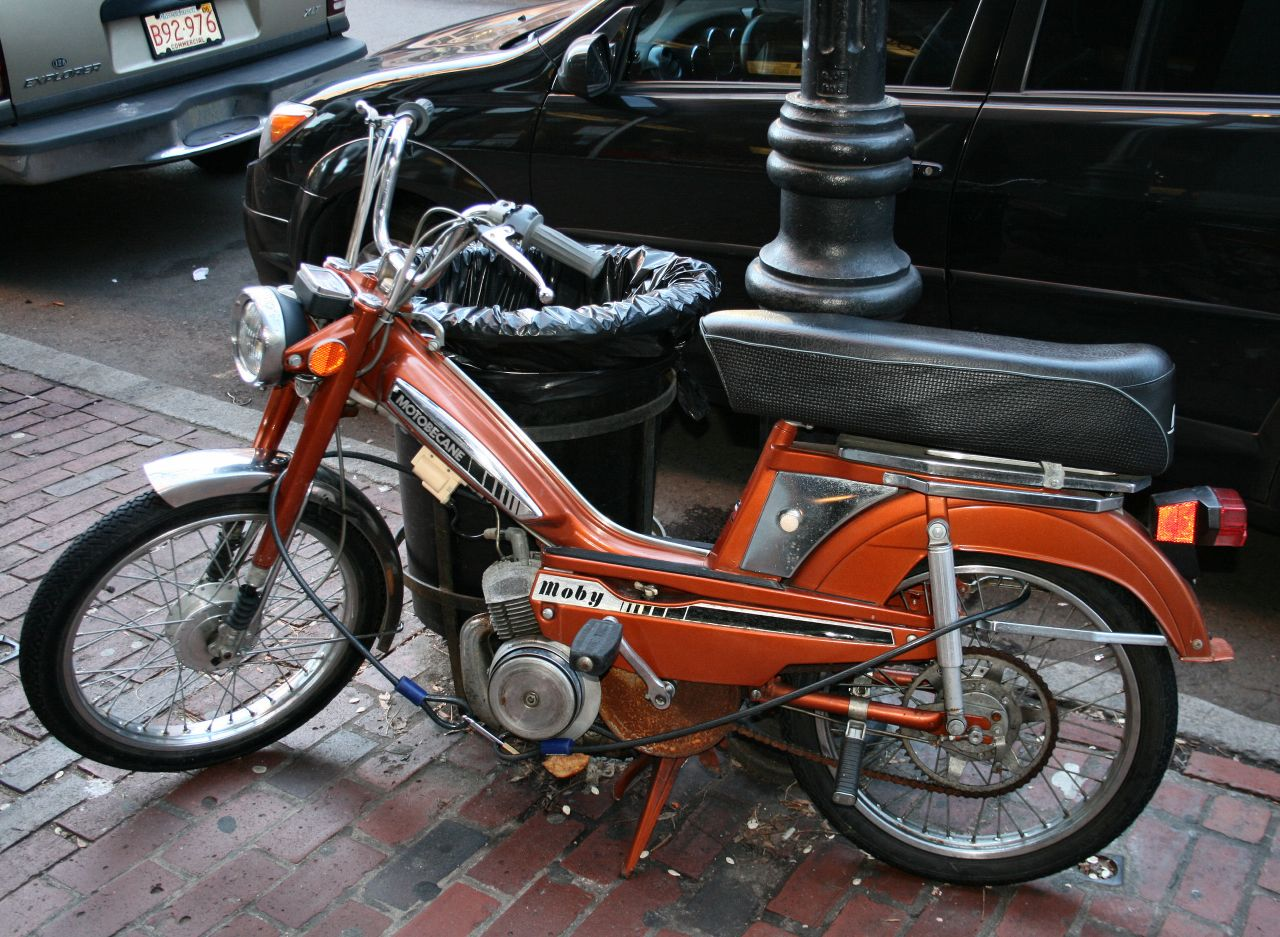
1970s 50V model

All Motobécane mopeds are generally referred to (and usually carry the name) Mobylette, however there are several styles of submodel. Particularly during the moped boom of the 1970s, several variations were available, usually incorporating a number/letter combination such as 40T, 40TL, 40V, and 50V. These naming conventions determined which types of equipment were standard or even available with the moped. For example, the 40T was usually a slower version, capable of just 25 mph maximum speed and having no rear suspension. The top-of-the-line 50V had front and rear suspension, a heavier body, and was capable of 30 to 35 miles per hour (48 to 56 km/h).

In 1978, Canadian Walter Muma rode a 50V 11,500 miles on a 3-month trip that began in Toronto, brought him to Alaska, and back to Toronto.

In India, the earlier version o was manufactured under license by Mopeds India Ltd from 1965 until the late 1980s under the name Suvega. They also had a factory-supported race team which was highly successful in annual Sholavaram races in the 50 cubic centimetres (3.1 cu in) class.

== See also ==
- VéloSoleX
