= MWA =

MWA may refer to:

- Machas with Attitude, Indian hip hop group
- Mandatory Work Activity, UK
- Married Women's Association, UK
- May Week Alternative, a Cambridge University student charity
- Metropolitan Waterfront Alliance, for the NY-NJ waterfront, USA
- Modern Woodmen of America
- Murchison Widefield Array, radio astronomy array, Australia
- Muslim Women's Association, Australia
- Mystery Writers of America
- Modern Written Arabic
- Veterans Airport of Southern Illinois near Marion, US, FAA code MWA

== See also ==
- MW (disambiguation)
