= Mopeds India Limited =

Indian motorcycle manufacturer

- Industry: Automotive
- Founded: 1962, Coimbatore
- Defunct: 1988
- Headquarters: Coimbatore
- Key people: KLV Group, Founders, K.L.Vardarajan, MD
- Products: Suvega
- Number of employees: 500–600

Mopeds India Limited was a two-wheeler manufacturer based in India that produced and marketed the Suvega range of mopeds through technical collaboration with Motobécane of France. Its first model was the Motobécane Mobylette sold under the name Suvega Super 50. It was the first company in India to launch Mopeds in India which was the largest selling two-wheeler segment till 80's and was India's highest-selling moped throughout the early 1980s.

== History ==
The company was incorporated in Coimbatore as Mopeds India Limited by the textile group KLV under K.L.Varadarajan. The manufacturing plant was set up in the early 1960s in Tirupathi. The first model, the Motobécane Mobylette, was designed in 1949 in France and was manufactured in several countries for the next 48 years, selling close to over 14 million mopeds. The company had a racing team as well and between the 1960s and 1980s it won most of the competition under the 50cc class in Sholavaram races. The company was closed in 1988. At one time, it was the largest manufacturer of mopeds in the country. The company operated as a public company.

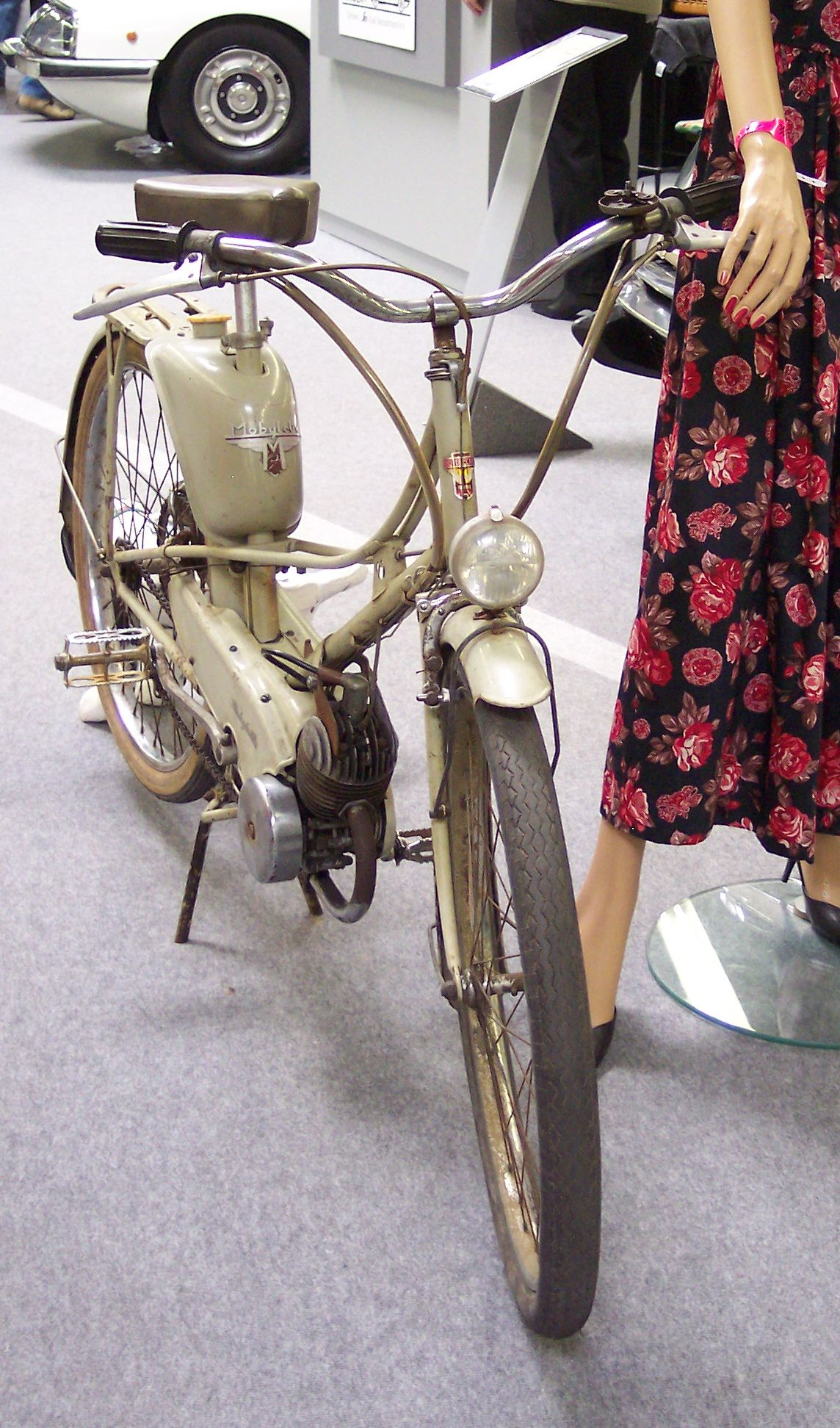
Motobécane Mobylette was manufactured in India as Mopeds India Suvega

== Models ==
The models manufactured by Mopeds India were

- Suvega Super 50 – The original Motobécane Mobylette and the largest selling model.
- Suvega 717 –
- Suvega Samrat – Indianised Moped with a Fuel tank placed like a motorcycle
- Suvega Super Delux –
