= Motobécane =

French manufacturer of bicycles

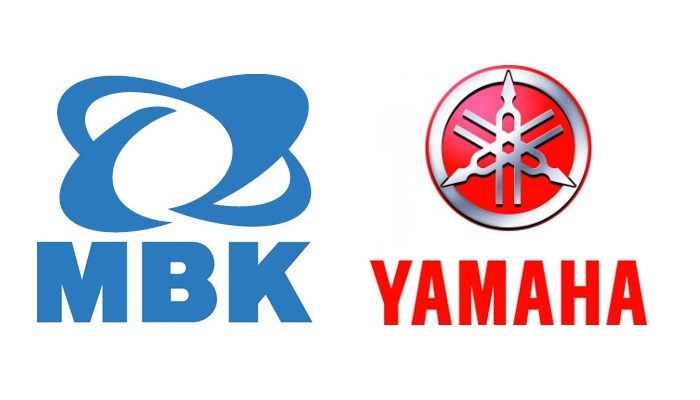
- Type: Private
- Industry: Bicycles, Mopeds, Motorcycles
- Founded: 1923; 103 years ago
- Defunct: 1981
- Headquarters: France
- Products: Bicycle and related components, mopeds and motorcycles
- Parent: Yamaha Motor Company

A Motobécane head badge.

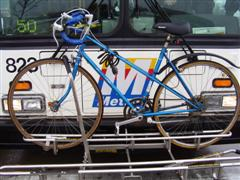
Motobécane Nomade with a mixte frame mounted on the bike rack of a Madison Metro Transit bus.

Motobécane was a French manufacturer of bicycles, mopeds, motorcycles, and other small vehicles, established in 1923. "Motobécane" is a compound of "moto", short for motorcycle; "bécane" is slang for "bike."

Motobécane is a different corporation from Motobecane USA, which imports a wide range of bicycles from Taiwan manufactured by Kinesis Industry Co. Ltd. under the Motobécane trademark.

Luis Ocaña won the Tour de France on a Motobecane branded bike in 1973.

In 1981, the original Motobécane filed for bankruptcy and was purchased by Yamaha and reformed in 1984 as MBK. The French company continues to make motorscooters. They also made fingerbar mowers at least up to 1981.

== Motorcycles ==
For many years Motobecane was France's largest manufacturer of motorcycles. Charles Benoit and Abel Bardin joined in 1922 and designed their first motorcycle in 1923, a 175 cc (10.7 cu in) single cylinder two-stroke-engined bike. By the 1930s Motobecane was producing a best-selling range of motorcycles. In 1933, they produced their first four-stroke machine with 250 cc (15 cu in) capacity. During the 1930s, they manufactured a longitudinal shaft-drive inline-four engine motorcycle in 500 and 750 cc (31 and 46 cu in). During this period, the firm entered road racing competitions and won the Bol d'or endurance race.

After the Second World War they produced the single-cylinder D45 motorbike that filled a need for cheap transportation. The successor was the Z46, equipped with modern suspension. Like many European motorcycle manufacturers, the 1960s proved difficult for Motobécane as cars became affordable. As a result, sales decreased. The arrival of cheap, efficient Japanese motorcycles also hurt sales. They continued to produce two-cylinder 125cc motorcycles throughout the 1970s. They also manufactured a small number of two-stroke, three-cylinder 350cc and 500cc bikes.

For a time in the late 1970s and early 1980s, the company competed in Grand Prix motorcycle racing claiming several victories in the 125cc class and finishing second in the 1980 125cc road racing world championship.

== Bicycles ==
Motobécane was a major manufacturer in the French bicycle industry. Motobecane is known for designing very light weight mountain bicycles. Motobecane was the first French maker to start using Japanese parts, in the late 1970s, with Japanese derailleurs and crank sets performing far above the older French designs common on mid-priced 10-speeds. The change was largely due to the influence of their U.S. importer, Ben Lawee. The frames on Motobécane's mid-to-upper bikes were typically double-butted lugged steel made from Vitus or Reynolds 531 molybdenum/manganese steel tubing with Nervex lugs. Unlike most French makers of the era, Motobecane used Swiss thread bottom brackets for most models. Motobécane finished their frames in beautiful and high-quality paint, a practice not often followed in the French industry. Considered the second most prestigious French bicycle (after Peugeot, whose more durable design they emulated, but ahead of Gitane), Motobécane's mid-range bikes were good value; the company kept prices reasonable by matching high-quality frames with lower-priced, but higher-quality components from Japan, at a time when competitors were putting higher-priced, lower quality French components on mid-range bikes. Motobécane bicycles included the Nomade, Mirage, Super Mirage, Super Touring, Grand Touring, Sprint, Super Sprint, Jubilee Sport, Grand Record, Le Champion, and Team Champion.

In addition to the standard diamond frame bicycles, Motobécane produced mixte frame versions; the mixte frame Grand Touring had twin lateral stays in place of a top tube, extending from the head tube to the seat tube, while the Super Touring and Grand Jubilé had a single top tube sloping down towards the seat tube, but diverging into twin lateral stays just before the seat tube. Later mixte Grand Touring models also used this design. Motobécane also produced a tandem bicycle.

In the early '80s Motobécane launched a new range of bikes under the "Profil" name. These bikes were made from 2040 tubing and this had been "Ovaled" or formed into a tear-drop shape to aid aerodynamics (supposedly one of the first bikes designed in a wind tunnel). They included some hidden cabling through the top tube and full use of Shimano's Adamax 600 ax components which had been designed specifically for aerodynamics.

French bicycles before 1980 often used French-threaded bottom brackets (now difficult to find replacement parts for). French bottom brackets, like Italian ones, used right-hand threading on the fixed cups, making them subject to loosening by precession. Motobécane broke ranks with most other French manufacturers in the mid-70s, using Swiss-threaded bottom brackets (also difficult to find replacement parts for now). Swiss bottom brackets were identical to French, save that the fixed cups were reverse-threaded (like English ones), making them immune to loosening by precession. For more information, see bottom bracket specifications.

In addition, French headsets are sized and threaded slightly differently from the more common English headset.

The name Motobécane is also used for current bikes of Taiwanese manufacture. These vehicles bear no relation to the older French made bicycles, other than the name.

== Mopeds and bike with auxiliary engine ==
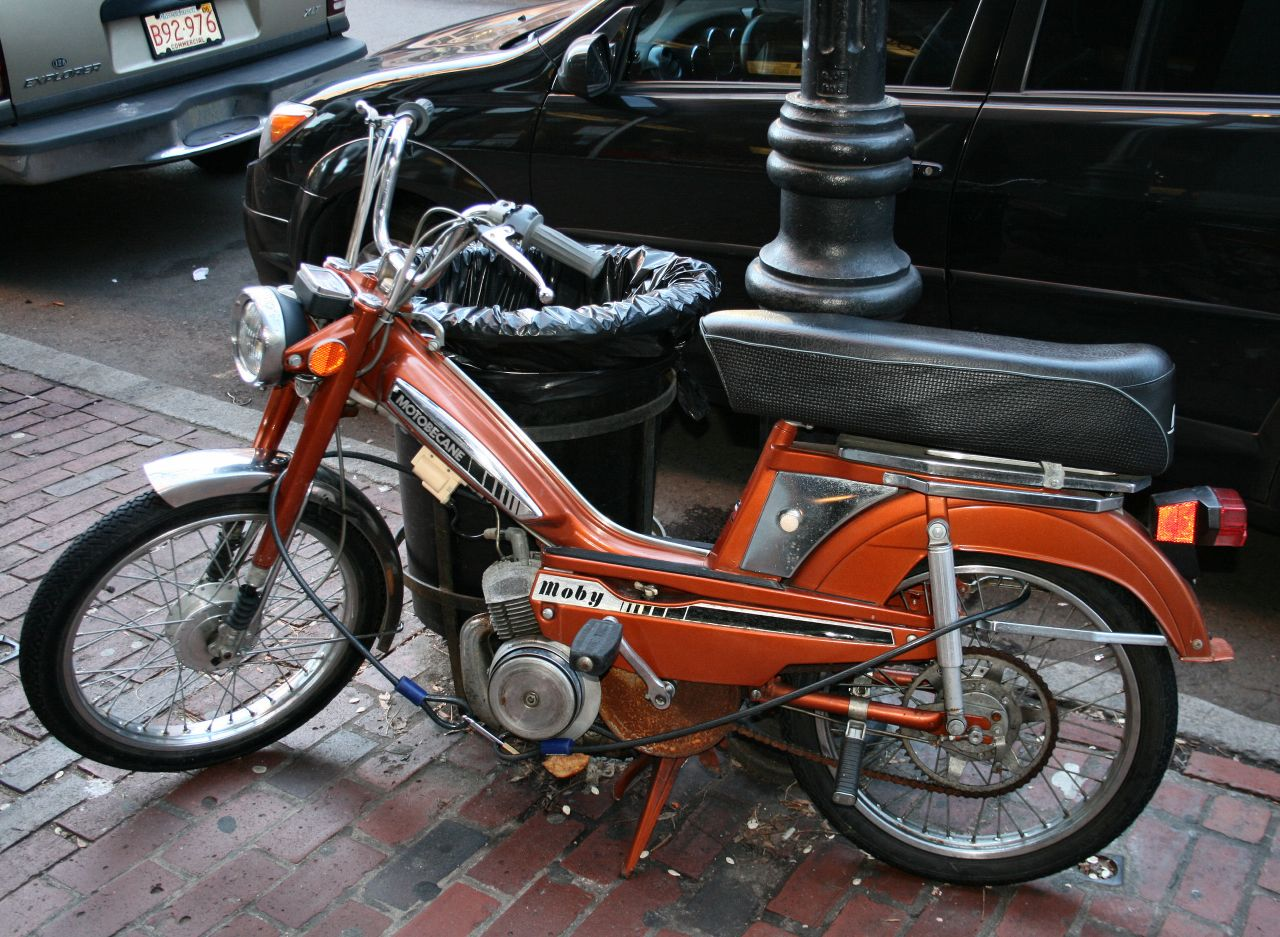
Motobécane Mobylette

Motobécane introduced a moped, the Mobylette, in 1949; over the next 48 years, Motobécane manufactured 14 million Mobylettes. In India the same model was manufactured under licence by Mopeds India Ltd under the name Suvega. In the UK Raleigh manufactured Mobylettes under licence from Motobecane as the "RM" series from 1960 until 1971. In the late 1960s these "Raleigh" mopeds accounted for 38% of UK moped sales. American retailer Montgomery Ward imported Motobecane mopeds and sold them via their catalog under the Riverside captive import brand.

The motorcycles up to the V40 version without shock absorbers. The 'bike with auxiliary engine', had a maximum speed of 25 km/h (16 mph) and were limited to 0.23 kW (0.31 bhp). After this series and from 1961, with the use of Japanese parts and adding rear suspension, the Models V50 and higher were able to reach a speed of 45 km/h (28 mph) hour and with a power of 1.2 kW (1.6 bhp).

In 1978, Canadian Walter Muma rode a 50V 11,500 miles on a 3-month trip that began in Toronto, brought him to Alaska, and back to Toronto.

After being acquired by Yamaha, MBK Industrie continued producing mopeds, becoming a force in French moped racing.

== Cars ==
In 1942, responding to the disappearance of civilian fuel supplies, the directors instructed an engineer called Éric Jaulmes to look into the possibility of producing a two-seater pedal car to compete with the Vélocar. The result was a three-wheel pedal car. Pedal power reached the single rear wheel via a chain and an 8-speed cycle-style gear system. The emphasis was on weight reduction, and the vehicle weighed just over 30 kg, of which approximately 28 kg was accounted for by mechanical components and just 4 kg by the light metal lozenge style body. A single central fin on the tail-piece of the body was featured not for aerodynamic reasons but in order to accommodate the rear wheel.

During the 1950s and 1960s automobile use and ownership in France grew consistently, and much of this growth came at the expense of motorcycle producers. Long lens photographs appearing in L’Auto-Journal in December 1961 showed the results of a serious Motobécane project to fight back by developing a small “quadricycle” format automobile. One of the pictures showed the Motobécane prototype on a boulevard near the company's plant and the Porte de Valette being overtaken by a Renault 4CV: the little Renault looked uncharacteristically large and the Motobecane, positioned between the Renault and a Paris bus, looked barely larger than a child's pedal car. In fact the prototype was 2730 mm long and 1180 mm wide, which was enough to accommodate two people side by side in a fashionably boxy little body: from the side, at first glance, it was hard to tell which end was which: however, the cut-out sections on each side covered with a dark coloured fabric "door" was angled towards the front of the car.

Although the manufacturer was unfamiliar with automobile technology, they were happy to incorporate into the design a form of the innovative infinitely variable transmission which a few years later became a defining feature of DAF cars. Power came from a 125 cc two stroke engine installed at an angle of 7 degrees from the vertical in order to keep the flat front hood/bonnet low enough for the windscreen to be foldable forwards over it in the manner of a traditional Jeep. The prototype's motor-cycle connections were apparent from the large spoked wheels which might not have survived on a production version of the car.

Both a two-seater “KM2” microcar and a “KM2U” microvan were foreseen. In the event, however, neither passed beyond the prototype stage.

== Scooters ==
Under the name MBK Industrie, the company continues to manufacture scooters for the European market.
