= MUV =

MUV may refer to:

== Science and technology ==
- MUV (radiation) (middle ultraviolet), a form of electromagnetic radiation
- Mumps virus (MuV), the virus that causes mumps
- MUV Interactive, the developer of Bird human-wearable interactive devices

== Transportation ==
- Manned underwater vehicle, a synonym for deep-diving crewed submersible
- Military light utility vehicle, a military vehicle classification, also known as a military utility vehicle (MUV)
- Minivan, a passenger vehicle classification, also known as a multi utility vehicle (MUV)
  - Compact MUV, an MUV classification

== See also ==
- Muv-Luv, a 2003 Japanese erotic visual novel
- Move (disambiguation)
- MW (disambiguation)
- MUU (disambiguation)
- MVU (disambiguation)
- MVV (disambiguation)
