= City college =

City college may refer to:

== In the United States ==
- Community college, a type of educational institution sometimes called a junior college or a city college in the United States
- City College of New York
  - 137th Street – City College (IRT Broadway – Seventh Avenue Line)
- Baltimore City College
- Berkeley City College
- City College (Florida)
- City Colleges of Chicago
- City College of San Francisco
- Fresno City College
- Long Beach City College
- Los Angeles City College
- Pasadena City College
- Sacramento City College
  - City College station (Sacramento), the light rail station serving Sacramento City College
- San Diego City College
  - City College station
- San Jose City College
- Santa Barbara City College

== In the United Kingdom ==
- City College Brighton and Hove
- City College, Birmingham
- City College Coventry
- City College Manchester
- City College Norwich
- City College Plymouth
- City, University of London, a college of the University of London
- Southampton City College

== In Bangladesh ==
- Government M. M. City College, Khulna
- Government City College, Chattogram
- Dhaka City College

== In Canada ==
- La Cité collégiale
- Vancouver Community College, formerly Vancouver City College

== In India ==
- City College Hyderabad
- City College, Kolkata

== See also ==
- City University (disambiguation)
