= MWW =

MWW may refer to:

- The Mann-Whitney-Wilcoxon test for statistical significance
- Marquis Who's Who, a publisher of directories with short biographies of influential persons
- The White Hmong language (SIL code MWW)
- Milky Way Wishes, a subgame in the video game Kirby Super Star
- Missing white woman, or "Married White Woman"
- Moment magnitude scale for earthquakes
- Monster Worldwide, a website operating company (NYSE ticker symbol MWW)
- .MWW, a file format for Music Works, a music software program
- MWW (company), a public relations firm
- Myanmar Wide Web, a tongue-in-cheek reference to restricted Internet in Burma

== See also ==
- MW2 (disambiguation)
