= Mumu =

Mumu may refer to:

- Mumu, a pork dish in Papua New Guinean cuisine, can also refer to the cooking method or the feast at which the dish is eaten
- Muumuu, a loose dress of Hawaiian origin
- Mumu, a nickname of Hindi film actress Mumtaz
- "Mumu" (short story), a short story by Ivan Turgenev published in 1854
- Mumu (1959 film), a Soviet drama film
- Mumu (2010 film), a French film
- Mumu, a Chinese film, released in 2025, AKA "Bu shuo hua de ai"
- Mumu (computer worm) (or Muma), isolated in 2003
- Mumu (or momo), a ghost or monster in Philippine mythology
- The UK band The KLF were previously known as The Justified Ancients of Mu Mu
- Moo-Moo, a chain of buffet restaurants in Moscow, Russia
- Mumu or Muma is the Old Irish for the province of Munster
- 'Mumu' is a commonly used Nigerian Pidgin term for 'fool', used as an insult

== See also ==
- Mu (disambiguation)
- Mum (disambiguation)
- Muumuu (disambiguation)
- Moo moo (disambiguation)
