= City University =

City University may refer to:

- City University of Hong Kong, China
- City University Malaysia, Malaysia
- City St George's, University of London, United Kingdom
- City University of New York, United States
- City University of Seattle, United States
- City University of Macau, China
- City University, Bangladesh
- City University of Istanbul, Turkey

Other city universities:

- Birmingham City University, United Kingdom
- Dublin City University, Ireland
- Kansas City University, United States
- Oakland City University, United States
- Oklahoma City University, United States
- Nagoya City University, Japan
- Osaka City University, Japan
- University of the City of Manila, Philippines
- Yokohama City University, Japan

== See also ==
- City College (disambiguation)
- Ciudad Universitaria (disambiguation)
- College town
- University City (disambiguation)
- Metropolitan University (disambiguation)
