= Mukawa, Kenya =

Town in Samburu County, Rift Valley Province, Kenya

Mukawa
- Interactive map of Mukawa
- Coordinates: 1.200°N 36.667°E
- Country: Kenya
- Province: Rift Valley Province
- County: Samburu County

Mukawa is a town in the Samburu County, of Kenya. Mukawa has a population around 16,281. Mukawa is in the Rift Valley Province. Mukawa is 360 km west of Nairobi. Mukawa has an elevation of 2232 meters (2.232 km).
