= Walter Muma =

Canadian moped rider

- Born: August 5, 1956 (age 69); Toronto, Ontario, Canada
- Website: mopedtrip.com

Walter Muma (born 5 August 1956) is a Canadian man who is on record for completing a 3-month 11,500-mile (18,660 km) journey across Canada and Alaska by moped. The journey took place during the summer of 1978, began in Toronto, passed through Yukon and Alaska, continued up the Dempster Highway to Inuvik, Northwest Territories, and finally back to Toronto.

== Early life ==
Muma was born in Toronto, Ontario, Canada to Robert and Dorothy Muma. His father was a bookbinder and restorer of books; both his parents affiliated religiously as Quakers. He has one sister.

He attended Jesse Ketchum Public School and Northern Secondary School. Three days after graduating high school in 1974, he set out on an 800-mile bike ride to northern Ontario. He also hitchhiked his way out to British Columbia, Yukon, Alaska and Nova Scotia, returning to Toronto after four and a half months on the road.

Muma bought his first moped in 1975. That year, he toured most of Ontario and parts of the United States. In summer 1977, he rode to Newfoundland and parts of Quebec.

== Record-breaking trip ==
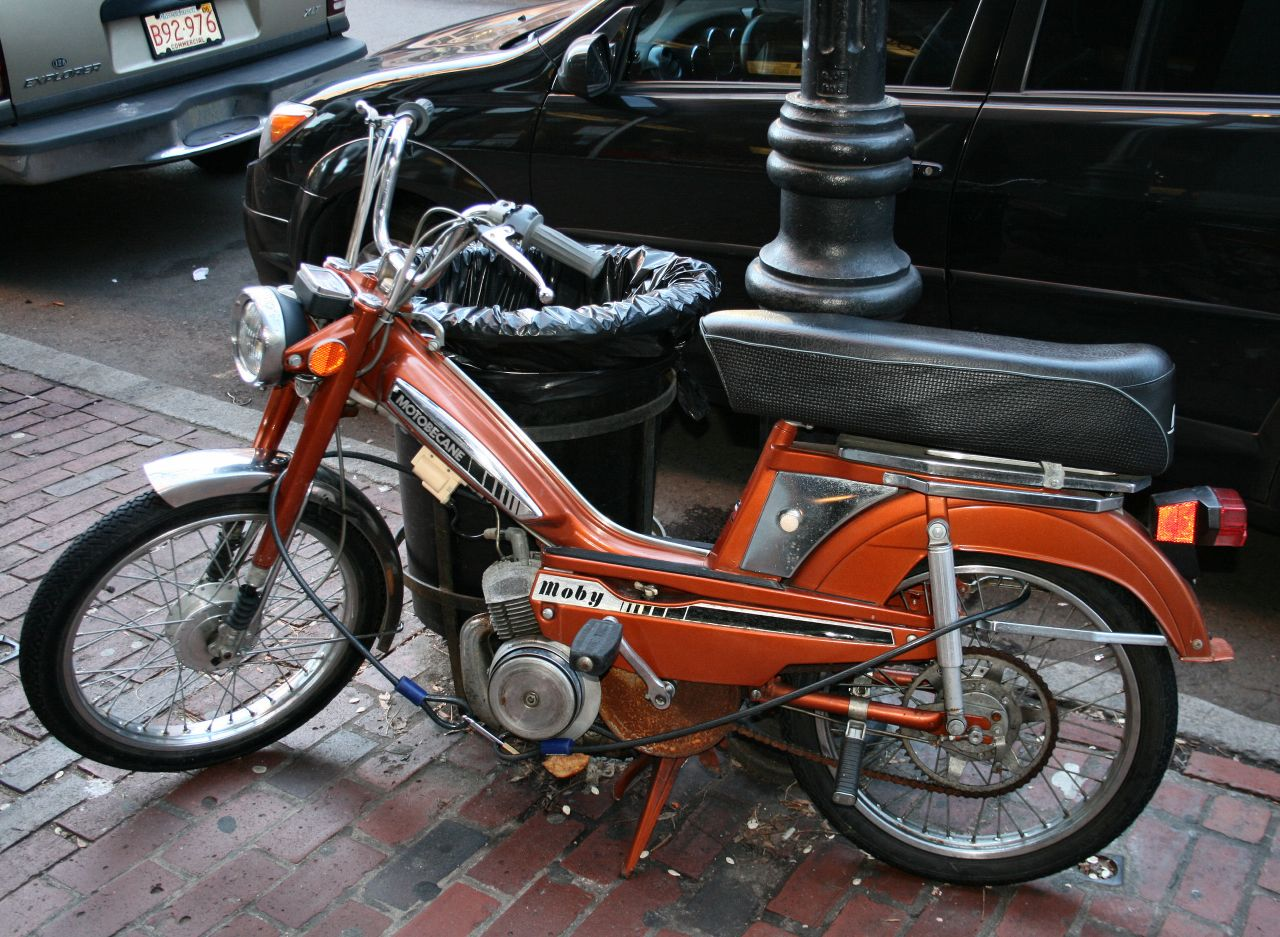
1970s 50V model, the same model Muma rode

For his 3-month trip in 1978, Muma purchased a French made, Yellow 1978 Motobécane Mobylette 50v, which was equipped with a 49cc, 2.5 horsepower, two-stroke engine. This model was Motobecane's top-of-the-line moped offering at the time. It was capable of about 25-30 mph top-speed on even roadway and averaged 150 miles per gallon.

Muma disassembled an older Motobecane for spare parts to bring on his trip. He also brought approximately 50 pounds of gear, including a tent, sleeping bag, clothing, tools, food and water, spare fuel cans, and oil to mix with the fuel.

=== Reasons ===
During the 1970s, Alaska and the northern portions of Canada were changing significantly as a result of the large mineral and oil deposits located there. Companies were moving in to mine and drill, and as a result, many roads were being paved and certain areas were being cleared. As Muma stated in news articles that covered his trip, "I want to see more of the north land, because it's changing so rapidly....I want to get there before the changes."

He had also developed an interest in photography previous to his trip. Throughout the three-month journey, he took a number of photographs of mountains, streams, his campgrounds, and a variety of other natural settings.

== Trip itinerary ==
=== Toronto to Dawson Creek ===
Muma began his trip on June 3, 1978, leaving his home in Toronto. He rode to the Chapleau Route of the Trans-Canada Highway, and continued North on the highway, curving west to Wawa. The Chapleau Route itself is a desolate stretch, extending 215 miles from Thessalon to Wawa. No other towns exist between these two, however the road passes along the Mississagi River and near Aubrey Falls.

After passing Wawa, Muma continued along the main Trans-Canada Highway route, along the edge of Lake Superior. A few miles off the highway, east of Thunder Bay, he visited the Ouimet Canyon, and later, near the western edge of Lake Superior, Kakabeka Falls.

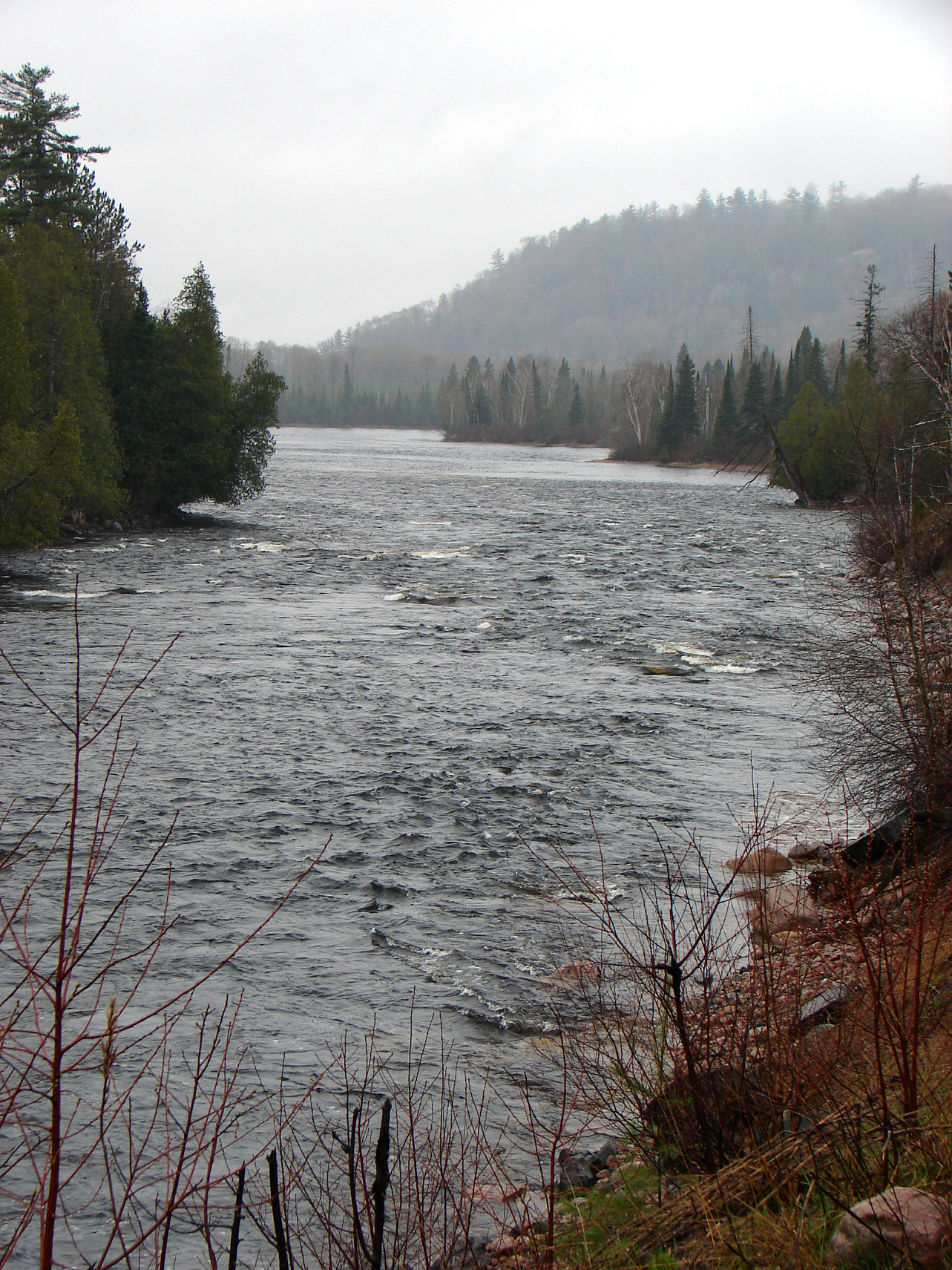
Mississagi River

On June 12, Muma crossed into Manitoba, crossing the Red River. Two days later, he crossed into Saskatchewan, passing Regina, and on June 18, he crossed into Alberta. Most of the terrain, thus far, had proved to be relatively easy to traverse on the moped, as it is primarily flatland prairie, however he did have some difficulty with a few dirt roads. Three weeks after beginning his journey, he reached the border of British Columbia and Dawson Creek.

=== Alaska Highway ===
Dawson Creek marks the beginning of the Alaska Highway. In 1979, only the first 90 miles of this highway were paved, with the remainder, until reaching the Alaska border, laid as gravel. At the time it was fairly remote- however, some years later, it was paved over in its entirety.

After heading out of Dawson Creek, Muma crossed over the Kiskatinaw River, and then shortly thereafter the Peace River. Near the 93 mile marker, he reached the end of the paved roadway and continued on the gravel portion, passing gas wells and the Sikanni Chief River valley.

After 186 miles, the highway actually passes over Trutch Mountain. Minaker River passes nearby. Further travel, after 300 miles had passed, brought him to Steamboat Mountain near the Muskwa River, Indian Head Mountain and eventually travelled alongside the Tetsa River. By mile 384, although it was June 26, Muma encountered a large patch of snow next to the roadway left over from the previous winter. By this point, the terrain was becoming increasingly mountainous, as Muma continued through the Rocky Mountains, passing Summit Lake and McDonald River Gorge.

Near mile 401, Muma took a short side trip on a partially washed-out road to the abandoned Churchill Mines. Although the road was washed out, he was able to traverse it on the moped, later encountering increasingly rugged scenery and an abandoned cabin, before he finally reached one of the mines, where he camped for the night. In the morning, he photographed a nearby herd of mountain sheep.

After passing the mines, he resumed traveling the Alaska Highway, passing McDonald River and Toad River. He camped at Muncho Lake, photographing more mountain sheep. Near mile 504, the road follows the Liard River for some time, eventually winding up in Watson Lake, Yukon.

=== Yukon and Alaska ===
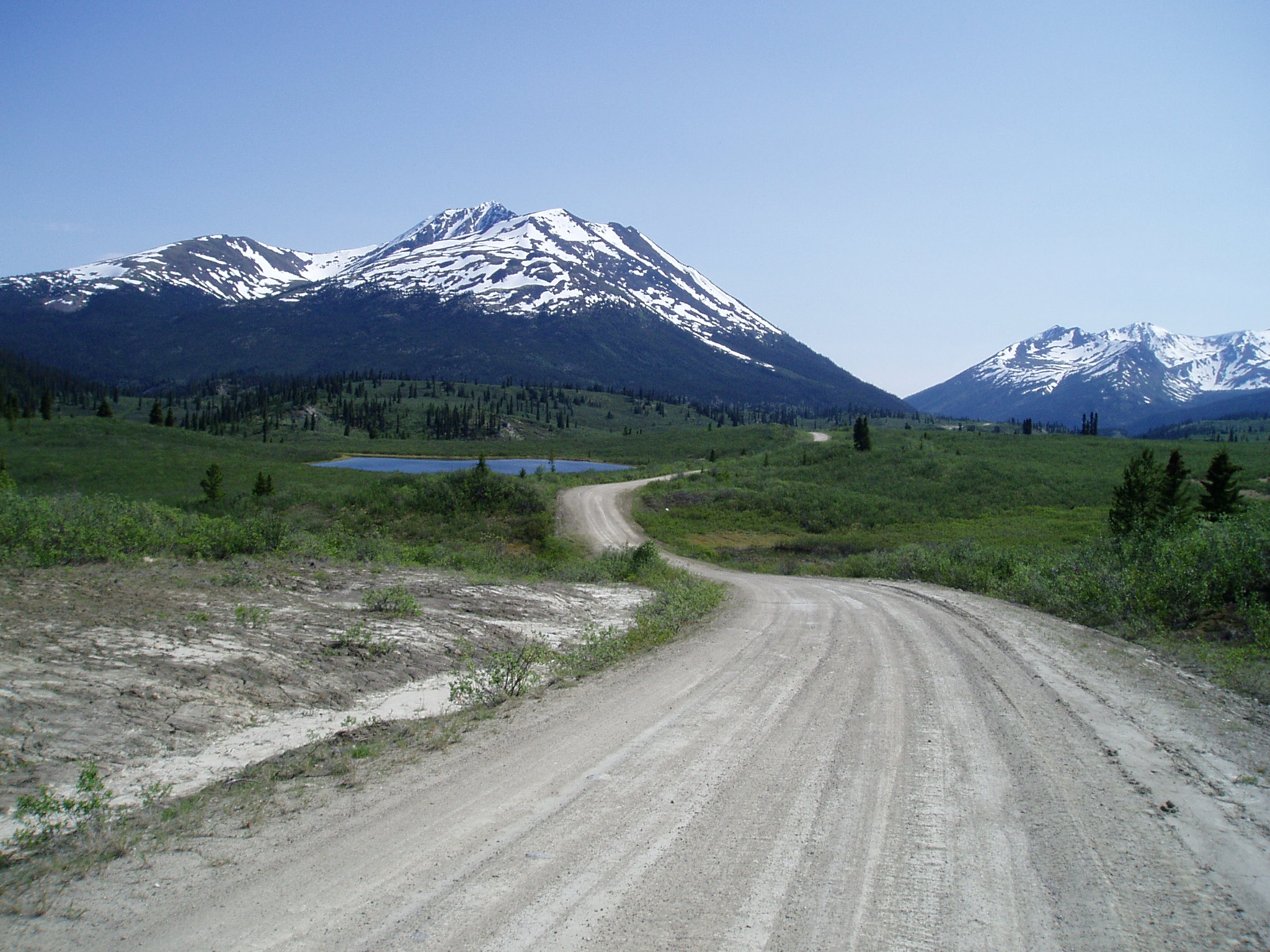
South Canol Road near the headwaters of the Rose River

Muma spent some time wandering on side roads throughout the Yukon and Alaska. From Watson Lake, he headed North up the Robert Campbell Highway. A side trip included up the Nahanni Range Road and back. Continuing on the Robert Campbell Highway, he passed the Finlayson River and eventually wound up at the Pelly River, near the town of Ross River. He then followed the Canol Road, to Quiet Lake, and then back to the Alaska Highway. He took a side trip to Atlin, British Columbia (which was then only accessible from Yukon), passing the ghost town of O'Donnell. Other wide trips included to Carcross, Haines, Alaska, the Taylor Highway, to Eagle, Alaska, eventually resuming his trip on the Alaska Highway to Dawson City. Further side trips included to Inuvik, Northwest Territories and back South to Whitehorse. Please expand on this side trip to Inuvik. How did you cross the Peel and Arctic Red Rivers as there were no ferries in 1978.

=== British Columbia ===
Muma left Whitehorse and proceeded on the Stewart-Cassiar Highway to British Columbia. He passed by Cassiar, a company town then owned by an asbestos mining company. He traveled past the Coast Mountains and the Ningunsaw River, reaching the Bear Glacier, which at the time reached nearly to the road itself (due to climate change, the glacier has melted and retreated considerably as of 2004). From here, he traveled to Stewart, and then back towards Ontario.

=== Back to Ontario ===
Next, Muma followed the Yellowhead Highway, passing Hudson Bay Mountain and the Fraser River. He continued through Alberta, Saskatchewan and Manitoba, eventually reaching the border of Ontario. By this point, his moped, which had been brand new when starting out, was now very dirty and completely loaded down with equipment.

His total trip took approximately three months, covered 11,500 miles and ended back in Toronto on September 7, 1978.

== After the trip ==
Muma continued to tour, backpack, hike and canoe in Canada and the United States after his record-breaking moped trip. He also visited Australia for two weeks and India for six months. Eventually, he found employment in the Canadian post office and as a driving instructor in Toronto. He took a course in accounting and finance at Seneca College and worked as an accountant in a small firm for eight years. In recent years, he has run his own computer consulting business. He is also an experienced field botanist (and gives lectures on the subject) and a photographer.
