= Mu River (Hokkaidō) =

River in Hokkaidō, Japan

Mu River 鵡川
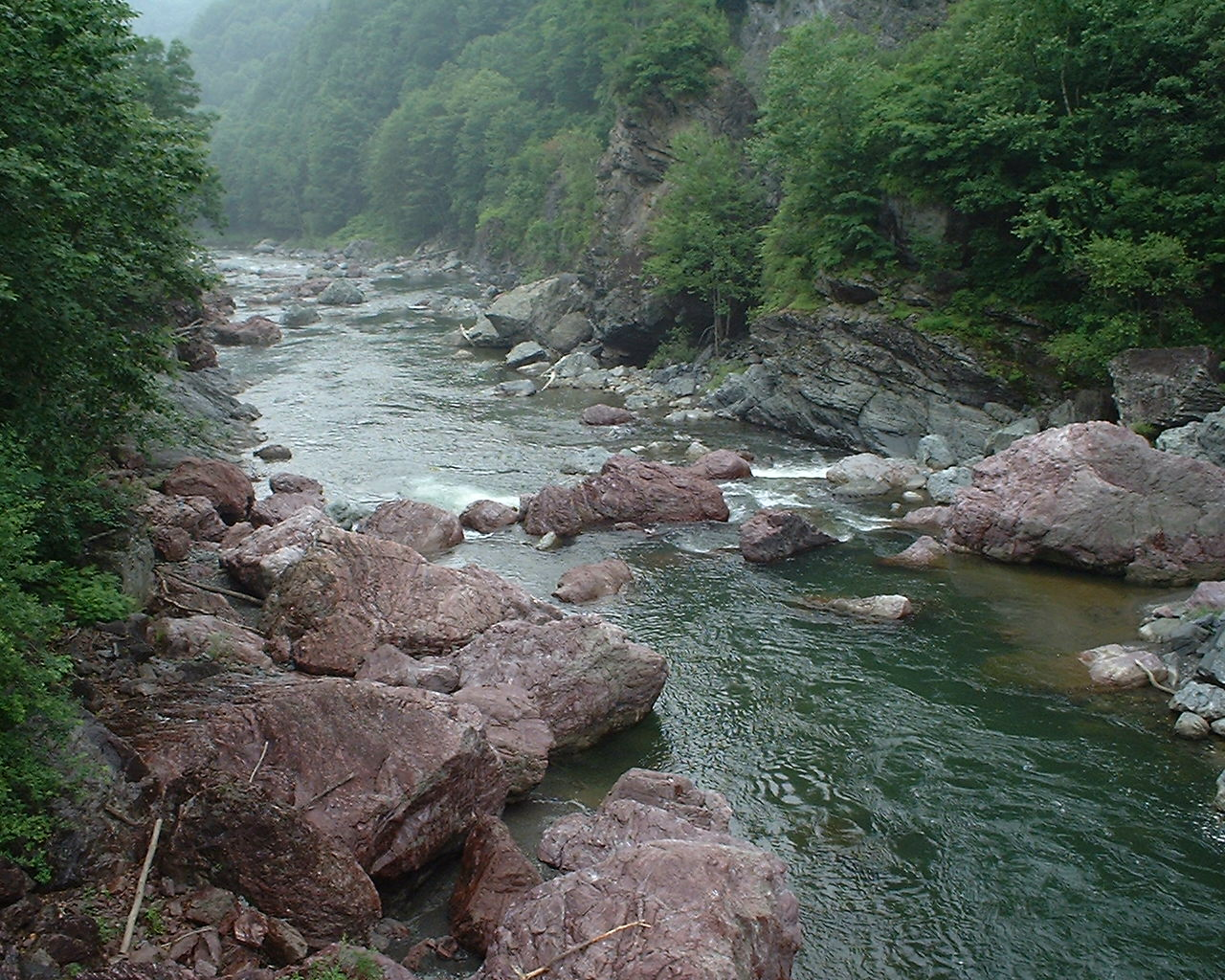
- Red and Blue Boulder Gorge (赤岩青巌峡, Aka-iwa-sei-gan-kyō) in Shimukappu (July 2000)

- Location within Japan
- Native name: Mu-kawa (Japanese)

Location
- Country: Japan
- State: Hokkaido
- Region: Iburi, Kamikawa
- District: Yūfutsu
- Municipalities: Mukawa, Shimukappu

Physical characteristics
- Source: Mount Karifuri
  - location: Shimukappu, Hokkaido, Japan
  - coordinates: 43°1′41″N 142°41′4″E
  - elevation: 740 m (2,430 ft)
- Mouth: Pacific Ocean
  - location: Mukawa, Hokkaido, Japan
  - coordinates: 42°33′45″N 141°55′1″E
  - elevation: 0 m (0 ft)
- Length: 135 km (84 mi)
- Basin size: 1,270 km^{2} (490 sq mi)
- Discharge
  - average: 50.44 m^{3}/s (1,781 cu ft/s)

Mu River (鵡川, Mu-kawa) is a river in Hokkaido, Japan. Located in Kamikawa and Iburi subprefectures, it is one of 13 Class A rivers on the island.

== Course ==
The Mu River rises on the slopes of Mount Karifuri in the Hidaka Mountains. It flows south and west until it reaches the Pacific Ocean at Mukawa.

== Dams ==
| Class 1 river name | Class 2 river name | Name | Height (m) | Water storage capacity (per 1000 m^{3}) | Type | Operator |
|---|---|---|---|---|---|---|
| Mu River | Soshubetsu River | Soshubetsu Dam | 29.0 | 1,330 | Concrete | Hokkaido Electric Power Company |
| Mu River | Hobetsu River | Hobetsu Dam | 38.2 | 10,330 | Rockfill | Hokkaido Regional Development Bureau |

== Tributaries ==
Shimukappu (upper reaches):

- Horoka Tomamu River
- Soshubetsu River
- Pankeshuru River
- Shimu River

Mukawa (lower reaches):

- Ososukenai River
- Tosano River
- Horosaru River
- Hobetsu River
- Rubeshibe River
- Kinausu River
- Inaeppusawa River
- Niwan River
- Yunosawa River
- Chin River
