= Milli mass unit =

Unit of mass

The milli mass unit or (mmu) is used as a unit of mass by some scientific authors even though this unit is not defined by the IUPAP red book nor by the IUPAC green book. It is a short form of the more formally correct "milli unified atomic mass unit" (mu) and equivalent to 1/1000 of the unified atomic mass unit (u). A more modern name is the millidalton (mDa) since the "unified atomic mass unit" has is being superseded by the dalton (1 Da = 1 u).

Since 1961 the unified atomic mass unit "u" has been defined as 1/12 the mass of ^{12}C. Before that the atomic mass unit "amu" was defined as 1/16 the mass of ^{16}O (physics) and as 1/16 the mass of O (chemistry). Thus the publication date in literature ought to be heeded when reading about the milli mass unit as its name does not reveal whether it refers to the old amu or the newer u.

The mass excess is usually indicated in mu or mmu.

In mass spectrometry the mass accuracy of a mass analyzer is often indicated in mu, even though a more correct unit would be mTh (millithomson) since mass spectrometers measure the mass-to-charge ratio, not the mass. The relative mass accuracy is often indicated in ppm, even though this is no longer supported by the IUPAC green book which suggests using units like μTh/Th instead of ppm.
