= Moo moo =

Moo moo or variation, may refer to:

- Mu'umu'u (aka moomoo), a loose dress of Micronesian and Hawaiian origin
- "Moo Moo" (Brooklyn Nine-Nine), a 2017 TV episode of Brooklyn Nine-Nine
- Moo Moo Restaurant, a chain of buffet restaurants in Moscow, Russia
- Moomoo (company), an American stock brokerage owned by Futu
- Sürengiin Möömöö (1930–2021), Mongolian linguist and chess player
- Cow (Mario), also known as a Moo Moo, a recurring species in the Mario Kart series

== See also ==
- Moo (disambiguation)
- Mumu (disambiguation)
- Muumuu (disambiguation)
