= MMU =

MMU may refer to:

== Science and technology ==
- Memory management unit, a computer component
- Manned Maneuvering Unit, a NASA spacesuit rocket pack
- Milli mass unit, an unofficial unit of mass
- Monomethylurea, a urea in synthetic medication

== Education ==
- Manchester Metropolitan University, England
- Marymount University, Arlington, Virginia, US
- Mount Mansfield Union High School, Jericho, Vermont, US
- Mount Meru University, Arusha, Tanzania
- Mountains of the Moon University, Fort Portal, Uganda
- Multimedia University, Malaysia
- Myanmar Maritime University, Thanlyin

== Military ==
- Mobile Meteorological Unit, of the British Armed Forces
- Milli Muharip Uçak, a Turkish fighter aircraft in development

== Other uses ==
- Mega Man Universe, a game by Capcom
- Morristown Municipal Airport, New Jersey, US (IATA:MMU)
