= Moo =

Moo or MOO may refer to:

== In computing ==
- MOO, a type of text-based online virtual reality system and the programming language it uses
- MOO, a version of Bulls and Cows for Unix and Multics
- Moo.fx, a JavaScript effects library

== In entertainment and media ==
- Moo (novel), by Jane Smiley
- Moo, working title of Thug Life (2025 film), an Indian film by Mani Ratnam
- "Mooo!", a song by rapper Doja Cat
- MoO or Master of Orion, a computer game
- "Moo", a song by Cashmere Cat from his 2019 album Princess Catgirl

== People ==
- Barbara E. Moo, American computer scientist
- Douglas J. Moo, scholar who specialized in the New Testament
- Eric Moo, singer and composer
- Moo Ko-Suen, covert agent of China who tried to purchase US military equipment

== Other uses ==
- Moʻo, legendary creatures in Hawaiian mythology
- Moo (restaurant), a Michelin-starred restaurant in Barcelona, Spain
- Moo language, Adamawa language of Nigeria
- Moo (sound), an onomatopoeic word for the sound made by cattle
- Moo or Muban ("village"), the lowest administrative sub-division of Thailand
- Moomba Airport, IATA airport code "MOO"
- Mutual of Omaha, an American mutual insurance and financial services company based in Omaha, Nebraska

== See also ==
- MU (disambiguation)
- Moo2 (disambiguation)
- Moo moo (disambiguation)
