= MW =

MW or mW may refer to:

== Science and technology ==
- MediaWiki (MW), free and open-source wiki software
- Megawatt (MW), a unit of power
- Milliwatt (mW), one thousandth of a watt
- Mud weight (MW), a unit of density used in the oil industry
- .mw, the country code top level domain (ccTLD) for Malawi
- Medium wave (MW), radio frequency range of 530 to 1700 kHz (commonly called the AM band)
- Molecular weight, a former term for molecular mass
- Microwave, a type of electromagnetic wave
- Moment magnitude scale (M_{w}), a measure of earthquake size
- Weight average molecular weight
- .mw, the file extension of a Maple worksheet; see Maple (software)

== Arts and entertainment ==
=== Games ===
- Call of Duty 4: Modern Warfare, a 2007 first person shooter
- Call of Duty: Modern Warfare, a 2019 first person shooter
- MechWarrior, a video game series first released in 1989
- Need for Speed: Most Wanted (disambiguation), two racing video games released in 2005 and 2012

=== Other media ===
- MW (manga), a manga series by Osamu Tezuka
- Miss World, an international beauty pageant
- Museums and the Web, an international conference series
- MW (film), a 2009 Japanese film
- Mythic Warriors, a cartoon series
- MW (Indian magazine), an Indian men's lifestyle magazine

== Companies ==
- Men's Wearhouse, a men's dress apparel retailer
- Merriam-Webster, an American publisher of dictionaries etc.
- Mountain West Conference, an American collegiate sports conference
- Mokulele Airlines (IATA airline designator MW)

== Places ==
- Malawi (ISO 3166-1 country code)
- Midwestern United States region
- Manhattan West, New York, NY, USA

== Other uses ==
- Master of Wine, a wine expertise qualification
- Miracle Whip, a brand of mayonnaise

== See also ==
- MWI (disambiguation)
- MW-1, a German munitions dispenser
- MWA (disambiguation)
- MUU (disambiguation)
- MUV (disambiguation)
- MVU (disambiguation)
- MVV (disambiguation)
