= Mu Dan =

Chinese poet

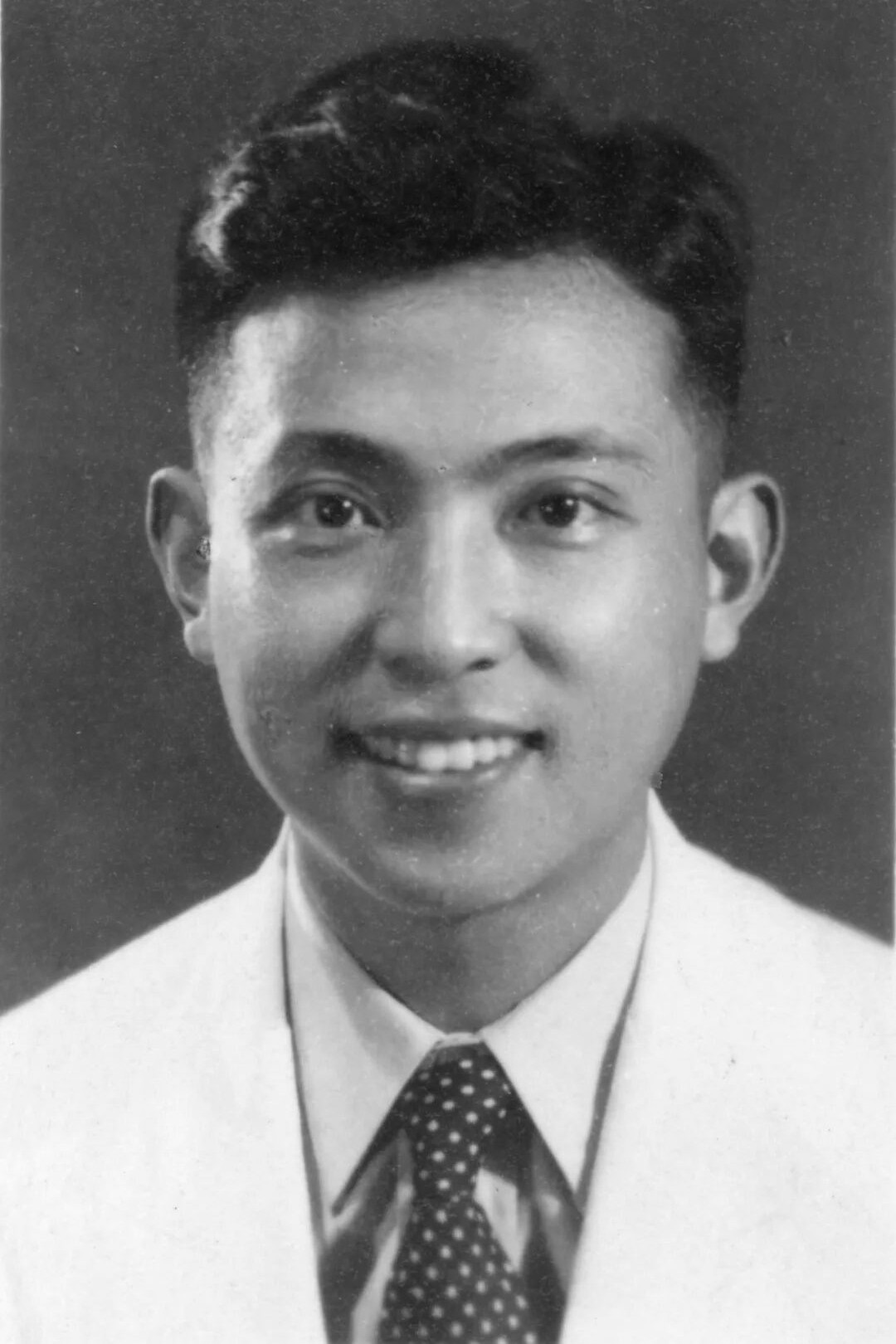
Mu Dan in the mid-to-late 1940s

Zha Liangzheng (simplified Chinese: 查良铮; traditional Chinese: 查良錚; pinyin: Zhā Liángzhēng; 5 April 1918 – 26 February 1977), better known by his pen name Mu Dan (Chinese: 穆旦; pinyin: Mù Dàn), was a Chinese poet. Born in Tianjin, he attended Tsinghua University at the age of 17, and graduated from National Southwestern Associated University in 1940. He served as an assistant lecturer of English at his alma mater for about two years. During World War II, he joined the Chinese Expeditionary Force in Burma and fought alongside the Allied forces against the Japanese. After the war ended, he attended the University of Chicago, where he obtained a master's degree in English literature. He was a distant paternal relative of the wuxia novelist Louis Cha.

Most of Zha's poems were written during the late 1930s and 1940s. His poetry, which is characterised by impassioned speculation, abstract sensuality, and occasionally, restrained irony, is the foremost example of Chinese new vernacular verse absorbing modern Western techniques. Zha was a professed admirer of W. H. Auden, W. B. Yeats and T. S. Eliot. He studied their poetry at Southwest Associated University under William Empson, himself a leading modernist poet. On the other hand, the patriotism and the compassion for the suffering and needy in his poetry fall easily in line with a great tradition in Chinese poetry.

Zha had to give up poetry writing several years after the establishment of the People's Republic of China in 1949, and he turned to literary translation, for which he is also renowned. His works in this respect include the Chinese translations of Lord Byron's Don Juan and Aleksandr Pushkin's Eugene Onegin. It was not until 1976 that Zha resumed writing poetry. He produced 27 poems that year; highly regarded among them were several moving elegy-style pieces. He died suddenly of a heart attack in early 1977.
