= Metropolitan University =

Metropolitan University may refer to:

== Asia ==
- Hong Kong Metropolitan University, Hong Kong, China
- Kuala Lumpur Metropolitan University College, Kuala Lumpur, Malaysia
- Metropolitan University, Sylhet, Bangladesh
- Osaka Metropolitan University, Japan
- Tokyo Metropolitan University, Japan

== Europe ==
- Budapest Metropolitan University, Hungary
- Cardiff Metropolitan University, Wales, United Kingdom
- Leeds Metropolitan University, England, United Kingdom
- London Metropolitan University, England, United Kingdom
- Manchester Metropolitan University, England, United Kingdom
- Metropolitan University (Belgrade), Serbia
- Metropolitan University College, Denmark
- Metropolitan University Prague, Czech Republic
- Oslo Metropolitan University, Norway
- Swansea Metropolitan University, Wales, United Kingdom

== North America ==
- Florida Metropolitan University, Florida, United States
- Metropolitan State University, Minnesota, United States
- Metropolitan University (Puerto Rico)
- Toronto Metropolitan University, Ontario, Canada
- Universidad Autónoma Metropolitana (Metropolitan Autonomous University), Mexico City, Mexico

== South America ==
- Metropolitan University of Educational Sciences, Santiago, Chile
- Metropolitan University of Technology, Santiago, Chile
- Universidad Metropolitana, Caracas, Venezuela

== See also ==
- Coalition of Urban and Metropolitan Universities, an organisation of US universities
- City University (disambiguation)
