= Isocenter =

Isocenter in aerial photography: it is a point where a line cuts an angle of 90 degree of tier/2. It is the point on the aerial photo platform that directly falls on a line half-way between the Principal point and the Nadir point. In imaging physics and radiation oncology, the isocenter is termed as the point in space through which the central rays of the radiation beams pass.

In radiation oncology there is typically talk of two isocenters:

- radiation isocenter and
- mechanical isocenter.

Radiation isocenter is the point in space through which the central beam of radiation passes whereas the mechanical isocenter is the point where optical beams intersect. The two are closely related but differ in terms of their functionality and working in Space.

Isocenter definition in Radiotherapy:

The point in space relative to the treatment machine about which various components of the linac rotate. The gantry rotation defines a horizontal axis which cuts a vertical axis defined by the rotation of the treatment couch. The treatment collimators also rotate about an axis pointing through the isocentre.

The source to isocenter distance (SIsoD) can be an important parameter to control in determining patient exposure and image quality in diagnostic computed tomography and fluoroscopy.
