= Mouse unit =

A mouse unit (MU) is the amount of toxin required to kill a 20g mouse in 15 minutes via intraperitoneal injection. Mouse units are measured by a mouse bioassay, and are commonly used in the shellfish industry when describing relative toxicities for assessing food safety levels for human consumption.
