= Shimukappu =

Shimukappu 占冠村
- Village
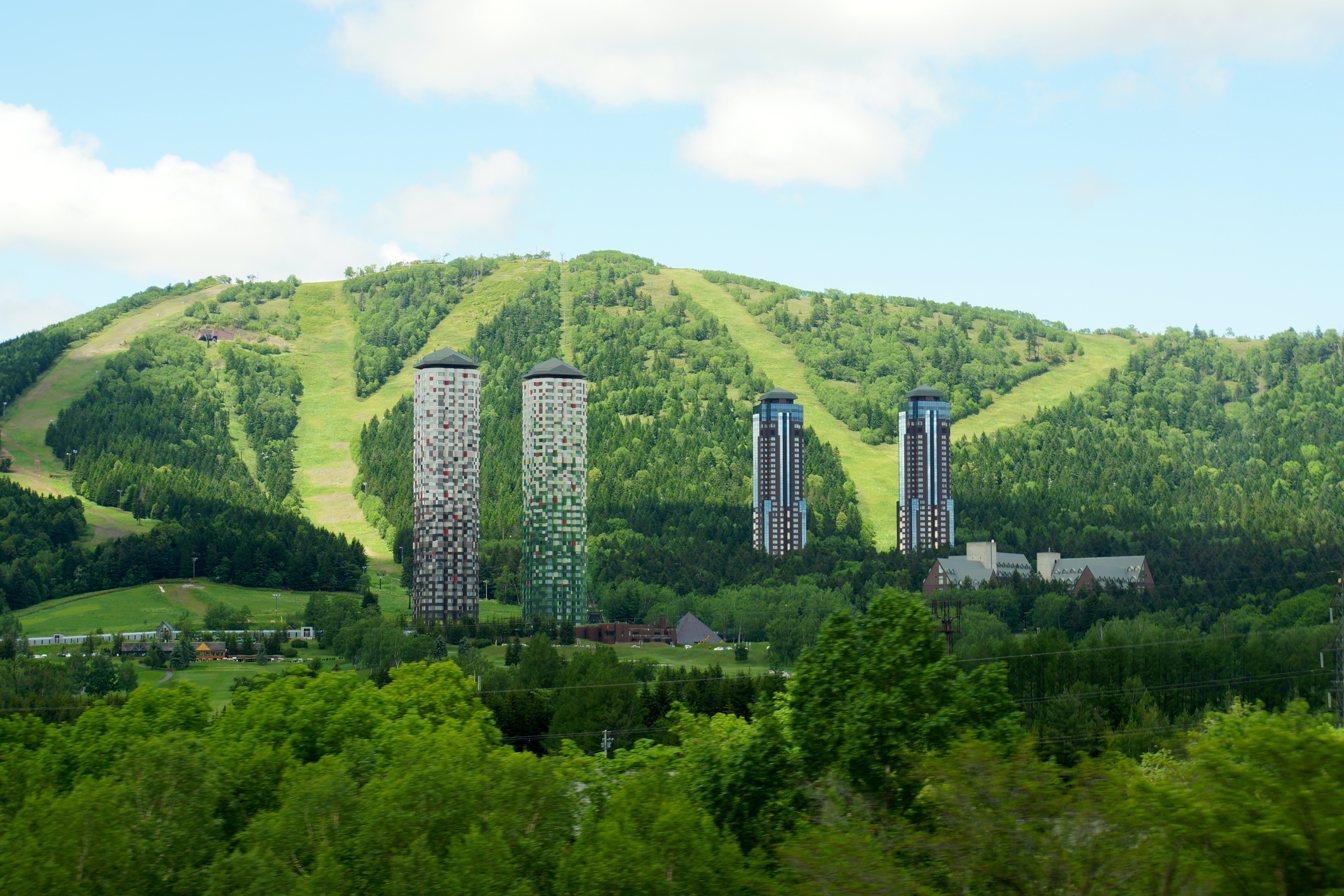
- Hoshino Resorts Tomamu

- Flag Seal

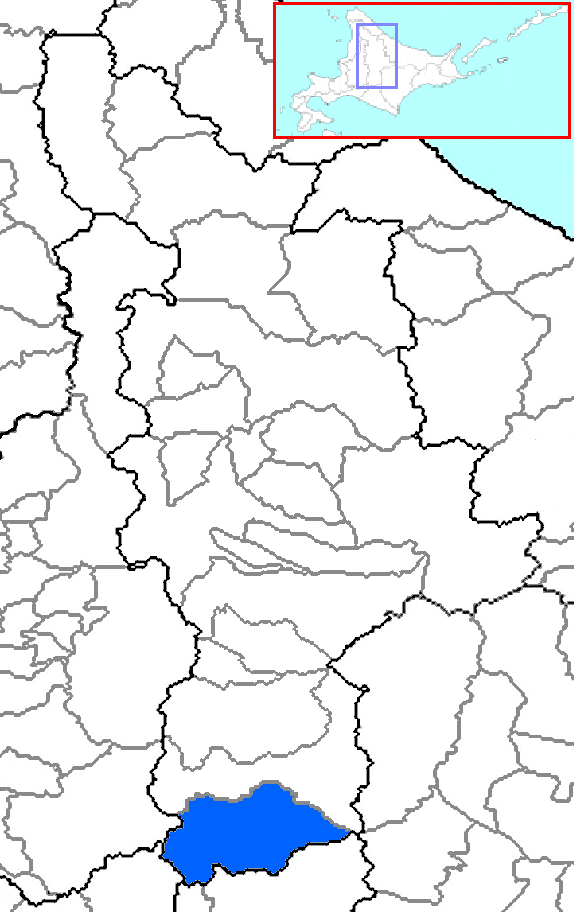
- Location of Shimukappu in Hokkaido (Kamikawa Subprefecture)

- Location in Japan
- Coordinates: 42°59′N 142°24′E
- Country: Japan
- Region: Hokkaido
- Prefecture: Hokkaido (Kamikawa Subprefecture)
- District: Yūfutsu

Area
  - Total: 571.31 km^{2} (220.58 sq mi)

Population (2026)
  - Total: 1,523
  - Density: 2.666/km^{2} (6.904/sq mi)
- Time zone: UTC+09:00 (JST)
- Climate: Dfb
- Website: www.vill.shimukappu.lg.jp

Shimukappu (占冠村, Shimukappu-mura) is a village located in the Kamikawa Subprefecture in the island prefecture of Hokkaido in Japan. It has 1,523 inhabitants.

== Tomamu ==
Tomamu in the eastern part of the village area is the site of the Hoshino Resorts Tomamu, one of Hokkaido's major ski resorts, located on the southern slopes of Mount Tomamu. The resort is dominated by four 40-storey (121 metre) high-rise towers built during the boom of the late 1980s. The exteriors of these buildings have recently been redecorated by Klein Dytham architecture (KDa) of Shibuya, Tokyo to make them harmonize better with their surroundings.

Shimukappu and Tomamu have a student exchange/sister city program with Aspen, Colorado.

== Horoka Tomamu Montane Forest ==
Shimukappu is the location of a new nature reserve, called the Horoka Tomamu Montane Forest, established in 2010, by the United Nations International Year of Biodiversity.

== Climate ==
According to the Köppen climate classification, Shimukappu features a humid continental climate (Dfb) with warm, wet summers and cold, extremely snowy winters.

Climate data for Shimukappu, elevation 332 m (1,089 ft), (1991−2020 normals, extremes 1977−present)
Month	Jan	Feb	Mar	Apr	May	Jun	Jul	Aug	Sep	Oct	Nov	Dec	Year
Record high °C (°F)	6.6 (43.9)	12.4 (54.3)	15.8 (60.4)	24.2 (75.6)	31.7 (89.1)	33.6 (92.5)	34.6 (94.3)	34.2 (93.6)	30.9 (87.6)	25.0 (77.0)	17.9 (64.2)	12.8 (55.0)	34.6 (94.3)
Mean daily maximum °C (°F)	−3.4 (25.9)	−2.3 (27.9)	2.0 (35.6)	9.2 (48.6)	16.7 (62.1)	21.0 (69.8)	24.3 (75.7)	24.7 (76.5)	20.6 (69.1)	13.8 (56.8)	5.7 (42.3)	−1.3 (29.7)	10.9 (51.7)
Daily mean °C (°F)	−9.8 (14.4)	−8.9 (16.0)	−3.7 (25.3)	3.0 (37.4)	9.9 (49.8)	14.8 (58.6)	18.9 (66.0)	19.3 (66.7)	14.6 (58.3)	7.5 (45.5)	0.7 (33.3)	−6.4 (20.5)	5.0 (41.0)
Mean daily minimum °C (°F)	−18.0 (−0.4)	−17.7 (0.1)	−11.0 (12.2)	−3.0 (26.6)	3.2 (37.8)	9.3 (48.7)	14.5 (58.1)	15.0 (59.0)	9.8 (49.6)	2.2 (36.0)	−4.0 (24.8)	−12.4 (9.7)	−1.0 (30.2)
Record low °C (°F)	−35.8 (−32.4)	−35.4 (−31.7)	−32.1 (−25.8)	−21.1 (−6.0)	−5.6 (21.9)	−1.5 (29.3)	4.1 (39.4)	3.8 (38.8)	−0.3 (31.5)	−8.4 (16.9)	−20.3 (−4.5)	−29.3 (−20.7)	−35.8 (−32.4)
Average precipitation mm (inches)	46.6 (1.83)	43.7 (1.72)	65.6 (2.58)	85.9 (3.38)	104.4 (4.11)	77.7 (3.06)	143.5 (5.65)	216.4 (8.52)	167.3 (6.59)	137.2 (5.40)	117.0 (4.61)	77.2 (3.04)	1,291.4 (50.84)
Average snowfall cm (inches)	167 (66)	141 (56)	127 (50)	39 (15)	0 (0)	0 (0)	0 (0)	0 (0)	0 (0)	2 (0.8)	54 (21)	165 (65)	705 (278)
Average extreme snow depth cm (inches)	72 (28)	89 (35)	90 (35)	50 (20)	0 (0)	0 (0)	0 (0)	0 (0)	0 (0)	2 (0.8)	17 (6.7)	48 (19)	95 (37)
Average precipitation days (≥ 1.0 mm)	13.3	12.9	14.1	14.1	12.4	9.3	11.5	12.4	12.7	13.7	16.0	15.7	158.1
Average snowy days (≥ 3 cm)	21.3	18.5	16.5	5.7	0	0	0	0	0	0.3	6.6	20.5	89.4
Mean monthly sunshine hours	83.5	86.8	119.1	150.7	178.7	161.0	136.5	137.4	134.4	124.7	74.8	63.4	1,451.1
Source: Japan Meteorological Agency

== Demographics ==
Historical population

Year	Pop.	±% p.a.
1940	2,298	—
1950	3,072	+2.95%
1955	3,437	+2.27%
1960	4,705	+6.48%
1965	3,306	−6.81%
1970	2,848	−2.94%
1975	1,804	−8.73%
1980	1,601	−2.36%
1985	2,097	+5.55%

Year	Pop.	±% p.a.
1990	2,721	+5.35%
1995	2,104	−5.01%
2000	1,873	−2.30%
2005	1,819	−0.58%
2010	1,393	−5.20%
2015	1,211	−2.76%
2020	1,306	+1.52%
2025	1,487	+2.63%

Source: Statistics Bureau of Japan

== Culture ==
=== Mascot ===
Shimukappy, the village's mascot

Shimukappu's mascot is Shimukappy (しむかっぴー, Shimukappiｰ). She is a Japanese sable with a ‘pretty but sporty personality’. She likes outdoor activities such as skiing and snowboarding. Her favorite food is milk. She was unveiled on 2 August 2014.
