= MV =

MV may refer to:

== Businesses and organizations ==
=== In transportation ===
- Motor vessel, a motorized ship; used as a prefix for ship names
- MV Agusta, a motorcycle manufacturer based in Cascina Costa, Italy
- Armenian International Airways (IATA code MV)
- Metropolitan-Vickers, an electrical equipment and vehicle manufacturer
- Midland Valley Railroad, United States (reporting mark MV)
- Merchant vessel, ship prefix

=== Other organizations ===
- Mieterverband, a Swiss tenant organization
- Millennium Volunteers, a former UK government initiative
- Minnesota Vikings, an American football team
- Miss Venezuela, a beauty pageant
- Museum Victoria, an organization which operates three major state-owned museums in Melbourne, Victoria, Australia

== Places ==
- Martha's Vineyard, an island located south of Cape Cod in Massachusetts
- Maldives (ISO 3166-1 alpha-2 country code MV)
- Mecklenburg-Vorpommern, a German state at the Baltic Sea
- Mountain View, a city in California, US

== People ==
- M. Visvesvaraya, Indian engineer and statesman commonly known as Sir MV
- MV (footballer), nickname of Marcos Vinicius Silvestre Gaspar (born 1998), Brazilian football forward

== In science and technology ==
=== Biology and medicine ===
- Maedi-visna, a sheep disease
- Malvidin, an anthocyanidin
- Measles virus
- Mechanical ventilation
- Minute volume, the volume of air that can be inhaled or exhaled in one minute
- Mitral valve, a valve in the heart connecting the left atrium and left ventricle

=== Computing ===
- mv (Unix), a Unix command that moves one or more files or directories from one place to another
- .mv, top level domain country code for the Republic of Maldives
- MainView, a business automation software
- Materialized view, a database object that contains the results of a query

=== Other uses in science and technology ===
- MV, the abbreviation for megavolt, or 1,000,000 volts, a measure of electrical potential
- Mendelevium, a chemical element with former symbol Mv
- mV, millivolt: 1/1,000 of a volt, a measure of electrical potential
- mv (mass × velocity), momentum in physics
- Mv, viscosity average molar mass, a method to quantify molar mass distribution in chemistry
- Mesovortex, a small scale vortex aloft within atmospheric convection, such as squall lines and tropical cyclones
- Microwave, (occasionally) in the field of satellite remote sensing
- M_{V} is the absolute magnitude of a celestial body such as a star at 10 parsecs in the V passband
- M-V, Japanese space rocket
- Machine vision

== Other uses ==
- MV, Roman numeral for 1005
- Market value, the price at which an asset would trade in a competitive auction setting
- "Moist Vagina", a song by grunge band Nirvana on their single All Apologies
- Music video, a production which combines a piece of music and video clips for artistic purposes
- Meaningful vote, on Brexit
- mezza voce ('half-voice') with subdued or moderated volume in a musical score
- MV, an advisory label for mild violence in the United States pay television content advisory system
