= Camp Mobile =

South Korean mobile app developer

CAMP MOBILE
- Type: Subsidiary
- Industry: Internet and Mobile Application
- Founded: March 1, 2013; 13 years ago, in Seoul, South Korea
- Headquarters: Seoul, South Korea
- Area served: Worldwide
- Key people: Ram Lee & Jongman Park (co-CEOs)
- Products: BAND; SNOW; Whoscall; WatchMaster; LINE Deco; LINE Launcher
- Number of employees: 240
- Parent: Naver Corporation
- Subsidiaries: Camp Mobile Taiwan; Camp Mobile Japan; Camp Mobile USA

Camp Mobile, founded in February 2013, is a mobile application development company based in Seoul, Korea. Ram Lee and Jongmahn Park are the co-CEOs. The company currently operates seven mobile services ranging from social network service to smartwatch application, including BAND, Moot, SNOW, Whoscall, WatchMaster, LINE Deco, and LINE Launcher.

Camp Mobile is a subsidiary of NAVER Corporation, Korea’s dominant search engine and portal. Camp Mobile has international branch offices in the U.S., Taiwan, and India.

== History ==
In February, 2013, Camp Mobile has spun off from NAVER Corporation with the BAND application, a group social network service initially developed inside NAVER. The main purpose behind the spin off was for NAVER to create a separate, agile unit solely focused on creating mobile applications for the overseas market.

In March, 2013, Camp Mobile launched LINE Launcher, an Android launcher application. In December, 2013, Camp Mobile acquired a Taiwanese mobile startup Gogolook, the developer of mobile caller identification service Whoscall.

In March, 2014, Camp Mobile launched LINE Deco, a phone decorating Android/iOS application.

In May, 2015, Camp Mobile launched WatchMaster, a watchface design platform for Android Wear. In September, 2015, Camp Mobile launched SNOW, a camera app featuring filters and animated stickers.

In November 2017, it was announced that Camp Mobile would be merged back into Naver Corporation in February 2018.

== Products ==
Camp Mobile’s mobile applications are as follows:

- BAND, launched in August, 2012, is a group communication service hugely popular in Korea with over 50 million global downloads (as of September, 2015).
- Moot, launched in December, 2017, is a community gaming platform that streamlines the Looking for Group process and allows users to browse gaming news, memes, guides, and more.
- SNOW is a camera app featuring filters and animated stickers with facial recognition capability. SNOW has been ranked number 1 in the camera category on the Appstore in Korea, Vietnam, and the Philippines.
- Whoscall is a mobile spam filter and caller identification service which provides users with information on the caller based on a database populated via the user community's report system. The download number reached 30 million in September, 2015.
- WatchMaster is a watchface design platform for Android Wear. WatchMaster has been selected as Google Play's Featured app.
- LINE Deco is a phone decorating Android/iOS application offering design icons, wallpapers, and widgets. LINE Deco surpassed the 30 million download mark in October, 2015.
- LINE Launcher is an Android launcher app specialized in decorating the phone. The number of downloads reached 20 million in August, 2015.
