= Kim Byung-jong =

South Korean painter

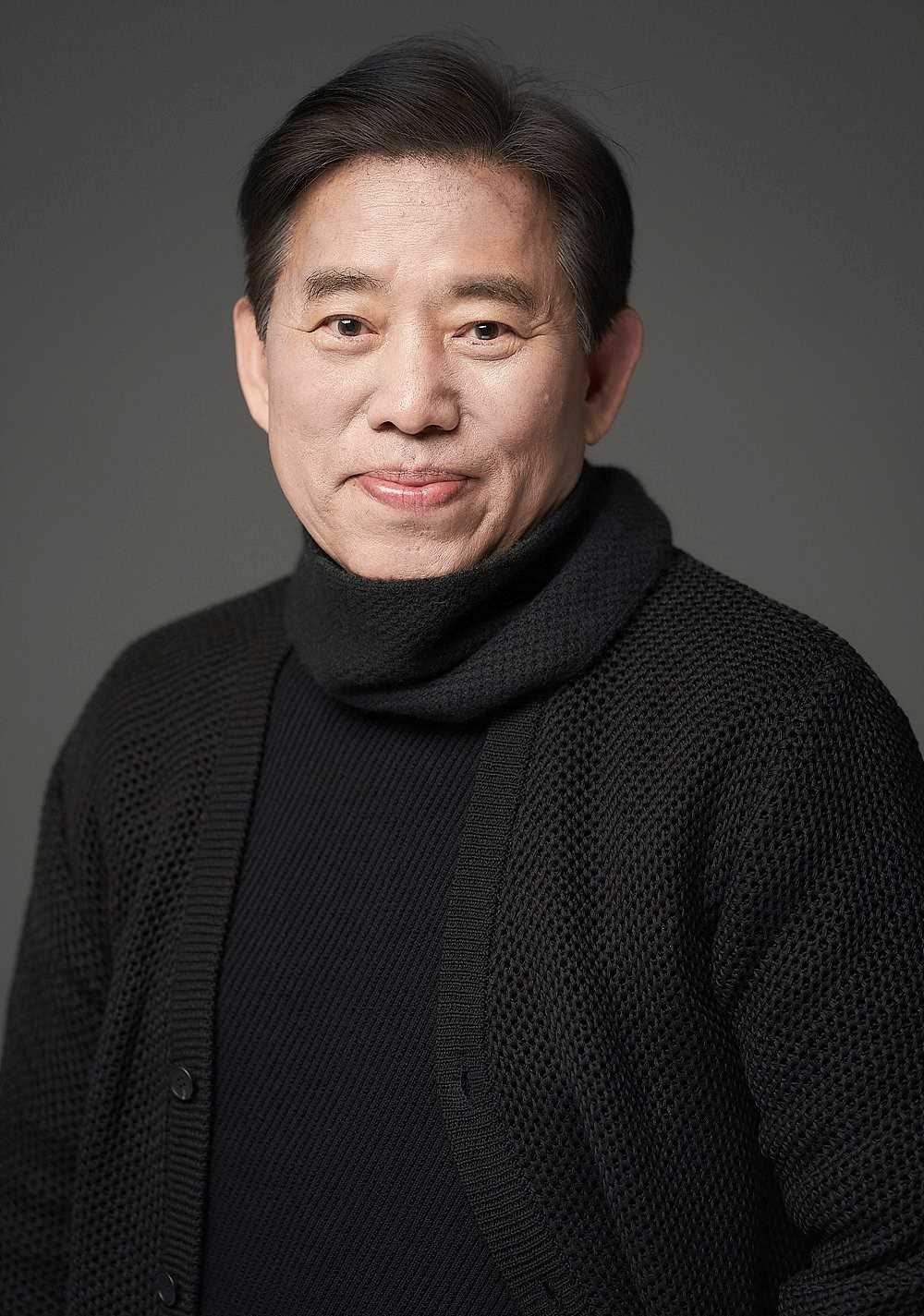
- Born: 1953; Namwon, Jeollabuk-do, South Korean
- Awards: 1979 National University Beauty Exhibition Presidential Award; Anyyeon Art and Culture Award; Proud Jeonbuk Impression; Green Green Geunjeong Medal; Republic of Korea Cultural Merit

Korean name
- Hangul: 김병종
- RR: Gim Byeongjong
- MR: Kim Pyŏngjong

Art name
- Hangul: 단아
- Hanja: 旦兒
- RR: Dana
- MR: Tana

Kim Byung-jong (Korean: 김병종; born 1953), also known by his art name Dan-A (단아), is a South Korean representative painter, known for his unique painting style that encompasses the East and the West, the traditional and the modern.

== Education ==
- 1980 B.F.A., Dept. of Painting, Seoul National University
- 1982 M.F.A., Dept. of Painting, Seoul National University
- 2001 Ph.D., Dept. of East Asian Philosophy, Sungkyunkwan University

== Life and work ==
Kim is well known for his unique painting style that encompasses the East and the West, the traditional and the modern. Born in 1953 in Namwon, Jeollabuk-do, Kim was admitted to the Department of Painting at College of Fine Arts, Seoul National University where he also received his master's degree. He received the Presidential Award at the National University Art Exhibition in 1979, making his debut with awards in both the fields of art criticism and playwriting at the Annual Spring Literati Contests at The Dong-A Ilbo and JoongAng Ilbo daily newspapers in 1980. He began teaching at his alma mater in 1983, and was appointed as Professor in 1985. In 2001, he received his Ph.D. in Oriental Philosophy at Sungkyunkwan University. In the same year, he was appointed as Dean of College of Fine Arts at Seoul National University, and in 2002 and 2003 as Director of the Seoul National University Visual Arts Institute and Seoul National University Museum of Art, respectively. In 2018, at the retirement ceremony of Seoul National University where he held tenure for 36 years, he delivered a representative speech among 46 retiring professors, which was exceptional for a professor in the college of arts. Currently he is emeritus professor at Seoul National University and Gachon University.

His major exhibitions include The Scattering Pine Pollen (Gana Art Center, 2019), From Jesus the Fool to Song of Life (Seoul National University Museum of Art, 2018), 生命之歌 Song of Life (Beijing Today Art Museum, 2015), 30 Years of Kim Byung-Jong–Drawing Life (Jeonbuk Museum of Art, 2014), and he has held more than 20 solo exhibitions in Seoul, Beijing, Paris, Chicago, Brussels, Basel, Tokyo and Berlin. He has participated in leading domestic and international art fairs including the Foire Internationale d'Art Contemporain, Art Basel, Gwangju Biennale, Beijing International Art Biennale and Triennale-India. He has received art awards including AnGyeon Art and Culture Grand Prize, the Proud Jeonbuk People Prize, the Green Order of Merit for Diligence and the National Order of Korean Culture. His published books include Journey with the Painting Book 1-4 (Munhakdongne, 2014), and Chinese Painting Study (Seoul National University Press, 1997). His works are in the collections of the British Museum, London; Royal Ontario Museum, Toronto; National Museum of Modern and Contemporary Art, South Korea; Seoul Museum of Art and the Blue House, South Korea. In March 2018, Namwon Byung-Jong Kim Art Museum opened in Namwon, Jeollabuk-do.

It is widely known that Kim conveys the unique spirit of Korean painting and national consciousness, yet deploys modern expression that spans across media, thus leading the modernization and globalization of Korean paintings. His notable artworks include Jesus the Fool (1998~), Song of Life (1989), The Scattering Pine Pollen (2016), Wind and Bamboo (2017). With extensive subject matter including flowers, trees, portraits of Jesus, landscapes of travel destinations, memories from childhood, pine pollen blowing in wind, and the scenery of bamboo forests, Kim articulates free, dynamic and diverse expressions. He is called 'the life artist' as his œuvre revolves around the theme of life, and his various works with nature as the subject show sprouting vitality and poetic beauty in variegated ways. Another trait permeating Kim's works is the matière of its thick texture that can be seen on the painting's surface. He has invented the method of painting by applying various pigments and stone powder onto the thick surface of the canvas made out of Korea mulberry paper. His artworks often show his unique technique resembling Western relief or Eastern concavo-convex methods. Through these works, he goes beyond the conventional techniques of Oriental paintings or ancient highbrow techniques of Chinese paintings, and pursues his unique way of representation, seeking his individual and independent form of Korean modern painting by embodying traditional Korean aesthetics and the theories of Oriental painting.

== Teaching career ==
- Emeritus Professor, Seoul National University
- Chair Professor, Gachon University
- Vice Chairman, Seoul National University Alumni Association
- 1984-2018 Professor, Dept. of Oriental Painting, Seoul National University
- 2001-2003 Department Chair, Seoul National University College of Fine Arts
- 2001-2003 Director, Seoul National University Museum of Art

== Solo exhibitions ==
- 1990 Black Revelation (Gyor Municipal Museum, Hungary)
- 1990 Song of Life, The Exhibition of Journal association prize (Dongsanbang Gallery, Seoul)
- 1993 Black Revelation (Guardini Kunst Stiftung Museum, Germany)
- 1996 Song of life (Gallery Gana-Beaubourg, France)
- 1999 Song of life (Gana Art Center, Seoul)
- 2004 From Jesus, 'the Fool' to Song of Life (Gwangju Biennale, Gwangju)
- 2013 Song of life (Dugahun Gallery, Gallery Hyundai, Seoul)
- 2014 Painting the Life (Gyodong Art Center, Jeonju)
- 2014 Painting the Life (Jeonbuk Museum of Art, Wanju)
- 2015 生命之歌 (Song of Life) (Today Art Museum, Beijing)
- 2018 From Jesus, ‘the Fool’ to Song of Life (Seoul National University Museum of Art, Seoul)

== Museum collection ==
=== Overseas museums ===
- The British Museum, London
- Royal Ontario Museum, Canada
- The EC Embassy, Belgium
- Bangladesh Museum of Art, Bangladesh
- Columbia Museum of Art, Columbia
- Budapest Museum of Contemporary Art, Hungary

=== South Korean museums ===
- National Museum of Contemporary Art Korea, Seoul & Gwacheon
- Seoul Museum of Art, Seoul
- Gwangju Museum of Art, Gwangju
- Daejeon Museum of Art, Daejeon
- Jeonbuk Museum of Art, Jeonju
- Namwon City Kim Byung Jong Art Museum, Namwon
- Seogwipo Gidang Museum of Art, Jeju
- Museum of Seoul National University, Seoul
- Museum of Hanyang University, Seoul
- Hoam Art Museum, Yongin
- Olympic center, Seoul

== Awards and prizes ==
- 1979 National University Art Exhibition Presidential Award
- 1980 National University Presidential Award
- 1980 JoongAng Ilbo Annual Spring Literary Contest for Drama (First Prize)
- 1980 The Dong-A Ilbo Annual Spring Literary Contest for Art Criticism (First Prize)
- 1981 Samsung Foundation Author Award, Samsung Foundation of Culture • 1981 Korea Culture and Arts Awards, Ministry of Culture and Information
- 1989 The Korean Publishing Culture Award (Hankook Ilbo), Korean Art Artist Award (「Art era」)
- 1989 Korean Journal association prize
- 1990 The Prize for the Arts, Samsung
- 1991 Korean Artists association prize
- 1992 Korea Artist Prize
- 1995 Sun Arts association prize, Sun Gallery
- 1997 Christian Cultural association prize
- 1998 Jeonbuk Grand Prize
- 2004 17th Korean Christian Art Awards, Korean Christian Art Association
- 2014 Korea Order of Cultural Merit, Ministry of Culture, Sports and Tourism
- 2018 HeoBaekRyeon Art Award, Jeollanam-do
- 2018 Green Stripes of Korea's Order of Service Merit
- 2019 Proud Jeonbuk People's Award, Jeollabuk-do provincial assembly
- 2020 White One Art Award, Gallery White One
- 2021 The 5th Korea Angyeon Grand Art Competition
- 2022 16th Korea Artist Award, Korean Fine Arts Association
