= Seoul Fashion Week =

Fashion event in Seoul, South Korea

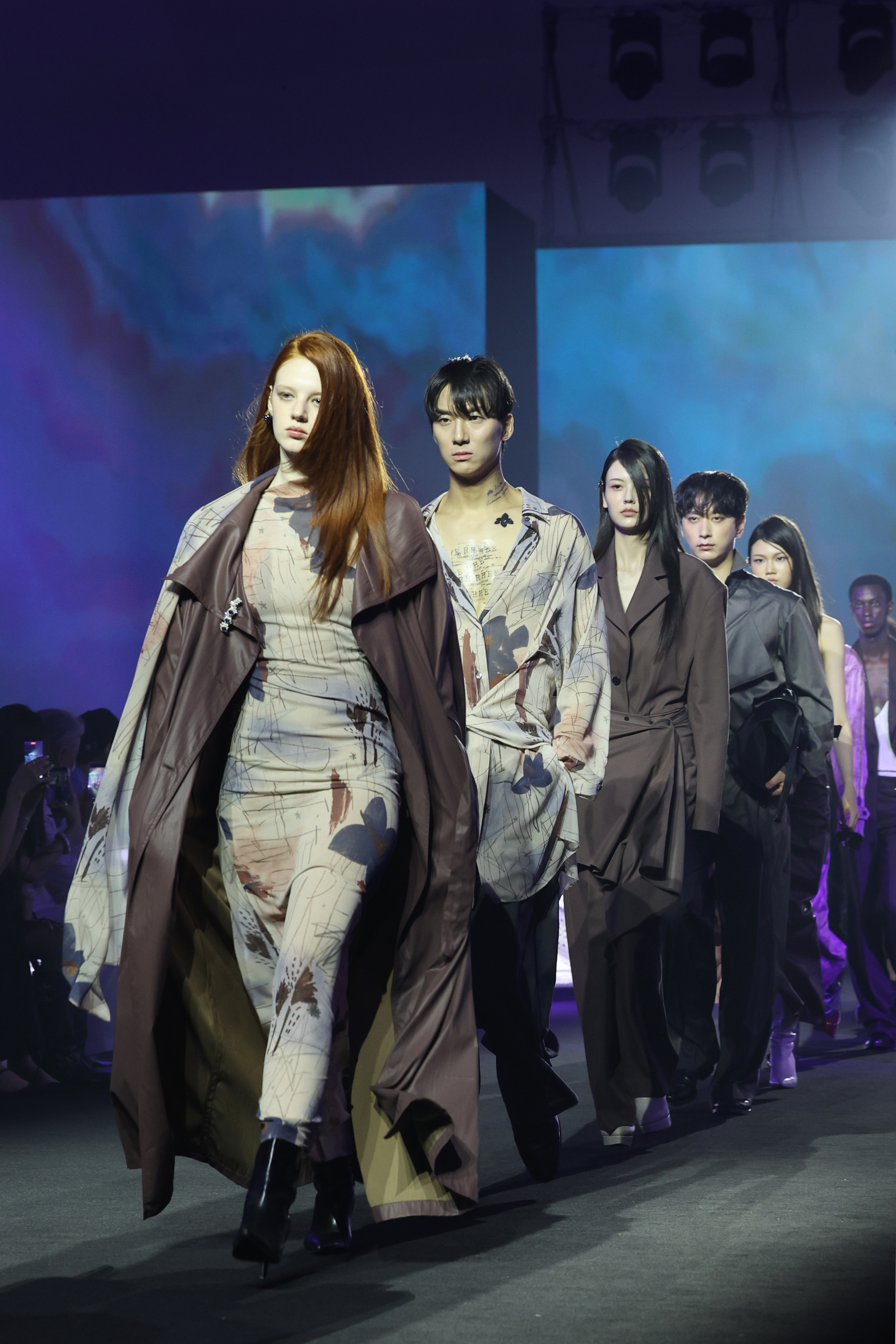
- Seoul Fashion Week 2027 S/S
- Genre: Clothing and fashion exhibitions
- Dates: Spring and fall
- Frequency: Semiannual
- Locations: Seoul, South Korea
- Inaugurated: 2000
- Organiser: Seoul Design Foundation
- Website: seoulfashionweek.org

Seoul Fashion Week (SFW; Korean: 서울패션위크) is a biannual fashion event held in Seoul, South Korea. Organized by the Seoul Design Foundation under the Seoul Metropolitan Government, it has grown into one of the most prominent fashion weeks in Asia. It presents collections by Korean and international designers to buyers and the media. The main venue is Dongdaemun Design Plaza.

== History ==
The event traces its official runway programme to the first Seoul Collection in October 2000, part of an effort to promote the South Korean fashion industry. Early editions were staged at changing venues in Seoul. Generation Next, a platform for emerging designers, was introduced in 2008.

In 2014 the event moved to Dongdaemun Design Plaza (DDP) and came under the Seoul Design Foundation. In 2015 designer Jung Ku-ho was appointed director and cosmetics brand Hera became title sponsor, after which some editions were billed as Hera Seoul Fashion Week.

The 2025 spring/summer edition took place from September 3 to 7, 2024, at Dongdaemun Design Plaza. The programme placed an emphasis on sustainable fashion and was announced to include runway shows by 21 brands, presentations by five brands, and a trade show involving 92 brands.

The 2025 fall/winter edition was held from February 5 to 9, 2025, at Dongdaemun Design Plaza and fashion districts including Seongsu, Hannam, and Sinsa–Cheongdam. The edition introduced the first Seoul Fashion Forum and used a two-track trade-show programme consisting of order exhibitions and showroom tours.

== Format ==
Seoul Fashion Week is held twice a year, for the spring/summer and fall/winter seasons. Its main programmes are the Seoul Collection for established designers, Generation Next for emerging labels, and a trade show connecting brands with buyers. DDP has been the principal venue since 2014. Later editions have also used other sites in the city, including historic and commercial locations such as Deoksugung and Lotte World Tower.

The 2026 fall/winter edition took place from February 3 to 8, 2026, at DDP and presented 24 collections through 15 runway shows and nine presentations.

The 2027 spring/summer edition was held from September 1 to 6, 2026, at DDP and the Lotte World Tower area in Jamsil, combining designer presentations and trade-show activities with public fashion and cultural events. The Jamsil programme also used the outdoor World Park area at Lotte World Mall.

== Digital editions ==
During the COVID-19 pandemic the event shifted to digital or hybrid formats. The 2021 S/S edition, held in late 2020, was presented as a non-contact runway; Ji Chun-hee's Miss Gee Collection opened the season. Subsequent seasons used pre-recorded fashion films at landmarks across Seoul before live shows returned at DDP.

The 2026 fall/winter edition drew approximately 12,000 in-person visitors and recorded about 64,000 online views of livestreams and digital content.

== Celebrity participation ==
Seoul Fashion Week has long mixed professional models with celebrities on the runway. Korean designers have invited well-known models, actors and singers to walk their shows, a practice covered regularly by domestic entertainment and fashion press. In 2018, Jang Yoon-ju, Lee Hyun-yi and Byun Jung-soo walked the Miss Gee Collection. In 2019, Lee Ki-woo walked Songzio Homme; Cha Seung-won, a longtime muse of the label, has appeared in its presentations for decades. In 2020, Cha Eun-woo made his runway debut in the Miss Gee Collection. In 2021, Kai of Exo filmed a promotional runway look for Bmuet(te) as a Seoul Fashion Week ambassador. In 2022, Go Min-si and Hwang Bo-reum-byeol walked the Miss Gee Collection, and Cha Seung-won, Bae Jung-nam, Lee Ki-woo and Han Hye-jin later opened the season for Songzio. In 2025, Kasia and Sasha of Ifeye walked for Re Rhee. In 2026, Hwang Chan-sung of 2PM walked Re Rhee's opening show.

== International profile ==
Seoul Fashion Week has received periodic coverage from international fashion media, including Vogue and Business of Fashion. Vogue reported that organizers estimated about 10,000 visitors a day at recent editions. The South China Morning Post wrote in 2017 that, among newer fashion weeks, Seoul Fashion Week had attracted the most international praise.

Organizers have used the event to connect Korean labels with overseas buyers. The Seoul Metropolitan Government reported trade-show consultation values of US$6.13 million for the 2025 S/S season, US$6.71 million for 2025 F/W, US$7.45 million for 2026 S/S, and US$7.54 million for 2026 F/W. The 2026 F/W trade show involved 102 Korean fashion brands and 99 buyers from 23 countries, with 1,772 business consultations. Buyers from department stores and multi-brand retailers in Europe, North America and Asia have attended the trade show. The city has also supported selected designers showing abroad, including presentations tied to Paris and Milan fashion weeks.

For the 2026 spring/summer edition, Seoul Fashion Week collaborated with Berlin Fashion Week's Berlin Showroom, bringing 12 emerging Berlin brands to a showroom in Gangnam in September 2025.

For the 2027 spring/summer edition, the trade show connected 106 Korean fashion brands with 98 overseas buyers from 20 countries and recorded approximately US$7.57 million in order consultations, according to preliminary figures compiled as of September 4, 2026.
