= Samoo Architects & Engineers =

South Korean multinational company

SAMOO Architects & Engineers
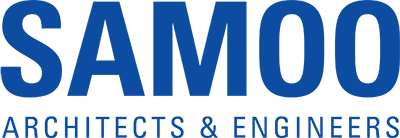
- Company type: Limited company
- Founded: Seoul, South Korea (1976)
- Headquarters: SEOUL HQ East Central Tower, 1077, Cheonho-daero, GangDong-gu, Seoul, South Korea 05340
- Key people: Chang Kyu Sohn (CEO)
- Services: Architectural Design, Urban Design, Interior Design, Sustainable Design, Building Information Modeling, Construction Management
- Parent: Samsung C&T Corporation
- Website: www.samoo.com

Samoo Architects & Engineers (Korean: 삼우종합건축사사무소, SAMOO) is a multinational company headquartered in Seoul which provides architecture and engineering design related services such as architectural design, engineering, interior design, urban design, sustainable design, construction management, and building information modelling.

== History ==
The Samoo Architectural Research Institute was founded in 1976. The company was acquired by Samsung C&T Corporation in 2014. Samoo has been involved in projects for various Samsung affiliates, including Samsung Electronics, Samsung Display, Samsung SDI, Samsung Biologics, and Samsung Life Insurance.

== Notable projects ==
The Americas
Name of Buildings	Location	Year built	Awards won
New York Korean Center	New York, USA	2010	WAN AWARD Civic Building Sector

Asia-Pacific Region
Name of Buildings	Location	Year built	Collaboration	Awards won
LCT The Sharp Landmark Tower	Busan, South Korea	2019	Skidmore Owings & Merrill	
The Presidential Archive of Korea	Sejong City, South Korea	2015	Kunwon ABLine	
Seoul Upcycling Plaza	Seoul, South Korea	2015		
Korea Gas Corporation Headquarters	Daegu, South Korea	2014		
National Library of Sejong City	Seoul, South Korea	2013	KeunJeong Architects & Engineers Inc	
Buk Seoul Museum of Art	Seoul, South Korea	2013	ARCH Architects Group Co., Ltd.	
Branksome Hall Asia Jeju Global Education City	Seogwipo, South Korea	2012		
D-Cube City	Seoul, South Korea	2011		2012 MIPIM People's Choice Award
Gyeongju Arts Center	Gyeongju, South Korea	2010		
NHN Green Factory	Seongnam, South Korea	2010	NBBJ	
2014 Incheon Asian Games Gyeyang Stadium	Incheon, South Korea	2010	Forum Architects & Engineers	
2014 Incheon Asian Games Namdong Stadium	Incheon, South Korea	2010	Forum Architects & Engineers	
Green Tomorrow	Yongin, South Korea	2010	ARUP	First LEED Platinum building in East Asia Residential Architecture: Individual Houses BCI Green Design Award
Phoenix Island Villa Condo & Club House	Jeju, South Korea	2008	Mario Botta	2009 MIPIM Award in the Hotels and Tourism Resort Category 2011 Honorable Mention, Red Dot Design Award
Tokyo Korean Culture Center	Tokyo, Japan	2009	Nihon Sekkei Park Hang Sub (Kyungwon University)	
Gwacheon National Science Museum	Gwacheon, South Korea	2009	Space Group Co. Ltd. Terry Farrell & Partners Ltd.	
Samsung Town	Seoul, South Korea	2009	Kohn Pedersen Fox	Business Centers Category MIPIM Asia Awards
Dongdaemun Design Plaza & Park	Seoul, South Korea	2007	Zaha Hadid	
Korea National University of Arts	Seokgwan Campus, Seokgwan-dong, Seoul, South Korea	2006		
Seoul National University Museum of Art	Seoul, South Korea	2005	Rem Koolhaas	
Leeum, Samsung Museum of Art	Seoul, South Korea	2004	Mario Botta Jean Nouvel Rem Koolhaas	
Samsung Tower Palace	Seoul, South Korea	2004		
Daegu Opera House	Daegu, South Korea	2004		
Seoul Museum of Art Expansion and Remodeling	Seoul, South Korea			
Suwon World Cup Stadium	Suwon, South Korea	2001	SCAU	
Incheon International Airport Transportation Center,	Incheon, South Korea	2001	Terry Farrell & Partners DMJM	
Jongno Tower	Seoul, South Korea	1999	Rafael Vinoly	
Yongin Transportation Museum,	Yongini, South Korea	1999		
Rodin Gallery	Seoul, South Korea	1997	Kohn Pedersen Fox	
