= Yumin Art Nouveau Collection =

The Yumin Art Nouveau collection is a collection of Art Nouveau glass, gathered by Yumin Hong Jin-gi, former chairman of Joongang Ilbo. It is housed in a permanent exhibit in the Genius Loci building of the Phoenix Island Villa Condo & Club House, Seopjikoji on the eastern coast of Jeju Island, South Korea.

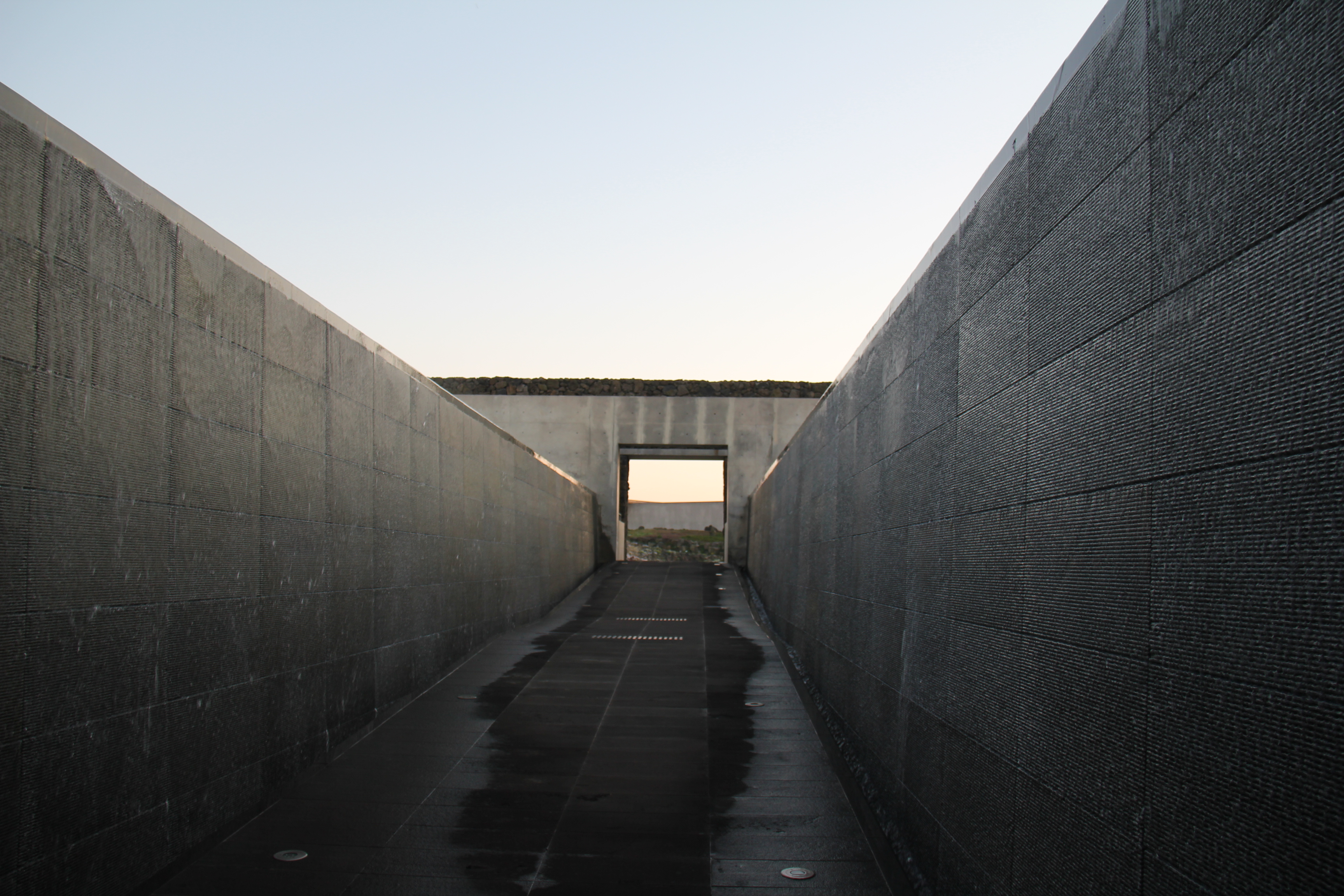

The collection exhibits the works of leading French Art Nouveau artists including Emile Gallé, Daum, Eugène Michel, and René Lalique.

== Collection ==
Art Nouveau was a trend in Europe and the United States that lasted about 20 years, beginning around 1890. It inspired applied arts, crafts, and design. Glass artists of Nancy in the Lorraine region were at the center of the Arts and Crafts movement. Nancy artists advanced the technique of glass crafts from pipe blowing (Pontil) to more sophisticated methods of color-glass layering, in-laying, sculpting, engraving, and etching. These styles and techniques enabled them to adopt nature as their primary source of inspiration.

The Yumin Art Nouveau Collection, much of which originated in the Nancy region, is the result of the endeavours of the late Yumin Hong Jin-gi, former chairman of Joongang Ilbo. The Yumin Art Nouveau Collection endeavours to display the notable techniques and aesthetic values of the artwork along with the passion and spirit representative of the Ecole de Nancy.

== Building ==
The building housing the collection was created by Osaka-based Japanese architect Ando Tadao, known for his use of reinforced concrete and strong engagement with nature. Genius Loci, placed at the center of Seopjikoji, is one of Ando's key projects, along with the neighbouring Glass House. Both structures emphasize the importance of simplicity. Originally built as a meditation hall and media art zone, the interior was redesigned by JAC Studios to display the collection.

== Representative works ==
The collection consists of an exterior garden created with the concept of Jeju's nature and geographical characteristics, as well as four exhibition rooms that display art nouveau glassworks. They are titled "Room of Inspiration", "Room of Masterpiece", "Room of Art Nouveau Heyday", and "Room of Lamp".

About 50 works by glass artists from the Nancy region are exhibited in the gallery, including art produced by Emile Gallé, Antonin Daum and Auguste Daum, and Eugène Michel. "Room of Inspiration" is a nature-themed space where the spectators can sit on the floor and quietly enjoy meditation and appreciate the art, while in "Room of Masterpiece", visitors can see the mushroom lamp, the integration of Emile Gallé’s art philosophy, and the craft technology popular at the time. In "Room of Art Nouveau Heyday", various works by Nancy artists are arranged horizontally to create a unique atmosphere, while the "Room of Lamp" allows spectators to enjoy a lamp collection that continuously changes color. Each exhibition room showcases many shapes and lights, etc.

Gallé's mushroom lamp was produced in 1902. Only 5 examples of this lamp exist, while the one exhibited is appraised to be the most cleanly preserved work. Other works of Gallé such as "Dragonfly Vase" along with Daum's "Field Poppy Motif Vase" and"Blue Tulip Motif Lamp", and Michel's "Sirène et Iris", are on display.
