= Naver Green Factory =

Green Factory
- 그린팩토리
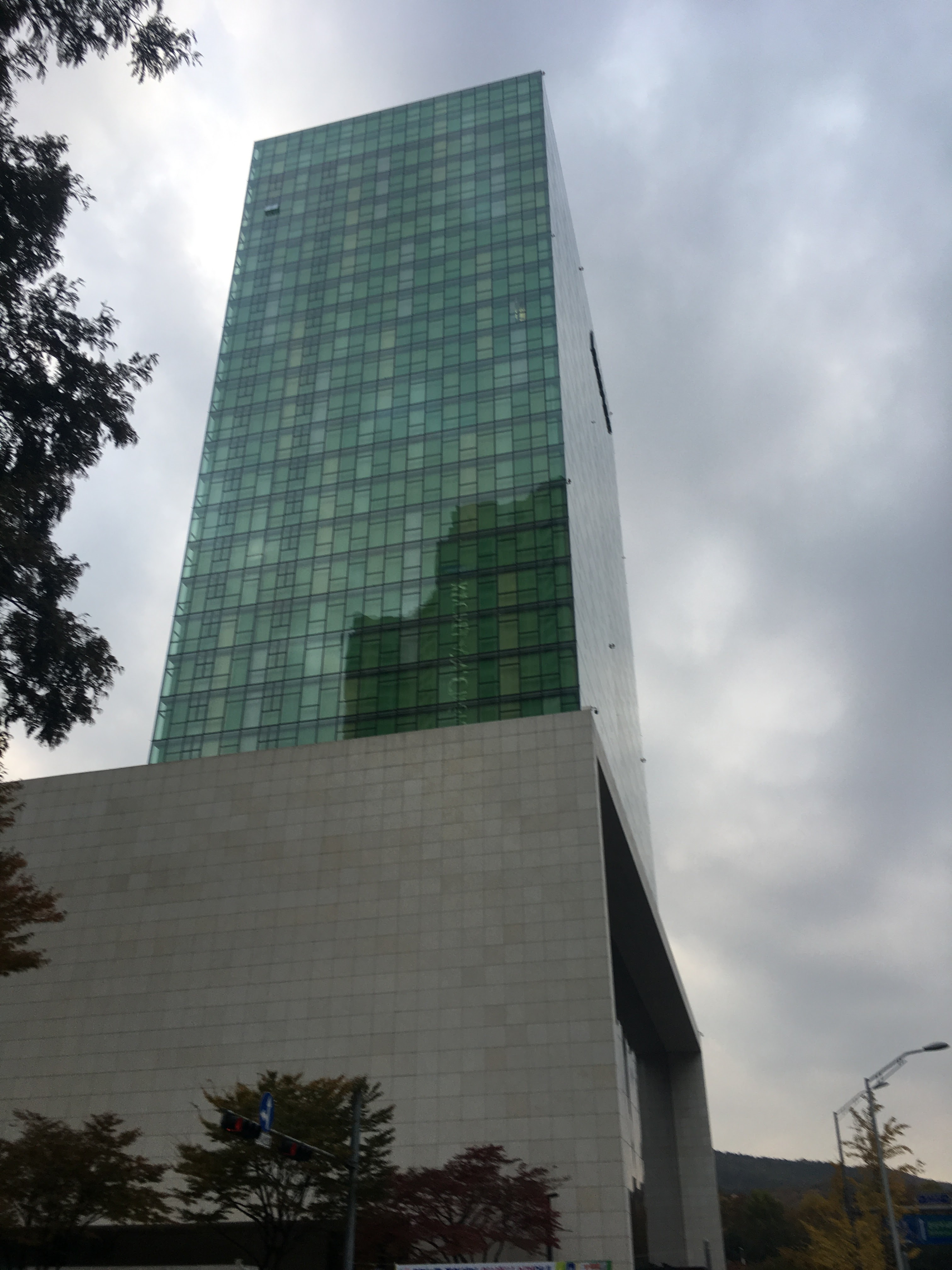

General information
- Type: Office Building
- Location: Seongnam, South Korea
- Coordinates: 37.3593°N 127.1052°E
- Construction started: 2007
- Completed: 2010
- Client: Naver Corporation

Height
- Height: 135.3 m (444 ft)

Technical details
- Floor count: 27 Stories and 7 Basements
- Floor area: 101,661 sq. meters
- Lifts/elevators: 19

Design and construction
- Architecture firm: Samoo Architects & Engineers, NBBJ
- Structural engineer: Kyungjai Structural Engineers
- Civil engineer: Saegil Engineering & Consulting Co., ltd.
- Other designers: Landscape: Soltos Fire

Other information
- Parking: 799 spaces

The Naver Green Factory is an office building located in Bundang-gu Seongnam-si of South Korea, and serves as the headquarters of Naver Corporation, a Korean internet content service company. The building was completed in March 2010, with 27 floors above ground and 7 floors underground.

The Green Factory's energy-saving features helped it win the acclaimed Good Design award in 2011. The building is also certified as 'Platinum' under the global green building design rating system LEED.

== Planning and construction ==
The interior of the building was designed to provide as open an environment as possible, where the company's culture and values would be reflected. The intent was to create a working space which fosters better communication between employees.

== Design and structure ==
=== Design ===
Green Factory's office spaces are designed like pods, which focus on a central open meeting area. Most of the central meeting spaces have non-traditional furniture and match the casual theme represented throughout the rest of the interior.

=== Indoor facilities ===
Unlike the rest of the building, the first and second floors are open to the public. Facilities found in the lobby include the library, the magazine street, and the information desk.

The library provides a variety of books and encyclopedias, including a collection of around 16,000 thousand books from 38 countries over the world. The magazine street refers to an area furnished with bookshelves displaying 250 kinds of magazines, both in Korean and foreign languages, with various different categories including fashion, beauty, sports, leisure, IT, cooking, business, economy, and so on. Visitors also have access to a cafe selling beverages and snacks, as well as a store selling character products made by Naver and Line. Part of the profits go to organizations that support the disabled.

The Connect Hall, which is located on the second floor, is a multipurpose auditorium for meetings, lectures, seminars, concerts, and weddings. The auditorium can accommodate up to 260 people, and has power sockets underneath each seat so that visitors can use their laptops freely.

The Green Factory also has an exercise center where professional trainers provides personalized workout programs for employees. Other facilities include a café, an outdoor terrace, a healthcare center, a shower room, a recovery room, and a massage room. On the same floor there is also a convenience store, a travel agency, an insurance agency, a postal service, and a help desk.

The emergency stairs sport different patterns and designs instead of the typical painted concrete finish. One side is themed like a park, and it is intended to have a peaceful and eco-friendly atmosphere with brighter lighting. The other side is designed like a track, encouraging employees to exercise by indicating the number of calories burnt.

=== Louvers ===
The steel and glass façade houses adjustable vertical louvers which restrict or allow sunlight to enter the building. The louvers are automatically closed and opened at times of sunrise and sunset, allowing the building to save energy. On special occasions, the façade displays different images such as the company's logo. Internal light is selectively blocked by a nocturnal automated louver system.

== Maintenance ==
Green Factory was originally built as a working space for around 3,000 employees, but it is currently overpopulated, raising the necessity for an expansion. Naver has begun the construction of its second head office building adjacent to the current headquarters on a 120,000 square-meter site that it purchased from Seongnam city for 123.5 billion won (US$111 million).

== See also ==
- Naver (corporation)
- Naver (search engine)
