= Daegu Opera House =

Opera house in Daegu, South Korea

- 대구오페라하우스
- Interactive map of the Daegu Opera House area

General information
- Type: Opera House
- Location: Daegu, South Korea
- Coordinates: 35°53′0″N 128°35′32″E

Technical details
- Floor count: 4 floors and 2 basements

Design and construction
- Architecture firm: Samoo Architects & Engineers

Other information
- Seating capacity: 1,490
- Parking: Underground 132 vehicles, Outdoor 268 vehicles

Website
- www.daeguoperahouse.org

Daegu Opera House (Korean: 대구오페라하우스) is an opera house located in Buk-gu, Daegu, South Korea.

The opera house is a concrete structure reinforced with steel trusses, and seats 1490 people. The six-story building was constructed between 2000 and 2003, at a total cost of 44 billion won.
