= Seoul Design Foundation =

The Seoul Design Foundation was initially proposed on November 20, 2008, by the Seoul Metropolitan Government in order to promote design industry. It launched on March 2, 2009, and is run by direct endowment from the Seoul City. It consists of a group of design experts.

== History ==
In 2015, the Seoul Design Foundation implemented various projects promoting Seoul’s design industry and spread design culture with its monumental multipurpose complex Dongdaemun Design Plaza (DDP). DDP aims to become the hub of global design.

The initiative aims to strengthen Seoul’s design capacity by unfolding various projects to promote Seoul’s design industry and spread design culture based on its flagship facilities, the Dongdaemun Design Plaza & Park.

It is located at: 3F,9F, Yeonho Bldg., 21-1, Seosomun-dong, Jung-gu, Seoul.

== Activities ==
- Seoul Design Week
- Human City Design Award
- DDP (Dongdaemun Design Plaza)
- Seoul Fashion Week
