= Naver Corporation =

South Korean internet conglomerate

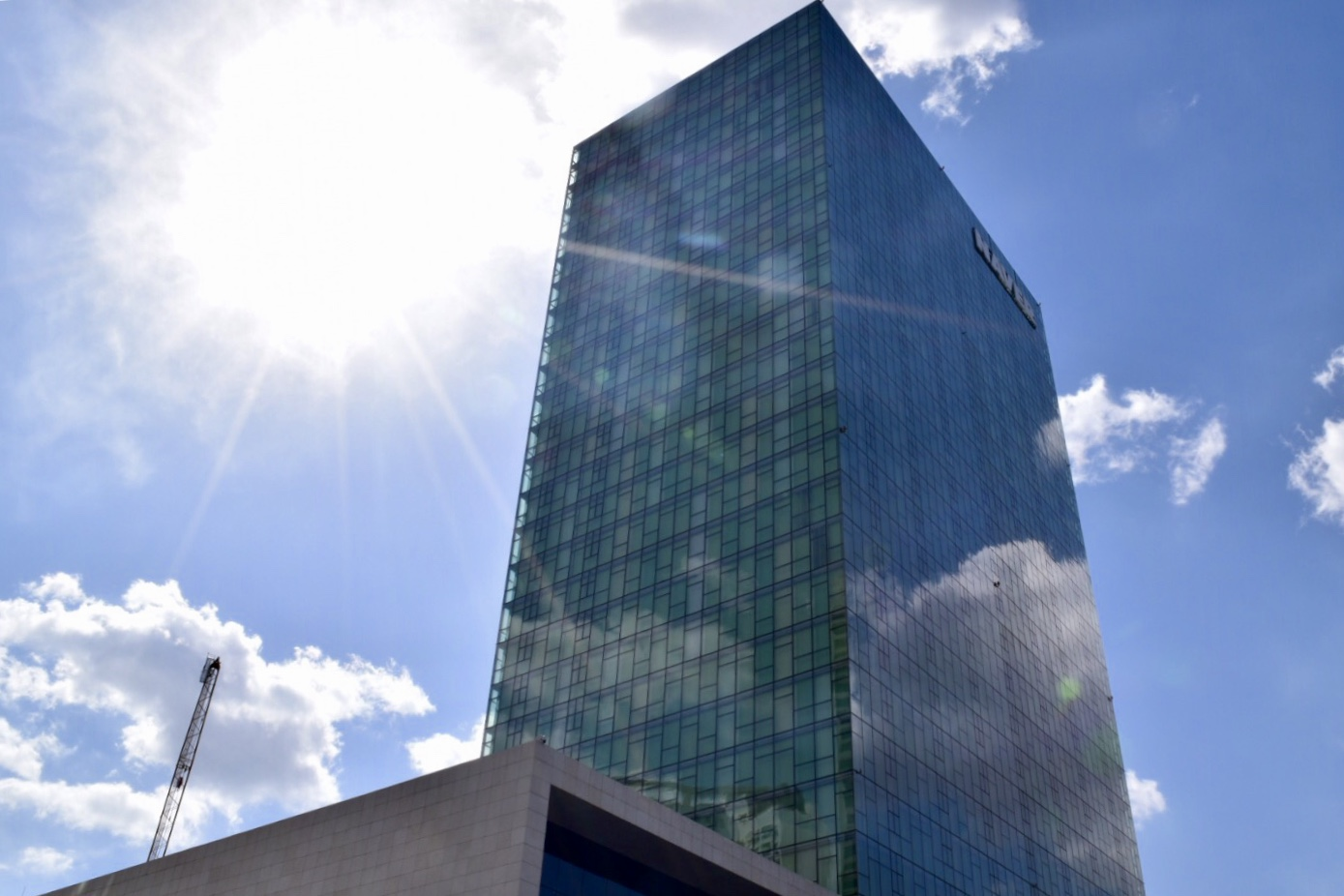
- Naver Green Factory
- Native name: 네이버 주식회사
- Romanized name: Neibeo Jusikhoesa
- Type: Public
- Traded as: KRX: 035420
- Industry: Conglomerate
- Founded: June 2, 1999; 27 years ago
- Founder: Lee Hae-jin
- Headquarters: Naver Green Factory, Bundang-gu, Seongnam, South Korea
- Key people: Lee Hae-jin (Chairman); Choi Soo-yeon (CEO); Kim Beom-jun (COO); Kim Hee-chul (CFO)
- Revenue: ▲ ₩12.04 trillion (US$8.98 billion) (2025)
- Net income: ▼ ₩1.82 trillion (US$1.36 billion) (2025)
- Total assets: ▲ ₩41.09 trillion (US$30.65 billion) (2025)
- Total equity: ▲ ₩28.95 trillion (US$21.6 billion) (2025)
- Owner: National Pension Service (9.25%); BlackRock (6.12%); Others (84.63%)
- Number of employees: 5,047 (2025)
- Subsidiaries: Camp Mobile (Snow); Poshmark; Wattpad; Webtoon Entertainment
- Website: navercorp.com

Naver Corporation (Korean: 네이버 주식회사; stylized as NAVER) is a South Korean internet conglomerate headquartered in Seongnam that operates the search engine Naver. Naver established itself as an early pioneer in the use of user-generated content through the creation of the online Q&A platform Knowledge iN.

On August 1, 2013, Naver decided to split with Hangame, a corporation with which it had grown together with as NHN Corporation for 13 years. On October 1, 2013, the company adopted its current name, Naver Corporation, in order to reflect the change, thus restoring its pre-merger name. Hangame is now overseen by NHN Entertainment Corporation. Naver's current affiliates include Snow, Naver Labs, Naver Webtoon, NAVER Cloud, and Works Mobile.

== History ==
=== 1999–2000: Establishment and launch of services ===
Naver Corporation was founded by Lee Hae-jin in 1999. Naver Corporation was first established in June 1999 under the name of Naver Comm. Along with its search engine Naver, the company also launched a service for children named Junior Naver. In July 2000, Naver merged with Hangame Communications Inc. and several other companies including Oneque and Search Solutions.

In August 2000, Naver began its 'comprehensive search' service, which allows users to get a variety of results from a search query on a single page, organized by type (for example blogs, webpages, images, cafes, etc.).

=== 2001–2012: Renaming and worldwide expansion ===
In 2001, NAVER Comm was renamed NHN Corporation (Next Human Network), although both divisions—Naver and Hangame—continued to operate under their original brand names. NHN also stood for (NAVER, Hangame, Network).

In 2002, NHN was registered on the KOSDAQ stock exchange, and launched the online Q&A service Naver Knowledge iN. In 2003, NHN merged all Japanese subsidiaries into NHN Japan. In 2005, Naver began the online donation service: Happy Bean. It also established its US branch under the name NHN USA. In 2007, it launched Naver Japan in order to pursue its search engine business in Japan. Meanwhile, NHN USA officially opened its American game service, ijji. However, it later sold away its 100% stake to Aeria Games.

In 2008, NHN appeared on the Forbes Global 2000 list for the first time. That same year, NHN had the largest market capitalization among KOSDAQ-listed companies before being transferred to the KOSPI market in November. In 2009, Kim Sang-Hun of NHN and Jing-Wan Kim of Samsung were the only South Korean CEOs to appear on Forbes' Asia's Fab 50 list.

In 2010, the company moved into its new headquarters now known as the Green Factory.

In June 2011, NHN Japan launched Line, a messaging application that quickly soared in usage. In the same year, NHN Japan, Naver Japan and Livedoor were all merged into one company: NHN Japan. In August, NHN also established its Singapore branch NHN Singapore.

=== 2013–2015: Splitting from NHN ===
In 2013, NHN launched its subsidiary companies Camp Mobile and Line Plus. NHN was split into Naver Corporation and NHN Entertainment, the latter being formerly known as Hangame. Similarly, NHN Japan separated into Line Corporation (web services) and Hangame Japan (game services). In June, Naver became the first web company in Korea to build and operate its own data center, Data Center GAK, which was built in Chuncheon, Gangwon Province.

In 2015, Naver launched Works Mobile for B2B collaboration businesses and merged with Entry Education Labs, which is a software education platform company.

=== 2016–2020: Listing and further expansion ===
Naver's annual revenue for 2016 was 4.02 trillion won. In 2016, Line Corporation was double listed on both the NYSE and the TSE. In August 2016, Naver spun off its app SNOW into a separate subsidiary company, Snow Corp. Naver also began Project Flower, a project which aims to support small businesses and creators by cooperating with them on various projects. In September 2016, Naver and its affiliate Line announced that they would invest a combined 100 million euros (US$112 million) into K-Fund 1. K-Fund 1 is a European startup accelerator fund operated by Korelya Capital, which is an investment firm established by Fleur Pellerin, the Korean-born former French minister overseeing small and medium enterprises in the digital economy.

In 2017, Naver established its subsidiary companies Snow, Naver Labs, and Naver Webtoon. Naver opened Space Green, which is a startup space inside Station F, a startup incubator space located in France. Naver also acquired Xerox Research Centre Europe, located in the French city Grenoble, rebranding it as Naver Labs Europe.

In 2018, Naver launched Naver Z Corp, a division that focuses on the Metaverse. Naver Z also launched the online game platform Zepeto the same year.

=== 2021–present: Global expansion ===
In mid-January 2021, Naver announced the acquisition of Wattpad for US$600 million.

In March 2021 Line Corporation merged with Yahoo Japan, which has been operated by Z Holdings, a SoftBank Group subsidiary. Under the new structure, Naver and SoftBank Corp., which is the wireless carrier unit of SoftBank Group, each hold 50 percent stakes in a new company named A Holdings Corp., which holds a majority stake in Z Holdings, which will operate Line and Yahoo Japan. Upon integrating the two businesses and creating further platforms, the merged company aims to compete with the U.S. tech giants Google, Amazon, Facebook, and Apple and the Chinese tech giants Baidu, Alibaba, and Tencent, as well as the Japanese e-commerce giant Rakuten. The merger also gives Z Holdings three additional Asian markets where Line is popular: Taiwan, Thailand, Indonesia, and Malaysia.

In May 2021, Naver partnered with CJ Group’s CJ ENM to acquire Munpia Inc, the third largest web-novel platform in Korea.

In October 2022, Naver agreed to buy social commerce marketplace Poshmark for a total enterprise value of US$1.2 billion, which finalized in January 2023.

== Products and services ==
Based on the influence of its core search engine service, Naver has also developed new business models in online advertisement, content, and deep-tech through research and development.

=== Search engine ===
Naver was the first Korean web provider to develop its own search engine. It was also the first operator to introduce the comprehensive search service (which refers to optimized search results from various categories such as news, maps, images and so on, presented on a single page). The search engine has since grown to offer a variety of related services including e-mail, mapping, e-commerce, social media, wireless payments, and online streaming.

==== Junior Naver ====
Junior Naver, also known as Juniver, is a children's search service that began in 1999. Junior Naver provides various services for children of each age range, such as Pororo Play Time (educational content for aged 3~5), Pany's Room (decoration simulator using Pany Pang characters), Children's song world, and Children's story world—as well as a Disney Zone for Disney Channel shows and animations. The application and the mobile version were each launched in 2011 and 2012 in order to provide contents in streaming form rather than having to download them. Junior Naver also operates a parental monitoring system that blocks harmful or inappropriate information. Meanwhile, Junior Naver's "Gameland" service was officially terminated in February 2019.

The service sunsetted on May 27, 2025.

==== Knowledge iN ====
In 2002, Naver set up one of the first Q&A webpages, Knowledge iN. The service allows users to post questions on any subject, and select from answers submitted by other users, points are awarded to users with the most helpful answers.

Knowledge iN also offers an Open Dictionary function, which is a database of informative articles generated by users. Users can create an article on their own, or enable other users to collaborate by creating a thread of articles on the same subject. There is also an 'Ask an Expert' category where licensed doctors, veterinarians, pharmacists, lawyers, tax accountants, and labor attorneys answer users' questions. As of May 2016, Knowledge iN had 100 million questions, 200 million answers.

==== Cafe and Blog ====
Naver Cafe and Blog are user-generated content (UGC) platforms where users post specialized contents on various themes. Cafe allows users to create communities on various topics, and Blog gives any user the chance to manage their own personal blog. There were 10.5 million Naver Cafes running in May 2017, making Naver the most visited Cafe platform in the country. 800,000 new contents are generated every day in 23 million Blogs and 10 million Cafes.

==== Dictionary and Encyclopedia ====
Naver Dictionary supports 34 categories, including English, Korean, Chinese, Chinese characters, Japanese, Global Communication, Vietnamese, Uzbek, Indonesian, Thai, Arabic, Khmer, Tamil, Mongolian, Hindi, Persian, Nepali, Swahili, French, German, Spanish, Russian, Italian, Latin, Portuguese, Turkish, Georgian, Albanian, Ukrainian, Romanian, Dutch, Swedish, Hungarian, Polish, and Czech as of May 30, 2017. It has the most languages among Korean dictionaries. Handwriting recognition is supported in Japanese and Chinese characters. Naver is also investing 10 billion won for the development of language dictionaries for five years beginning from 2016.

Naver Encyclopedia functions consist of a professional database with over 3 million entries from many different encyclopedias.

=== V Live ===
V Live was a global live streaming platform with videos and contents ranging from concert broadcasts to V originals (for example, real-time private shows for celebrities). There was also a subtitle service called V FANSUB which allows users to insert their own foreign-language subtitles to the videos. The subtitle feature had attracted a large number of foreign viewers, as K-pop is gaining popularity in other countries. On January 27, 2021, it was announced that they would invest ₩354.8 billion ($321 million) in Hybe's technology subsidiary, Weverse Company Inc., acquiring 49% of the company. In return, the corporation would transfer its V Live streaming service to Weverse Company on March 2, 2022. It was shut down after merging with Weverse on December 31, 2022.

=== Naver Papago ===
In July 2017, Naver launched Papago, which is an AI-based mobile translator that uses a large neural network technology named N2MT (Naver Neural Machine Translation). It can translate text and phrases in 15 different languages (Korean, English, Japanese, Chinese (Simplified), Chinese (Traditional), Spanish, French, German, Russian, Portuguese, Italian, Vietnamese, Thai, Indonesian, Hindi) by analyzing context instead of statistical analysis.

=== Naver Pay ===
In June 2015, Naver launched its own payment service, Naver Pay, which allows mobile payment service and online checkout.

=== Naver TV ===
Naver TV (Previously known as Naver TV Cast) is a web broadcast network which provides web dramas distributed by Naver as well as user created content with videos and live streams.

=== Naver NOW. ===
Naver NOW. is a streaming service available through Naver's app, that streams music and radio shows live 24-hours a day.

=== Naver Webtoon ===
In 2004, Naver Corporation launched its online comic service Naver Webtoon, which is now one of the largest Korean Webtoon platforms. The service promotes a distinct infinite canvas layout as well as a weekly update system, and has gained a large amount of traction beginning from the late 2000s. The service received more than 6 million hits per day from unique visitors and had accumulated more than 29 billion total visits as of June 1, 2014. In July 2014, Naver launched a global version of the service under the name of Line Webtoon. The userbase of Line Webtoon grew rapidly after the service was released globally, with 65 million users per month, 18 million among them being foreign users. Line Webtoon showcases approximately 870 works in seven languages: English, Mandarin, Cantonese, Taiwanese Indonesian, Thai, Spanish and French. Various movies, Korean dramas, animated series, and video games have been produced based on Naver webtoons. According to JunKoo Kim in 2014, "a total of 189 books, videos and games based on [Naver] webtoons ha[d] either been produced or [were] in the process of being made." Well-known works include The Sound of Your Heart, which was developed into a web series of the same name, Noblesse, and Tower of God. Fashion King and Cheese in the Trap were also each adapted into a film and television series respectively. In 2017, Naver split off its webtoon business into the subsidiary Naver Webtoon, which is also known by its alternative name Line Webtoon in foreign markets. In addition, Naver Webtoon also manages a web-novel section specializing in online genre-novels since 2013.

=== Naver Whale ===
In October 2017, Naver officially released the PC version of Whale, its omni-tasking web browser supporting diverse features using AI technologies. Naver had been developing Whale for 5 years and had released a beta version in March.

=== Clova ===
Clova is an AI platform integrating speech and image recognition and artificial neural network translation to provide an interactive engine. Clova is being integrated into Naver and Line services, Naver's smart speaker WAVE and Friends, smart display FACE, and other third-party devices.

=== Band ===
BAND, CAMP Mobile's first app released in August 2012, is a closed type of social network where groups can be formed according to type and purpose. The app has more than 80 million downloads with global users accounting for 30% of the user base, and currently supports 10 languages in over 168 countries. Band Game was also released in May 2014 to provide a competitive platform for both users and game companies.

=== Grafolio ===
Grafolio is a creative community space where artists can share their artworks.

=== Naver Vibe ===
Naver Vibe is a music streaming service developed by Naver Corporation. Unlike Naver's other music service, Vibe relies on artificial intelligence to curate music, recommending songs based on the sound of the songs that users are listening to rather than what's popular on charts like Naver Music.

== Subsidiaries ==
=== CAMP Mobile ===
CAMP Mobile was established in March 2013 and focuses on developing mobile services. While it originally began as a small venture project, Camp Mobile launched over 10 different apps in areas such as utilities, social networking, and e-commerce within four months of its establishment.

In 2012, the company launched its first app, Band, a social network application.

In 2015, the company also presented Watchmaster, an app that allows users to select their own smart watch home screen.

In November 2017, it was announced that Camp Mobile would be merged back into Naver Corporation in February 2018.

=== SNOW ===
SNOW Corporation develops a photo and video application called SNOW, which is considered somewhat similar to Snapchat, since both apps suggest video as an alternative communication tool rather than text. SNOW first began in September 2015 as a guerrilla project in CAMP Mobile, but has spun off into its own company as of 2016 in order to give more focus to the global visual communication market. SNOW allows users to take pictures or videos (of a maximum duration of 10 seconds) and choose from 1,300 stickers and 50 filters. They can also send them as messages that destroy themselves in 48 hours. The application has over 200 million users, mainly consisting of teenagers in Asian countries.

The firm is led by CEO Kim Chang-wook and its office is located in Pangyo, South Korea with approximately 200 employees.

=== Naver Labs ===
NAVER LABS Corp. is Naver's R&D subsidiary developing future technologies in areas such as autonomous driving and artificial intelligence with the goal of achieving Ambient Intelligence. It first began as an R&D division within Naver in 2013, and was officially established in Pangyo in January 2017 with CEO Song Chang-Hyeon. Naver Labs has been working in areas such as Papago (an AI-based translation app), Whale (an omni-tasking browser), and robots. Products include the autonomous robot Around, the in-vehicle information and entertainment platform Away, as well as an autonomous vehicle project.

==== Naver Labs Europe ====
In August 2017, Naver Labs acquired Xerox Research Center Europe (XRCE) for an undisclosed amount and renamed it. Naver Labs Europe is the biggest industrial research center in Artificial Intelligence in France.

=== Naver Cloud ===
NAVER Cloud Corporation provides services for Naver and its subsidiaries. NAVER Cloud has launched a cloud service called Naver Cloud Platform, and has also created a Data Center called GAK, which was a first for a domestic internet operator.

=== Works Mobile ===
Works Mobile Corporation provides a cloud-based office service called Line Works for B2B purposes. Functions include mail, calendar, address Book, N-drive, and web-office. Works Mobile has users mainly in Korea and Japan, but also targets the global B2B market.

=== Studio N ===
Studio N is the production company founded by Naver Webtoon in 2018 to produce original drama series based on their Korean webtoon IPs. Its shows include Hell Is Other People, Pegasus Market, and Sweet Home.

== Projects and foundations ==
=== Deview ===
Deview is a conference hosted by Naver since 2008, where developers from various countries share their technical knowledge and experience. Through several dozens of sessions, participants share in-depth knowledge in fields such as web, mobile, AI, big data, deep learning, robotics, and more. In 2017, 2,500 tickets went out in 15 seconds.

=== Cultural Foundation ===
Naver Cultural Foundation, officially established in 2009. In 2010, the Naver Cultural Foundation launched a support program for indie musicians. In November of the same year, the foundation opened an online platform called 'Onstage' to introduce new up-and-coming indie bands.

=== Connect Foundation ===
Connect Foundation is an independent nonprofit organization established by Naver in 2011. It promotes the dissemination of IT education as well as basic science and engineering education projects. Programs include public online classes, software training, math/science education, and design courses. In September 2017, Naver announced plans to donate 7 billion won (6.2 million dollars) to the Connect Foundation. As a result, Naver's total amount of donations to the Connect Foundation accumulated to 12 billion won (10.6 million dollars).

=== D2 Startup Factory ===
D2 Startup Factory (D2SF) is an investment project that was launched in May 2015. As of 2017, it has invested in 16 start-ups with notable technical skills in areas such as AI, hardware, VR/AR and IoT. For example, in August 2017, it announced its investments in AI startups Furiosa AI, Deepixel, and CrowdWorks. In September of the same year, D2SF held a Demo Day where it presented four start-ups that they were also investing in: Buzzmusiq (social visual playlist platform), Elice (online education platform for coders), Widevantage (producer of smart pens for iPad), and The Wave Talk (technology that automatically filters bacteria and drains contaminants from running water). In June 2020, it invested in Vueron Technology which provides LiDAR perception software for autonomous driving and Advanced driver-assistance system(ADAS), and QSTAG providing a self-health monitoring platform.

=== Project Flower ===
In 2016, Naver launched Project Flower, the company's long-term project to provide platform services that small enterprises and content creators can use. As a business and content platform, Naver has 1.6 million local businesses, more than 400 professional webcomic authors, 150 web novel writers, 10,000 illustrators and 3,300 indie musicians. By providing more support for small businesses, the company said that it aims to attract more than 10,000 new small businesses to its platform every year and predicts that over 1,500 of them will earn more than 100 million won each in annual sales. For content creators, Naver has expanded the application of its illustration content platform Grafolio to include not only illustrations but also photography, design, art and background music. It also holds original content exhibitions and events such as Creators' Day. Naver also diversifies the income structure of content creators by matching them with investors through crowdfunding and by connecting them to digital content marketplaces.

== Corporate affairs and culture ==
=== Employees and culture ===
As of 2021, Naver had 4,595 employees, excluding subsidiaries. In 2014, Naver was awarded the Presidential Award for Excellent Enterprise in equal employment division by the ministry of Labor.

=== Green Factory ===
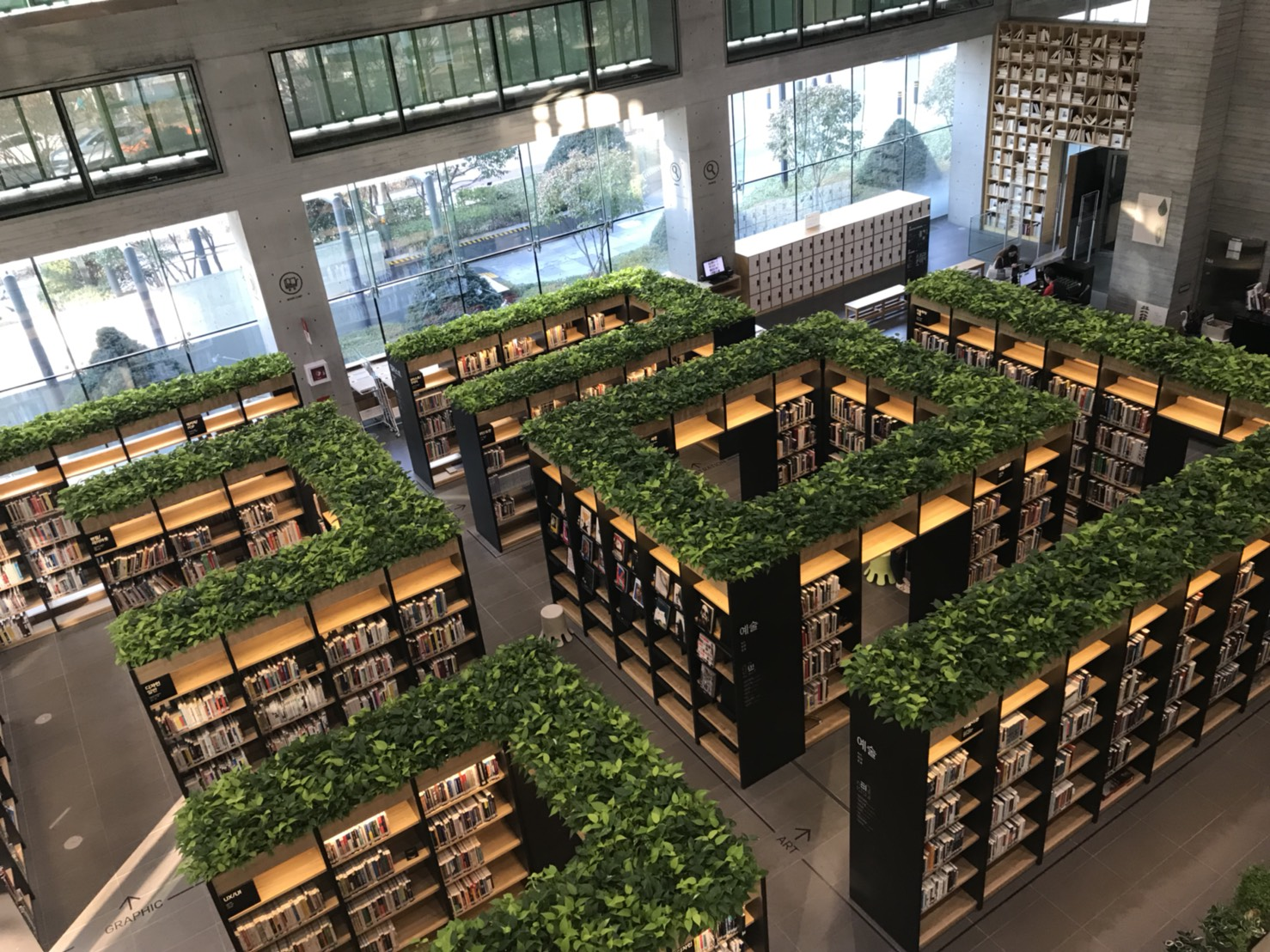
Green Factory Library

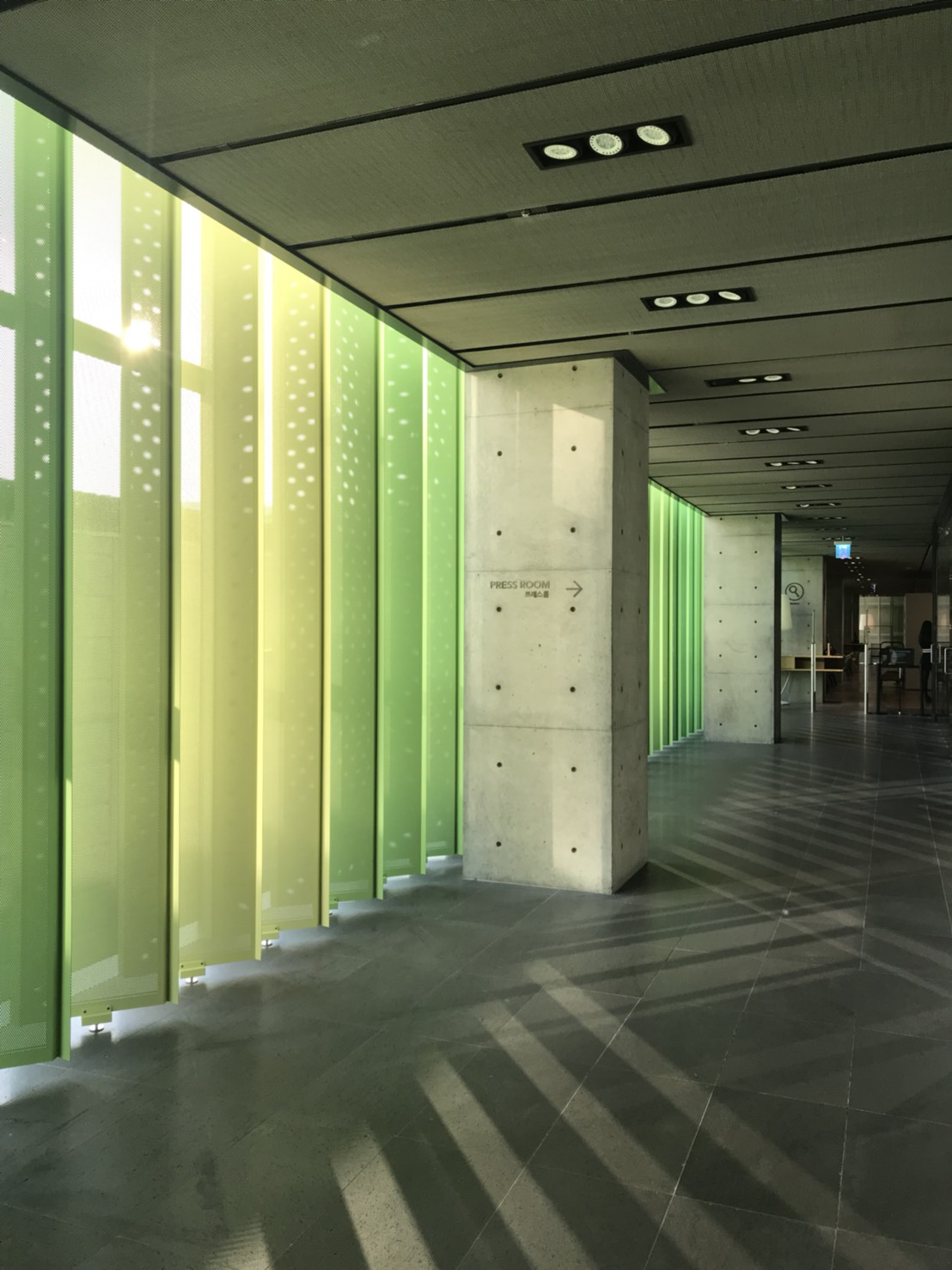
Green Factory Louvers

Naver's headquarters, located in Bundang-gu Seongnam-si of South Korea, is referred to as the Green Factory.

The construction of the Green Factory was completed in March 2010 with 27 floors above ground and 7 floors underground.

The steel and glass façade houses adjustable vertical louvers which restrict or allow sunlight to enter the building. The louvers are automatically closed and opened at times of sunrise and sunset, allowing the building to save energy. On special occasions, the façade displays different images such as the company's logo. Internal light is selectively blocked by a nocturnal automated louver system.

The building is certified as 'Platinum' under the global green building design rating system LEED.

=== Global offices ===
Naver currently has offices in Israel, US, France, China, Vietnam, Taiwan, and Indonesia.

== See also ==
- Naver
- LY Corporation
- Line (application)
- NHN Entertainment Corporation
- Map platforms in South Korea
