= Phoenix Island Villa Condo & Club House =

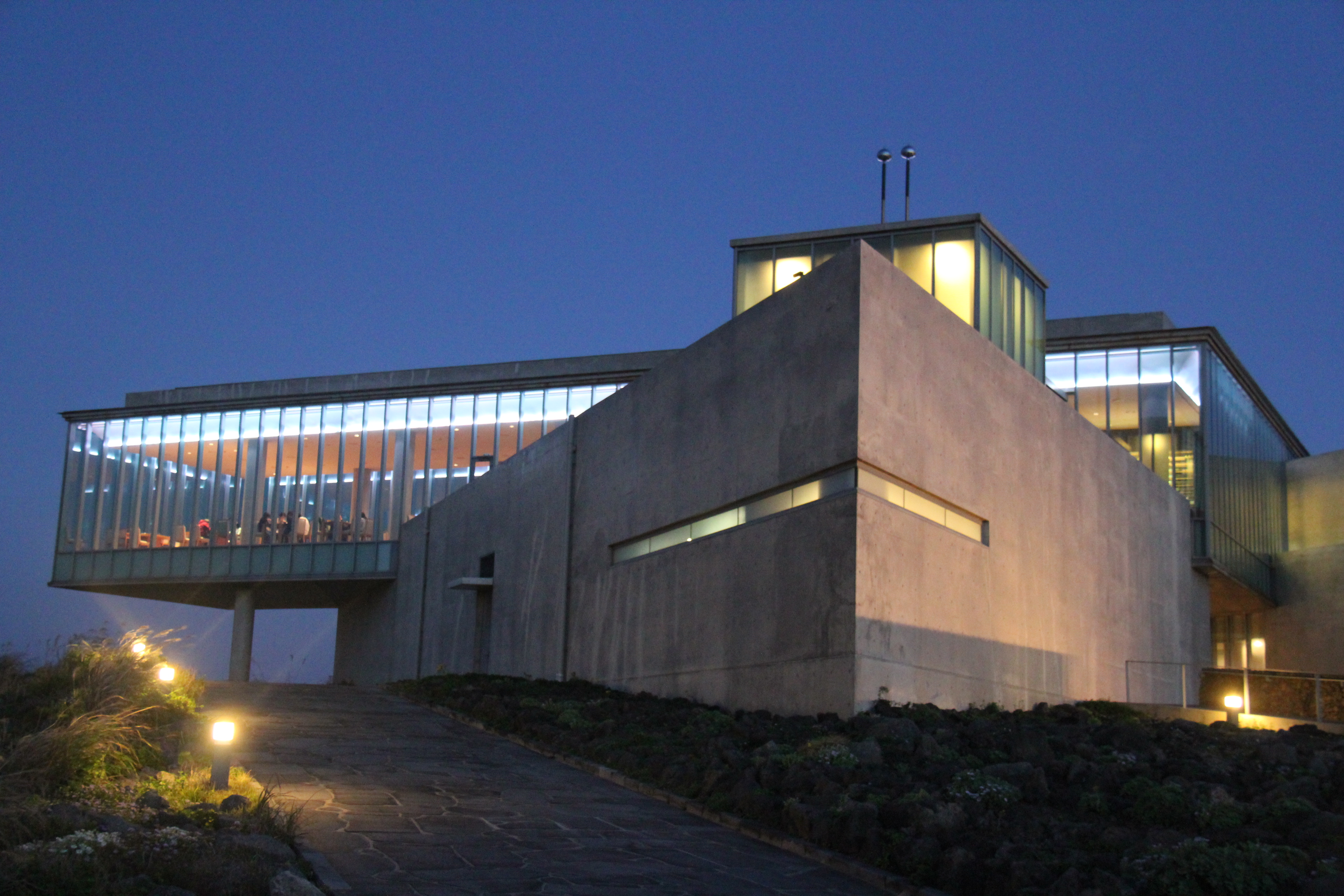
- Glass House

General information
- Location: Seopjikoji 127-2, Kosun-ri, Sungsan-eub, Seo Gwi Po City, Jeju Self-governing Province, South Korea
- Opened: 2008

Design and construction
- Architects: Head Architect: Myung-gi Sohn, Tadao Ando, Mario Botta
- Architecture firm: Samoo Architects & Engineers, Tadao Ando Architect and Associates, Mario Botta Architetto
- Awards: 2009 MIPIM Award in the Hotels and Tourism Resorts Category, 2011 Red Dot Award Honourable Mention

Website
- Official website

Phoenix Island Villa Condo & Club House is an ocean resort complex located in Seopjikoji on the eastern coast of Jeju Island. Glass House, designed by Tadao Ando, houses the Parang-i gallery. Ando also designed Genius Loci, home of the resort’s meditation hall and media art zone. Mario Botta designed the glass pyramid-shaped Club House Agora.

== Sustainability ==
The resort developers wanted to create a sustainable complex that reflected the natural surroundings of the small peninsula and island. The use of local materials was encouraged not only for aesthetic reasons but also to create a more sustainable resort. Impermeable surface area was kept to a minimum and many of the buildings have green roofs. The villas were sited within the site’s topography in order to provide each villa and occupant a niche within the landscape and to reduce negative environmental impacts caused by the site development process. Most of the surrounding landscape and vegetation was preserved during the design and construction phases.

== Glass House ==
Glass House is one of the buildings designed for Phoenix Island by Japanese Architect Tadao Ando. Constructed mostly of concrete, glass, and steel, the minimalist structure allows an unobstructed view of the surrounding landscape.

== Genius Loci ==
Also designed by Tadao Ando, Genius Loci is composed of concrete, water, and stone, and has indigenous plant species planted within the meditation garden and outside the walls of the building. Genius Loci houses a meditation garden, meditation hall, and the resort’s media arts gallery, and is home to the Yumin Art Nouveau collection.

== Club House Agora ==
Club House Agora, or simply Agora, was designed by Swiss architect Mario Botta.

The Agora building is built of glass, steel, stone, and concrete. It houses a club house, outdoor swimming pool, and a fitness room. Hanging from the interior peak of the glass and steel pyramid is a 7-meter stainless steel sphere which reflects natural sunlight within the interior.

== Awards ==
- 2009: MIPIM Award in the Hotels and Tourism Resorts category
- 2011: Red Dot Award Honourable Mention
