= Snow (app) =

Photo messaging application

SNOW
- Original author: Camp Mobile
- Developer: SNOW Corp.
- Stable release: ; iOS 8.2.6 (May 3, 2019; 6 years ago) Android.8.2.3 (April 17, 2019; 6 years ago) [±]
- Operating system: Android iOS
- Available in: 9 languages
- List of languages English, Indonesian, Japanese, Korean, Simplified Chinese, Spanish, Thai, Traditional Chinese, and Vietnamese
- Type: Photo sharing, Instant messaging, Video chat, Multimedia
- Website: snow.me

Snow (stylized in all caps) is an image messaging and multimedia mobile application created by Camp Mobile, a subsidiary of South Korean internet search giant Naver Corporation. It features virtual stickers using augmented reality and photographic filters. Pictures and messages sent through Snow are only accessible for a short time.

== Background ==
Snow was launched in September 2015 by Camp Mobile. The company collaborated with different Korean artists.

In 2016, the app spun off into its own company, named as Snow Corp.

In 2018, Snow Corp raised $50M from SoftBank and Sequoia China. It is reported that it plans to use the investment to develop its augmented reality and facial recognition technologies.

== Features ==
Snow allows users to take pictures or videos (of a maximum duration of 5 minutes) and choose from 1,300 stickers and 50 filters. They can also send them as messages that destroy themselves in 48 hours. Videos could also be saved as GIF files. According to Business Insider, the app functions as a clone of Snapchat.
