= Poshmark =

Social commerce website

Poshmark, Inc.
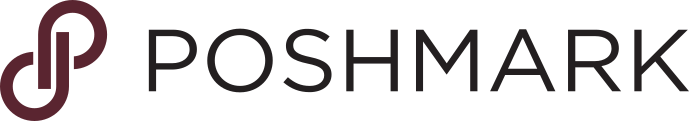
- Type: Subsidiary
- Industry: E-commerce
- Founded: May 10, 2011; 15 years ago
- Founders: Manish Chandra; Tracy Sun; Chetan Pungaliya; Gautam Golwala
- Headquarters: Redwood City, California, U.S.,
- Revenue: ▲US$262 million (2020)
- Number of employees: c. 800 (2022)
- Parent: Naver Corporation
- Website: poshmark.com

Poshmark, Inc. is a social commerce marketplace where users can buy and sell new and second-hand fashion, home goods, and electronics. The platform has over 80 million users, and more than 200 million available listings. The company is headquartered in Redwood City, California, with offices in Vancouver, Chennai and New York City. In January 2023, Poshmark was acquired by South Korea's Naver Corporation for US$1.2 billion.

== History ==
Prior to Poshmark, Manish Chandra founded the social shopping company Kaboodle. After selling Kaboodle to Hearst in 2007, Poshmark was founded in 2011 by Chandra, Tracy Sun, Gautam Golwala, and Chetan Pungaliya in Manish’s garage.

In November 2017, Poshmark announced that it had raised $87.5 million in Series D funding, at a valuation of nearly $600 million, in venture-backed funding led by Singapore-based Temasek. Menlo Ventures, GGV Capital, Mayfield and others also participated, bringing their total to date to $160 million.

In a May 22, 2018 interview with Reuters, Poshmark's CEO and founder, Manish Chandra, stated that since Poshmark's launch, sellers on the website had earned $1 billion selling clothing and accessories. Reuters reported that "much" of these earnings were "concentrated in a group of sellers making five, six and even seven figures"

On January 14, 2021, Poshmark went public, at a valuation of over $3 billion, listed on the Nasdaq Stock Market under the symbol POSH. In October 2021, Poshmark announced its first acquisition, Suede One, a platform for checking the authenticity of sneakers.

In October 2022, South Korean internet conglomerate Naver Corporation agreed to buy Poshmark for a total enterprise value of US$1.2 billion. The acquisition finalized in January 2023.

In August 2025, co-founder and CEO Manish Chandra stepped down after 15 years leading the company. Chandra moved into a strategic role on Poshmark's board of directors.

== International expansion ==
Poshmark announced its first international expansion to Canada in May 2019. As of May 2021, there are over 2.5 million Poshmark users in Canada who have listed nearly half a billion dollars' worth of inventory.

In February 2021, Poshmark announced its expansion to Australia as part of its strategy to drive long-term growth through international expansion, starting with English-speaking countries. It later expanded into India.
