= Band (software) =

Mobile application

BAND
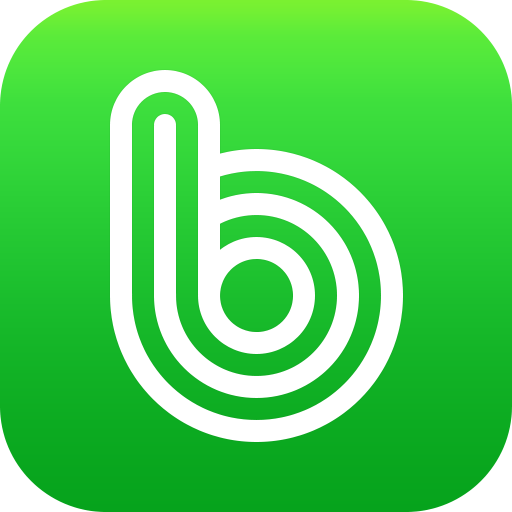
- Developer: Naver Corporation
- Operating system: iOS; Android; Windows; Mac
- Available in: English, Chinese, Korean, Japanese, Spanish, Thai, Vietnamese
- Type: Social networking services Instant messaging clients
- Licence: Freeware
- Website: band.us

Band is a mobile community application that facilitates group communication. Created by Naver Corporation, the service is available on iOS, Android, and desktop.

Users can create separate spaces for communicating with members of different groups, depending on the purpose of those groups. Types of groups include existing circles such as sports teams, marching bands, campus groups, faith groups, teams, friends, family as well as interest-based groups, like those for hobbyists, gamers, and fans, which are also searchable within the app. Band is a popular social app in Korea whose number of monthly active users surpassed that of Facebook by June 2014.

== Usage ==
Secret Bands are mostly created by pre-existing offline groups when members intend to stay connected, plan, and collaborate with each other via mobile. Examples of such groups include sports teams, clubs, classes, work teams, faith groups, organizations, and extended families. Once a member creates a group on the Band app, the member can invite other members by sharing a Band URL via SMS, messenger apps, or email. The members then can sign up on the Band app and join the group by clicking the URL.

Closed and Public Bands are created by interest-based groups, like people with common life experiences or hobbies, gamers, fans, and such.

Band launched a gaming platform in April 2014 allowing users to play games and compete with each other. In South Korea, Band has become an official communication tool in the Republic of Korea Army.

== Features ==
Users can manage their preferences for notifications to select how and if they want their mobile notifications to be received.

Band allows the group's leader to see which of the members have read the post using the "read by" feature so that users can easily track group member's participation.

== COVID-19 pandemic ==
According to Naver, as the COVID-19 pandemic spread in the United States in March 2020, Band's monthly live users exceeded 2.5 million, a 17-fold increase from 2016. The number of new groups increased by 140% and new subscribers increased by 81%. In addition, the number of groups that performed live broadcasting increased by 512% and the number of viewers increased by 886%. As remote work and distance education are becoming more common, the band is drawing attention as a remote communication tool. This is because it provides functions such as live broadcasting, attendance check, voting, and group call online.
