= Dongdaemun Design Plaza =

Urban development in Seoul, South Korea

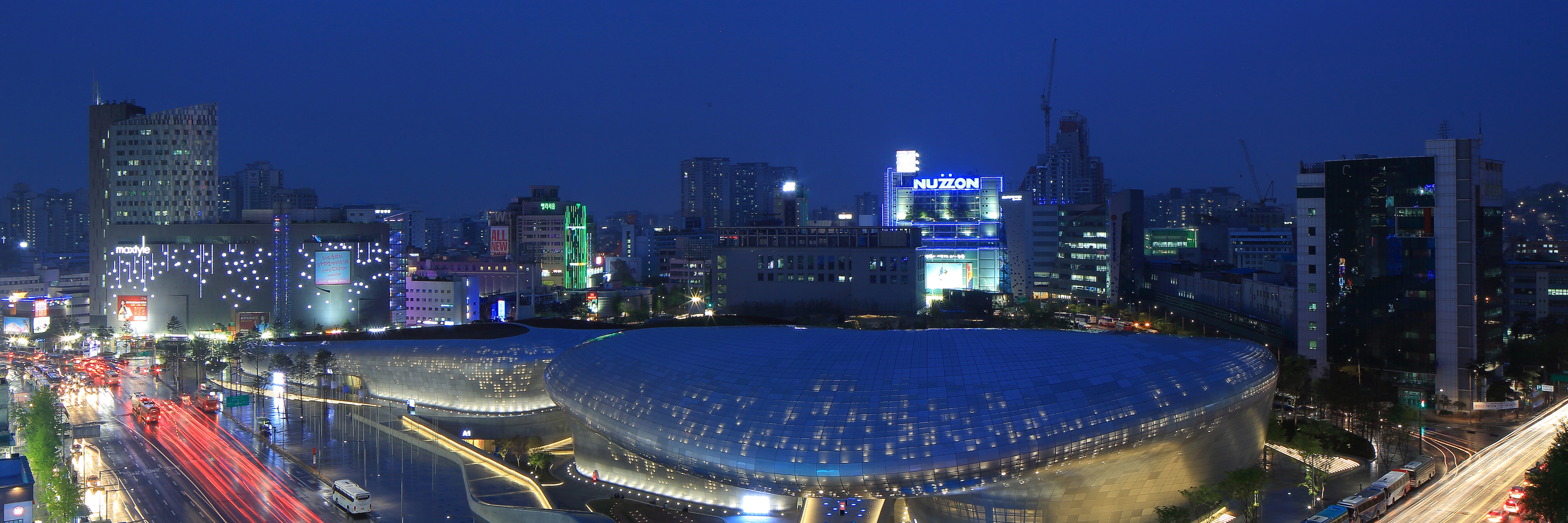
- Interactive map of the Dongdaemun Design Plaza area

General information
- Location: Dongdaemun, Seoul, South Korea
- Coordinates: 37.5669°N 127.0094°E
- Construction started: 2009
- Inaugurated: 21 March 2014
- Cost: $451 million

Technical details
- Floor area: 86,574.7 m^{2} (931,882 sq ft)

Design and construction
- Architect: Zaha Hadid
- Awards: SEGD Merit Award, 2015

Other information
- Parking: Available

Dongdaemun Design Plaza (DDP; Korean: 동대문 디자인 플라자) is a major urban development landmark in Seoul, South Korea, designed by Zaha Hadid and Samoo, with a distinctively neofuturistic design characterized by the "powerful, curving forms of elongated structures." The landmark is the centerpiece of South Korea's fashion hub and popular tourist destination, Dongdaemun, featuring a walkable park on its roofs, large global exhibition spaces, futuristic retail stores, and restored parts of the Seoul fortress.

The DDP has been one of the main reasons for Seoul's designation as the World Design Capital in 2010. Construction started in 2009, and it was officially inaugurated on 21 March 2014. It is physically connected to Seoul Subway via Dongdaemun History & Culture Park Station on Line 2, 4, and 5.

== Overview ==
The Dongdaemun Design Plaza (DDP) was designed by British-Iraqi architect Zaha Hadid, winner of the 2004 Pritzker Prize, with the concept of "Metonymic Landscape". Metonymy refers to a method of describing a specific object indirectly, and Hadid integrated historical, cultural, urban, social, and economic aspects of Seoul deduced from this method in order to create a scene of the landscape. Designed as a cultural hub in the historical district of Seoul, South Korea's largest fashion district, the DDP is composed of undulating surfaces that resemble the flow of liquid and allow flexibility in space. The state-of-the-art BIM (Building Information Modeling), mega-truss (extra-large roof truss) system, and space frame system are the key features in terms of creating grand-scale spaces. According to Hadid, the fundamental features of her design were "transparency, porousness, and durability." Many ecological features, including a double-skin facade, solar panels, and a water recycling system, are included in the building.

The construction project for replacing Dongdaemun Stadium with a public park has been discussed in the media since 2000, and the city of Seoul established a basic master plan for alternating the function of Dongdaemun Stadium in 2005. Upon the advice of architects, and in order to secure a high-quality design for the new landmark of Seoul, the city invited architects in February 2007 to participate in a design competition. The city requested that the architects include a design plaza, underground spaces, a history park, and a culture park in the project, according to the guidelines. Zaha Hadid's Metonymic Landscape won the competition.

The exterior envelope of the DDP, a smooth and giant mushroom-like structure floating above ground level, is made of concrete, aluminum, steel, and stone. The interior of the building is finished with plaster reinforced with synthetic fiber, acoustic tiles, acrylic resin, stainless steel, and polished stone in the interior.

== Main programs ==
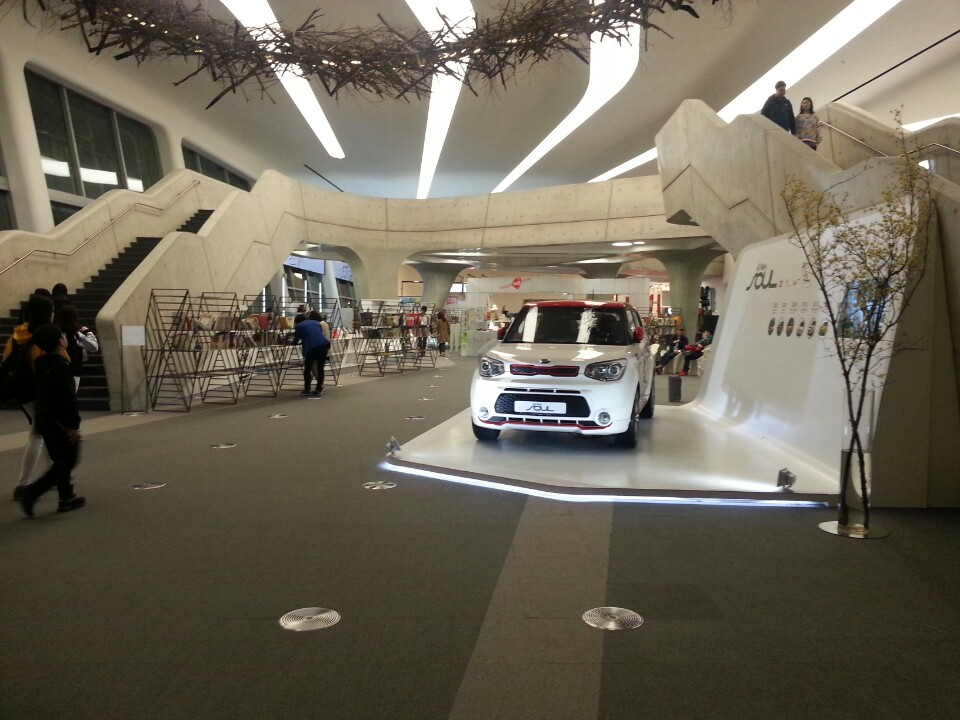
Design Lab and Kia Soul exhibition in Dongdaemun Design Plaza & Park

The DDP has three underground levels, four above-ground levels, and a main building that is 280 meters long. The building is equipped with diverse public spaces, including an exhibition hall, a conference hall, the design museum, the design lab, an academy hall, a media center, a seminar room, Dongdaemun History and Culture Park, the designer's lounge, and the design market.

The art hall operates as a space for conventions, trade shows, exhibitions, fashion shows, concerts, and performances. The museum hall consists of five sections, and allows many artists to engage in the design industry and exchange ideas. The design playground, Design Dulle-gil (trail), design museum, design exhibition hall, and the design rest area are located inside the museum hall.

The design lab operates as an incubator for budding product designers from inside and outside the country. The design market is a multipurpose space for cultural events and shopping, and is open 24 hours a day.

In addition, the DDP has parking areas, dispensaries, a feeding room, a coatroom, a cafe, and other facilities that are operated and managed by the Seoul Design Foundation of the city of Seoul.

== History ==
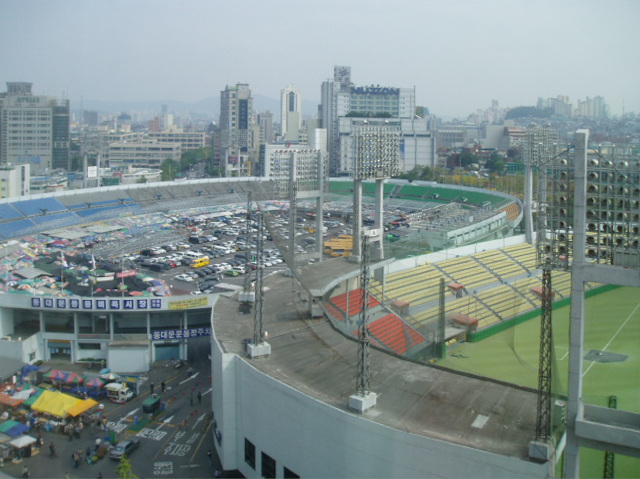
Dongdaemun Stadium Aerial View

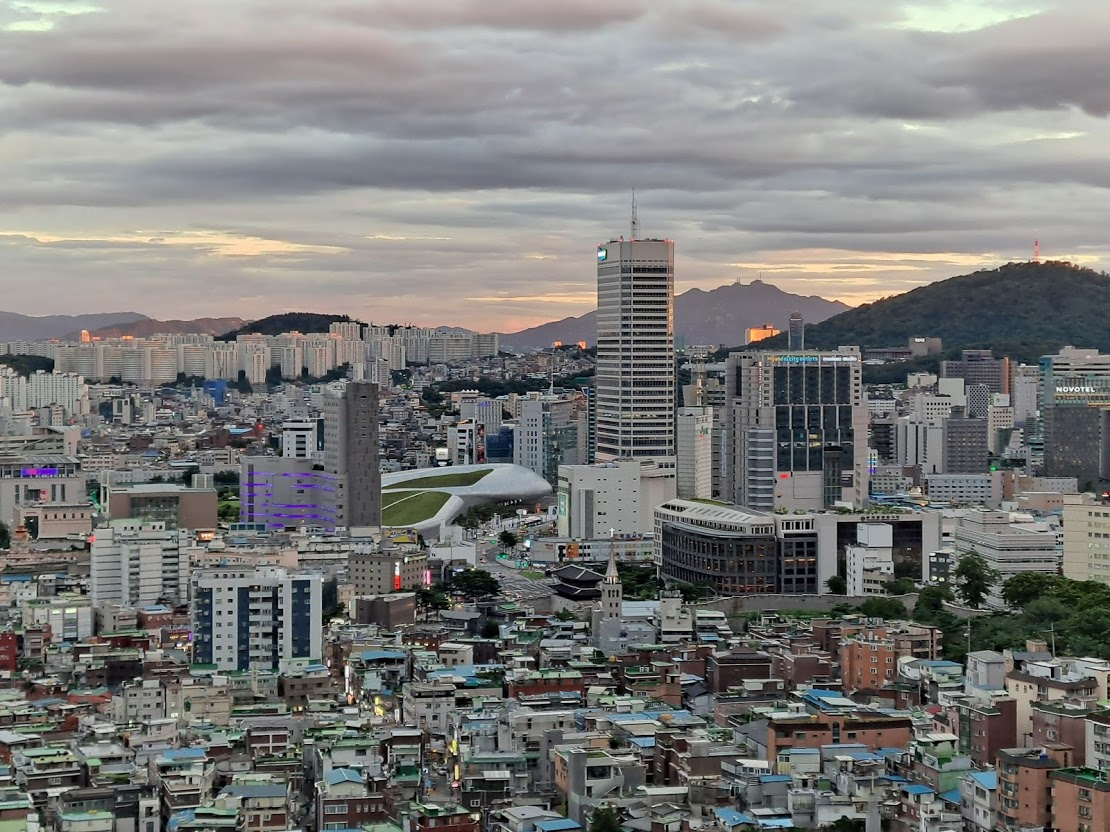
DDP surrounding area as seen from the north

Dongdaemun Stadium was the first modern stadium in Korea and was built during the Japanese Colonial Period to celebrate the wedding of the Japanese Prince. From 1925 until its demolition in 2007, various national sports and celebration events were held there. The stadium was abandoned after the Seoul Olympics in 1988 and became a local market in front of the largest fashion hub in South Korea. The demolition of the stadium is not without its critics, including those who challenge the eventual removal of street vendors as a "repressive relocation."

=== Demolition of Fortress Wall in the Dongdaemun District ===
Situated in Dongdaemun, Dongdaemun District, an ancient fortress wall, once served as a protective barrier for Hanyang, the capital of Chosun. However, the scars of war and urban expansion significantly impacted its physical integrity. In 1889, its initial damage was inflicted to make way for a trolley railway, integrating Seoul's Seodaemun and Cheongnyangni districts. In 1908, during a visit by a Japanese prince, a segment between Dongdaemun and Gwanghwamun was removed, facilitating the construction of the Gyeongseong Sports Complex—a symbol of the prince's wedding under Emperor Hirohito's reign in 1924. Illicit residential development and unsanctioned post-Korean War construction perpetuated the erosion of the wall's remaining structure.

=== Hullyeondogam and Gyeongseong Sports Complex ===
The Gyeongseong Sports Complex, constructed in 1925, underwent significant demolition of the adjacent wall and buildings, resulting in its renaming to Dongdaemun Stadium. Following Korea's independence, the first modern stadium was rebranded as the Seoul Sports Complex, becoming a notable venue for national events. Later, it was once again renamed to the Dongdaemun Sports Complex, but its utilization decreased following the construction of the Jamsil Sports Complex in preparation for the 1988 Seoul Olympics.

=== Formation and development of Dongdaemun commercial area ===
The Dongdaemun commercial area developed in the latter part of the Chosun Dynasty when people started to create an autonomous marketplace around Baeogae. Another large-scale modern market, Gwangjang Market, was formed, and the district became a constellation of various markets and small businesses. In the 1960s, a large number of sewing factories were built near Pyenghwa Market, in Dongdaemun District, and the market soon became the largest shopping district for shopping. With the addition of Miliore, a shopping mall for fashion constructed in 1998, it has become a retail area.

== Dongdaemun History and Culture Park ==
Dongdaemun History & Culture Park is located on the east side of the DDP. The park connects the round-shaped Downtown Green Field Corridor from Mt. Naksan to Mt. Namsan, and serves as a cultural space for exhibiting the historic and cultural assets of Seoul. Originally, Hadid designed this area as a design street that introduces the latest design trends, but, during the excavation and demolition process of Dongdaemun Stadium, which started in December 2007, various historical remains were found. The city of Seoul established an excavation and investigation team for a safe and detailed survey in the area. In June 2009, the city decided to preserve and exhibit the excavated remains and announced the construction of Dongdaemun History & Culture Park, which would serve as a venue for the exhibition of historical remains. The area of the park is 65,232 m^{2}, and the fortress walls of Seoul and Igansumun, two outdoor exhibition spaces, Yigansumun Exhibition Hall, Dongdaemun History Museum 1396, Dongdaemun Stadium Memorial, and Gallery MUN are the key features and facilities in the park area.

The local fashion hub district and the residential area share the park at the center, which was previously separated by Jangchungdanro-ro. In addition, because of the improvement in pedestrian walking environment after the construction of the underground walking network, the park and building serve as a new cultural space that connects many parts of the downtown area of Seoul.
