= Seoul National University Museum of Art =

Art museum of Seoul National University

Coordinates: 37.4665°N 126.9500°E

- Interactive map of the Seoul National University Museum of Art area
- Alternative names: SNUMoA

General information
- Type: Museum
- Location: SNUMoA, San 56-1, Gwanak-gu, Seoul 151-742, Seoul, South Korea
- Construction started: 2003
- Completed: 2005
- Inaugurated: June 8, 2006
- Cost: Budget: $9.7 million USD
- Client: Seoul National University Museum of Art

Height
- Height: 17.5 m (57 ft)

Technical details
- Floor area: 4,478 square meters

Design and construction
- Architecture firm: Rem Koolhaas, Office for Metropolitan Architecture, Samoo Architects & Engineers
- Structural engineer: Arup
- Other designers: Landscape Consultants: Inside-Outside, Petra Blaisse, Acoustical Engineering:TNO, Renz van Luxembourg, Lighting Consultant: Arup
- Main contractor: Samsung Construction

Website
- Main Official Website

The Seoul National University Museum of Art (SNUMoA) is a museum in Seoul National University.

== History ==
- 1995 Prof. Jong-Sang Lee proposes the establishment of the MoA and the Samsung Cultural foundation promises to fund the creation of the museum. The Seoul National University Campus Planning Committee selects the location for the future museum.
- 1996 Officials from the Samsung Foundation of Culture and Rem Koolhaas conduct a field investigation of the building’s site.
- 1997 Schematic Design Completed.
- 2004 Construction of the structure begins.
- 2005 The construction of the structure is completed.
- 2006 The Museum of Art opens on June 8.

== Exhibitions ==
The SNUMoA holds regular exhibitions of students’ work as well as work from international and domestic designers and artists.

=== 2012 ===
- Spring 2011 College of Fine arts, SNU, Ph.D. Graduate Exhibition
- Dongsangyimong
- Vogue Moment
- Magical Realism in the Netherlands: from traditional to contemporary
- Art in textbooks

=== 2011 ===
- Always on my mind: home + home
- Hanunseong- hanun Castle Exhibition
- Giuseppe Verdi dedicated exhibition
- Design noir: seven kinds of fiction for the museum
- David Hockney: 1861-1977, portfolio of four prints
- Modern Life_-315
- MoA picks 2011
- Extent- materials, light, image | Dialogue with the Present
- Omar Galicia, Seoul’s Soul
- Joyce in Art
- This Modern Western Japan
- Designers in Residence 2-based: MoA of space exploration
- Split into two streams with endless garden paths: Game + Interactive Media Art_2 Part
- MoA Invites_gijeungjeon Seoul National University Museum of Art 2011

=== 2010 ===
- A tactual map also palpable
- Five Senses
- Seoul National University College of Fine Arts graduation exhibition
- Split into two streams with endless garden paths: Game + Interactive Media Art
- Portrait of Korean War
- Bergemann exhibition
- White Spring
- Yoo Lizzy, A Retrospective of 40 Years of Metal Works
- Singwangseok – between education and creation
- Seoul National Museum of Art Video Series, MoA Cine Forum 6_gestures of healing
- Residence, Seoul National University Museum of Art designer space exploration 1st MoA

=== 2009 ===
- Jangukjin
- Spring 2009, College of Fine Arts Graduate Exhibition
- Jeonsucheon
- Drawing of the world, the world’s drawing
- 50-year journey, Gwonsunhyeong Pottery
- Dream of two kinds of art: with the Italian masters of the world print workshop meeting of 2RC
- Screw Tape Letters
- World Saving Machine

== Architecture ==
The SNUMoA was designed by Rem Koolhaas. The structure's exterior is made of U-glass which reveals the underlying structural steel framed trusses. The building is located on sloping site which the architect utilized in the final design. The museum is cantilevered on a concrete core, thus giving the appearance of lightness and floating in space. The museum is divided into four basic program areas: Operations, Educational, Exhibition, and Library. The slope of the building benefits the auditorium which has ramped seating.

== Directions ==
Once you arrive, the MoA is located to the left of the main gate of the Seoul National University Gwanak Campus. Take the subway or a bus to the main gate and walk up the staircase of the amphi-plaza which is to the left of the gate.

Transportation

- By Bus: 5511, 5512 (previously 413), 5513, 5516 and 5518.
- By Subway: Seoul National University Station, Line 2, Exit No. 3. School shuttle buses are available from this exit.

== See also ==
- List of museums in South Korea
