= Whoscall =

Caller ID App

- Developers: Gogolook Co., Ltd.
- Release: August 2010
- Operating system: Android, Windows Phone, iOS
- Available in: English, Traditional Chinese, Japanese, Korean, Indonesian, Malay, Thai, Vietnamese, Portuguese, Hindi
- Type: Caller ID, Telephone Directory, Spam Filtering, Fraud Protection
- License: Proprietary
- Website: whoscall.com

Gogolook Co., Ltd.
- Headquarters: Taipei, {{{location_country}}}
- Country of origin: Taiwan
- Founders: Jeff Kuo, Jackie Chang, Reiny Song
- Website: https://gogolook.com/en
- Launched: 24 July 2010; 16 years ago

Whoscall is a mobile application that offers caller identification services developed by Gogolook Co., Ltd., a listed company in Taiwan.

== History ==
Originally a part-time project by Jeff Kuo, Jackie Chang, and Reiny Song, the trio co-founded Gogolook with the goal of developing a caller identification system to prevent fraud. In August 2010, the first version of Whoscall was released on Google Play in several countries and attracted voluntary downloads.

In April 2014, concerns regarding Whoscall's privacy issues rose to the forefront of national attention as public figures took to the press and expressed their concerns with public records including home telephone numbers and addresses showing up on incoming calling screens. Gogolook released a statement declaring that they had never collected nor stored any personal information on their servers, let alone made them publicly available. It was subsequently discovered that the personal information of the aforementioned public figures was leaked from government servers with poor security protocols that made the information available on search engines, from which Gogolook sources some of their information.

In 2020, Gogolook, the developer of Whoscall, established its overseas office in Fukuoka, Japan.

In 2021, Whoscall launched "Smart SMS Assistant" feature. In 2022, Whoscall launched the "Whoscall Premium Group Sell" on momo shopping online.

In 2022, Whoscall collaborated with the Web3 community "Global Citizen Club" to create customized NFTs.

== Business model ==
=== Investors ===
- In 2013, Gogolook received an investment of $11.7 million from Naver Corporation, LINE’s parent company.
- In 2020, Gogolook received investment from WIN Semiconductors Corp., the largest GaAs semiconductor foundry in the world.
- In 2022, Whoscall's parent company, Gogolook, applied for IPO listing on the Innovation Board.
- In 2023, Gogolook went public on the Taiwan Innovation Board (TIB) of the Taiwan Stock Exchange (TWSE).

=== Strategic partners ===
Whoscall is also the strategic partner of several governmental agencies in their anti-fraud efforts.

Year	Type	Country	Name	Goal
2016	Memorandum of understanding	Taiwan	National Police Agency	Strengthen its anti-fraud efforts
2017	Memorandum of understanding	South Korea	Financial Supervisory Service	Anti-fraud technical exchange
2017	Memorandum of understanding	South Korea	Korean National Police Agency	Anti-fraud technical exchange
2020	Partnership	Japan	Fukuoka City Government	Joint anti-fraud efforts
2021	Partnership	Thailand	Royal Thai Police	
2022	Partnership	Thailand	True Corp	Expand anti-fraud business
2022	Partnership	Thailand	Thailand Post	Prevent fraud
2022	Cross-border cooperation	Malaysia	Government of Selangor	Expand the Southeast Asian market
2023	Memorandum of understanding	Malaysia	Royal Malaysian Police	Fraud prevention cooperation
2025	Memorandum of understanding	Philippines	Rizal Commercial Banking Corporation	Protection from online banking scamming

=== Other anti-fraud efforts ===
In 2020, Whoscall released the world’s first COVID-19 Scam White Paper. The release was covered by several media outlets.

Since 2020, Whoscall have been releasing Annual Reports focusing on latest fraud trends, scenarios and industry insights.

In 2022, Gogolook released the “Business Impersonation Report” with the Criminal Investigation Bureau.

== Awards and recognition ==
In 2017, Whoscall was chosen by Google as a successful case study on the event Google I/O 2017. In 2021, Whoscall was listed as one of the anti-fraud apps recommended by the Royal Thai Police.

Year	Organisation	Award name	Reference
2013	Google Play Taiwan	2013 Innovation Awards	
2013	Google Play	Best Apps of the Year	
2015	App Store	Best Apps of 2015	
2016	Google Play	Most Popular App	
2020	Ministry of Economic Affairs	4th Presidential Innovation Award	
