= Russian Tea Time =

- Interactive map of Russian Tea Time

Restaurant information
- Established: 1993 (33 years ago)
- Owners: Altyn and Enesh Mantyyeva
- Food type: Russo-Ukrainian
- Location: 77 E Adams Street, Chicago, Cook, Illinois, 60603
- Coordinates: 41°52′46″N 87°37′30″W
- Website: https://www.russianteatime.com/

Russian Tea Time is an Eastern European restaurant and tea room in the Loop, Chicago founded in 1993 by Ukrainian American Vadim Muchnik and his Ukrainian mother Klara Muchnik of Tashkent, Uzbekistan. It originally opened under the name Russian Tea Room, which was a trademark violation. Since 2018 the restaurant has been majority owned by Altyn and Enesh Mantyyeva of Turkmenistan. Enesh Mantyyeva had been a patron of the restaurant while a student at DePaul University. Most of the waitstaff are from post-Soviet countries. The restaurant offers afternoon tea, house-infused vodka, caviar service, and traditional dishes from the former Soviet Republics such as pozharski, piroshki, rugelach, blinchiki and pirog. Despite never being owned by Russians, the restaurant was subject to online vitriol following the Russian invasion of Ukraine.

== See also ==
- Russian Tea Room
- List of Russian restaurants
- Russian tea culture
