= Russian Samovar =

Russian restaurant in Manhattan, New York City

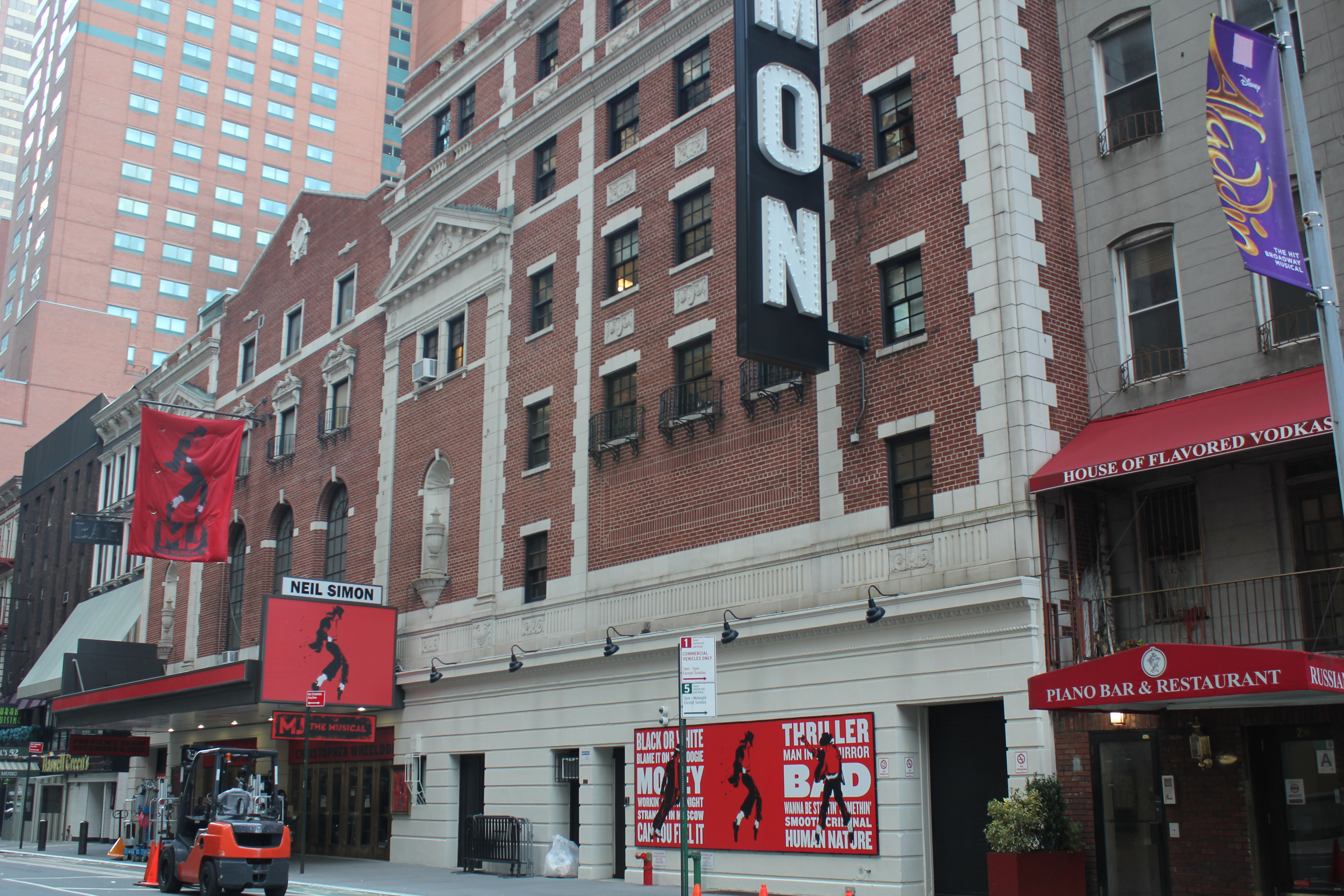
- Interactive map of Russian Samovar

Restaurant information
- Established: 1986; 40 years ago
- Location: New York City, New York, United States
- Coordinates: 40°45′47.7″N 73°59′04.8″W
- Website: russiansamovar.com

Russian Samovar is a restaurant and piano bar at 256 West 52nd Street in the Theater District of Manhattan, New York City. Opened in 1986 by the Soviet émigré Roman Kaplan, it became a meeting place for writers, artists, musicians and dancers who had left or been expelled from the Soviet Union, and is often mentioned alongside the older Russian Tea Room as one of the city's established Russian restaurants.

The poet Joseph Brodsky and the dancer Mikhail Baryshnikov became part-owners in 1987, Brodsky investing part of the money from his Nobel Prize in Literature.

== History ==
Roman Kaplan (1937–2021) was born in Leningrad and emigrated from the Soviet Union in 1972, settling in New York by way of Israel. Before entering the restaurant business he worked as a doorman and then at a Manhattan gallery dealing in Russian art. He opened Russian Samovar with his wife, Larisa, in 1986, in a Theater District building that had previously housed a bar.

The restaurant was in financial difficulty within its first two years. In October 1987 Brodsky, a friend of Kaplan's, was awarded the Nobel Prize in Literature. He and Baryshnikov subsequently invested in the business and became Kaplan's partners.

Russian Samovar Inc. filed for Chapter 11 bankruptcy protection on December 10, 2018, reporting assets of up to $50,000 and liabilities of between $100,000 and $500,000. The restaurant continued to trade. Kaplan died of heart failure on November 18, 2021, at the age of 83, at his winter home in Aventura, Florida.

== See also ==
- Russian Tea Room
