= Kruzhka =

Russian restaurant chain

Kruzhka (Russian: Кружка, lit. 'Mug') is a chain of restaurants in Moscow serving beer.

== Style ==
Kruzhka restaurants can usually be identified outside by their orange КРУЖКА signs, which are often illuminated.

=== Advertising ===
In late 2005, a television advert was created to highlight the advantages of going to Kruzhka for Russian football fans. The ad shows a Russian man excitedly returning home to watch an important match (clips show Russia's 1 - 0 victory over Wales at the Millennium Stadium which meant Russia qualified for Euro 2004). However, he finds both of the televisions in his flat are already in use; his wife is tearfully watching a soap opera, while his daughter is jumping around watching a t.A.T.u. concert. The punchline of the ad is that he can watch the match at Kruzhka.

== Menu ==
The majority of items available at Kruzhka are relatively cheap. Kruzhka attempted to cash-in on the fashion for Japanese food in Moscow by putting sushi on the menu at its Arbat Restaurant in December 2004. However, this item was removed from the menu a year later.

=== Service ===
Kruzhka are not fast food restaurants like McDonald's or KFC, nor are they self-service "cafeteria" style restaurants, which can be found at places like Kaferii and Moo-Moo and were common in Soviet times. Instead orders are taken by orange t-shirt wearing waiters and waitresses and food is served at your table. Menus are available in English as well as Russian.

== Locations ==
The first Kruzhka opened in Konkovo in April 2002. From there it spread throughout Moscow and has recently begun expanding into the Moscow suburbs. The chain now has over 20 locations. This kind of expansion has been experienced by other restaurants chains, as the popularity of eating out in Moscow has increased dramatically. Despite arguably being slightly down market of other restaurant chains such as Moo-Moo), many Kruzhka can be found in surprisingly prime locations. For example, there is one on the Arbat and another very close to Lokomotiv Stadium. In March 2006, a large Kruzhka opened at Ploshchad Revolutsii, about 200 metres from Red Square. In a move that seems targeted to the many tourists present in the area. Many Kruzhka are close to metro stations. This, together with their distinctive signs, give the restaurants a ubiquitous presence in the city.
