= List of Russian restaurants =

This is a list of notable Russian restaurants. Russian cuisine is a collection of the different cooking traditions of the Russian people. Russian cuisine derives its varied character from the vast and multi-cultural expanse of Russia. Moreover, it is necessary to divide Russian traditional cuisine and Soviet cuisine, which has its own peculiarity. Its foundations were laid by the peasant food of the rural population in an often harsh climate, with a combination of plentiful fish, poultry, game, mushrooms, berries, and honey. Crops of rye, wheat, barley and millet provided the ingredients for a plethora of breads, pancakes, cereals, beer and vodka. Soups and stews full of flavor are centered on seasonal or storable produce, fish and meats.

== Russian restaurants ==
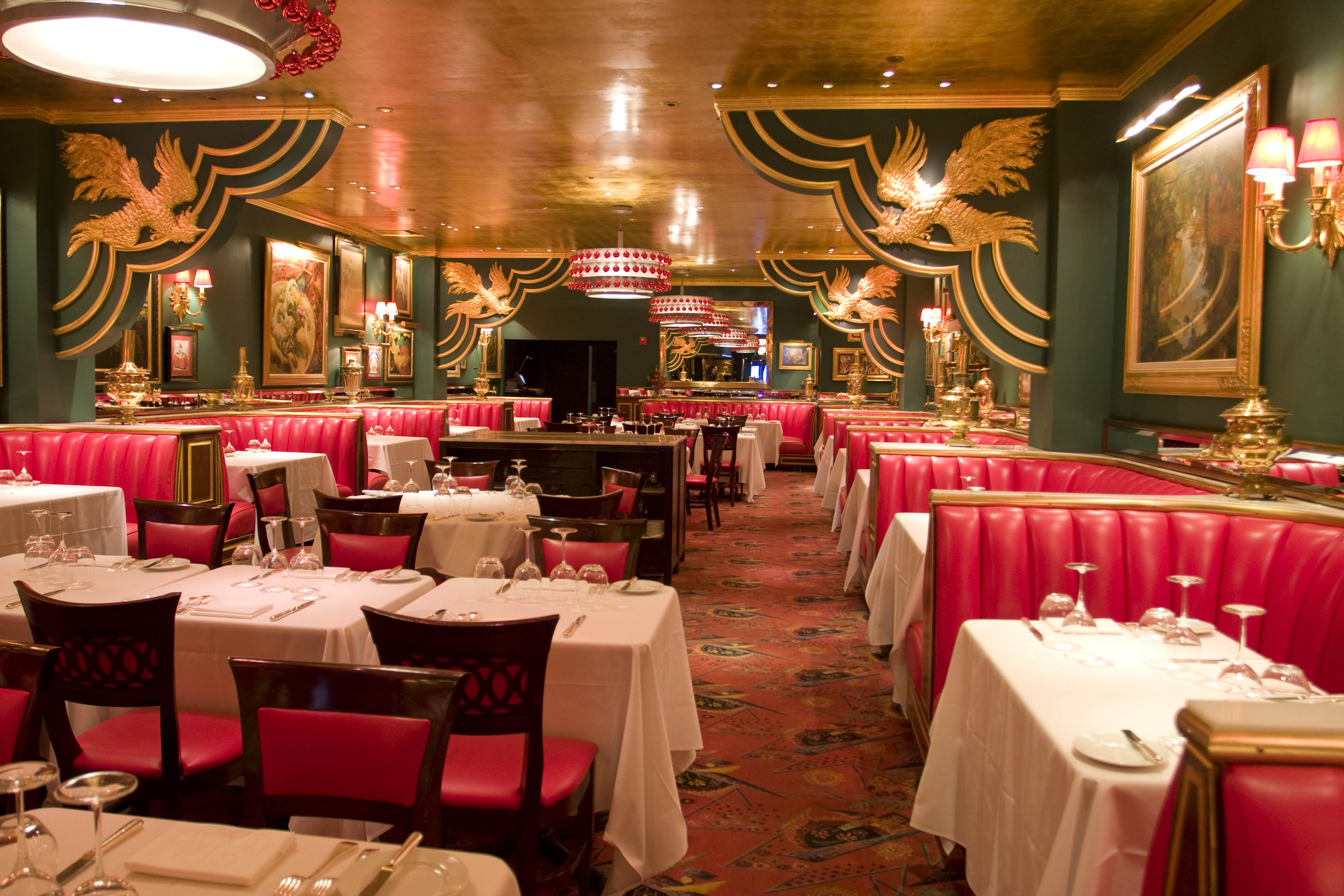
Interior of the Russian Tea Room in November 2009

- Concord Management and Consulting – Russian company
- Dacha Diner – Defunct restaurant in Seattle, Washington, U.S.
- Kachka – Russian restaurant in Portland, Oregon, U.S., Portland, Oregon
- Moo Moo Restaurant – Restaurant chain Russia
- Moscow Restaurant – Russian restaurant in Beijing
- Pinoyshki Bakery & Cafe, Seattle
- Piroshky Piroshky – Russian bakery based in Seattle, Washington, U.S.
- Probka Restaurant Group – Russian chef (born 1962)
- Red Square (restaurant) – restaurant in Las Vegas, Nevada
- Russian Tea Room – Restaurant in Manhattan, New York
- Russian Samovar - Restaurant and vodka bar in Manhattan, New York
- Teremok – Russian fast food chain

== See also ==
- List of Russian dishes
- Lists of restaurants
