= Russian Tea Room =

Restaurant in Manhattan, New York

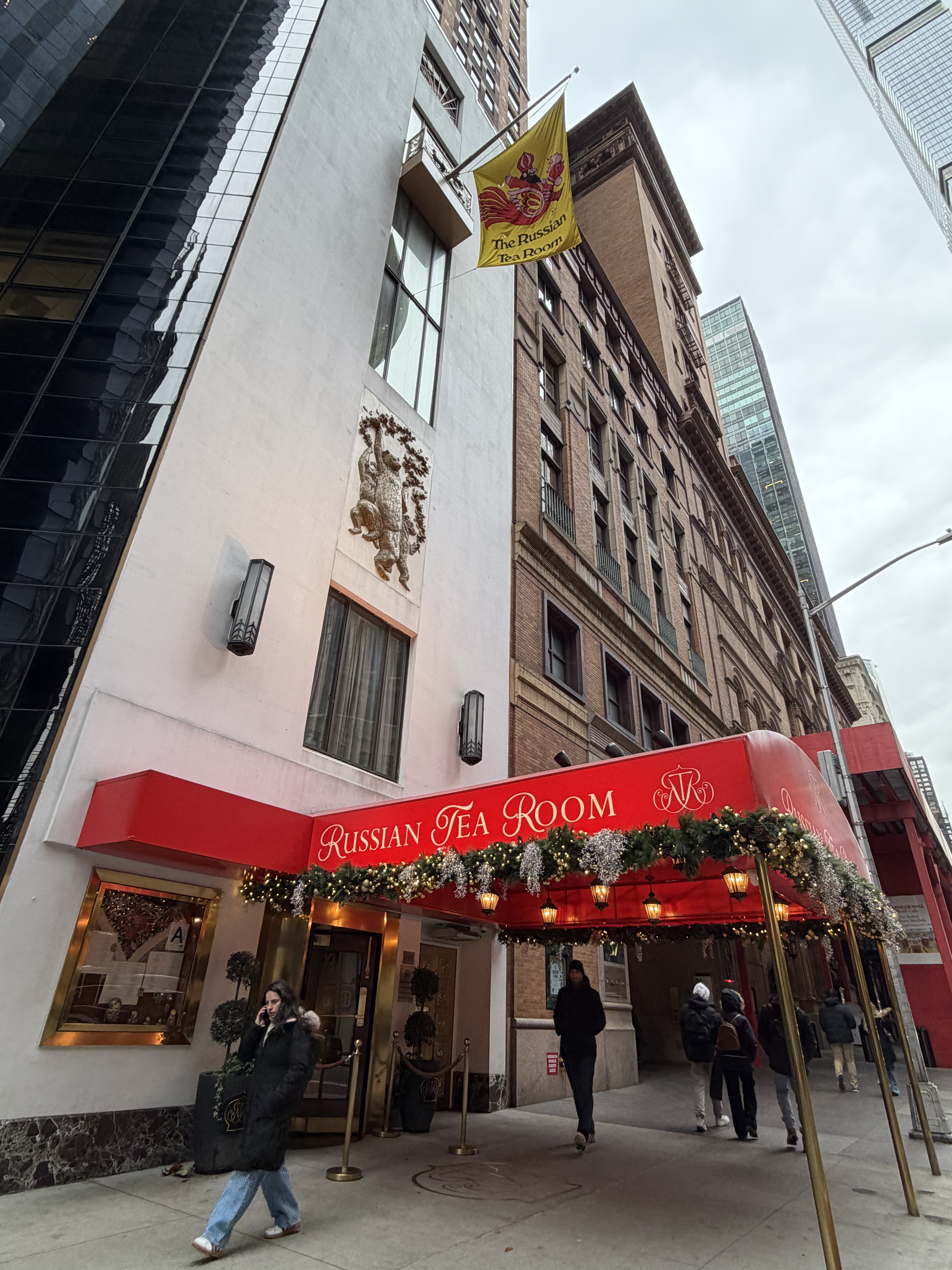
- Entrance to the Russian Tea Room in 2025
- Interactive map of Russian Tea Room

Restaurant information
- Established: 1927 (99 years ago)
- Food type: Russo-Continental
- Location: 150 West 57th Street, New York City, New York, New York, 10019
- Coordinates: 40°45′54″N 73°58′46″W

The Russian Tea Room is an Art Deco Russo-Continental restaurant, located at 150 West 57th Street (between Sixth Avenue and Seventh Avenue), between Carnegie Hall Tower and Metropolitan Tower, in the New York City borough of Manhattan.

== History ==
The Russian Tea Room was opened in 1927 by former members of the Russian Imperial Ballet as a cafe and chocolate store. At the time of its opening, the restaurant mostly served tea and catered to Russian artists, particularly ballet dancers. It became famous as a gathering place for those in the entertainment industry. The founder is often considered to be Polish-born Jacob Zysman, but in that year, a corporation directory lists Albertina Rasch as the president, and her name appears along with Russian Art Chocolate and Russian Tea Room, in early photographs of the shopfront at 145 West 57th Street.

In 1929, the business moved across the street to its present location, which at that time was an Italianate brownstone, built in 1875 by German immigrant John F. Pupke, a tea and coffee merchant, whose son later moved the large clan to Long Island, seeking a more relaxed lifestyle. By 1933, the Siberian émigré Alexander Maeef was running the Russian Tea Room and was the main personality associated with the restaurant for the next fifteen years.

A group of investors took over the Russian Tea Room in the 1940s. In 1955, the restaurant was purchased by Sidney Kaye, who grew up in the restaurant business and was a former teacher, who acquired his partners' stakes. The Russian Tea Room's clientele originally consisted largely of musical personalities. After the New York Philharmonic moved from Carnegie Hall to Lincoln Center, Kaye declined an invitation to relocate his restaurant to Lincoln Center. As such, the restaurant began to serve theatrical and film personalities, publishers, journalists, fashion designers, and artists. The Russian Tea Room was long advertised as "just six minutes and 23 seconds from Lincoln Center and slightly to the left of Carnegie Hall" because of its proximity to both venues.

=== Stewart-Gordon ownership ===
When Kaye died in 1967 at the age of 53, he left the restaurant to his widow, Faith Stewart-Gordon.

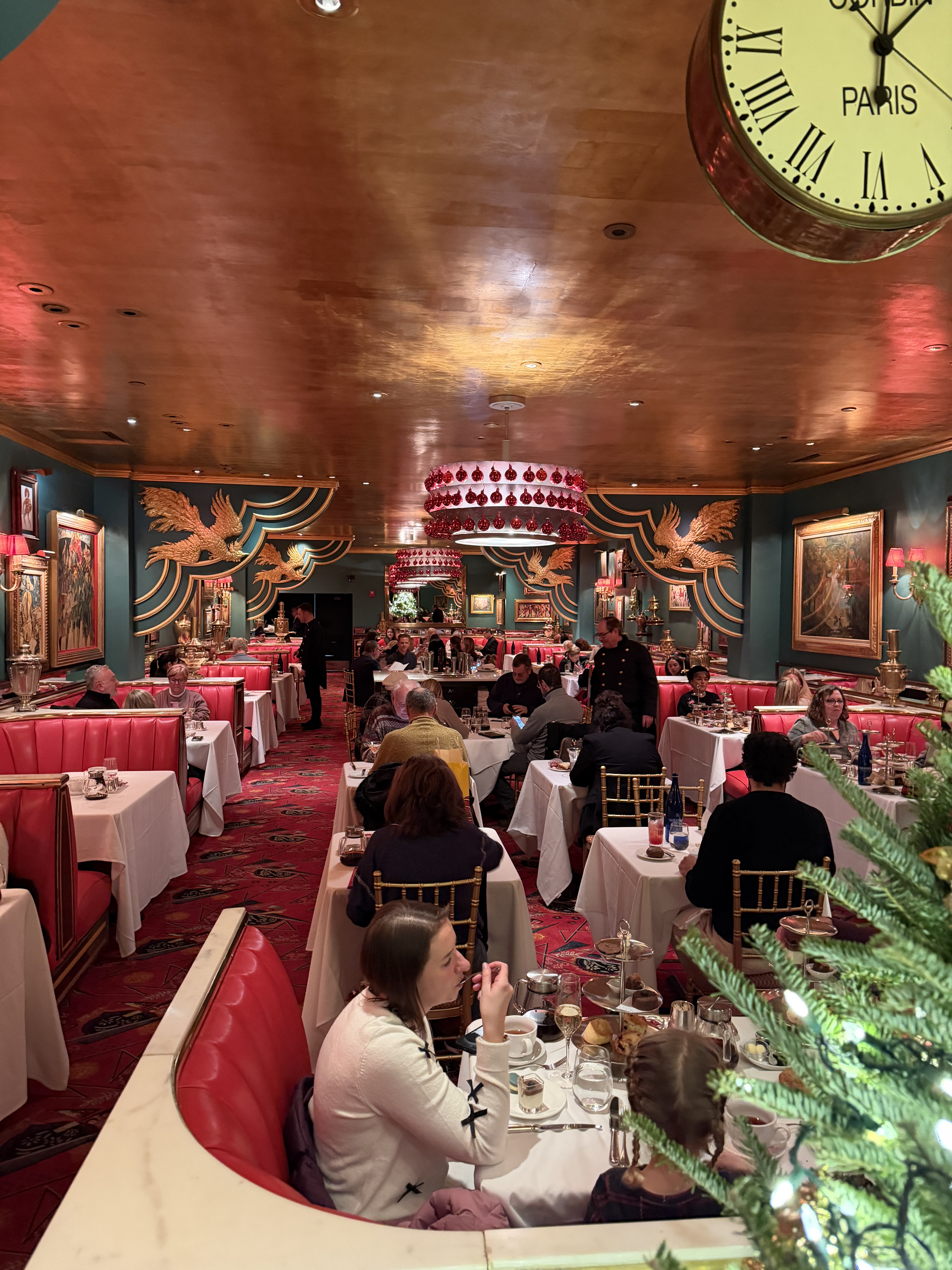
Interior, first floor

In 1981, Harry B. Macklowe, the developer of Metropolitan Tower immediately to the east, planned a large office tower that would have included the sites of the current Metropolitan Tower, Russian Tea Room, and Carnegie Hall Tower immediately to the west. If the three sites were combined, this could allow a 51-story tower with 1 million square feet (93,000 m^{2}). Macklowe had offered Stewart-Gordon $12.5 million for the building's air rights in 1982. However, Stewart-Gordon refused several offers to acquire her building, so Macklowe withdrew his bid for the Carnegie Hall Tower site in 1983. Though Stewart-Gordon subsequently considered selling the restaurant building, she ended up not selling the building or its air rights to Carnegie Hall Tower's developers. As a result, Metropolitan Tower and Carnegie Hall Tower are only separated by the Russian Tea Room, which is 20 feet (6.1 m) wide.

The Russian Tea Room began hosting cabaret performances in the mid 1990s, hosting performers such as Karen Akers, Laurie Beechman, Andrea Marcovicci, Steve Ross, and Margaret Whiting during its first season.

=== LeRoy ownership ===
Warner LeRoy, who owned Tavern on the Green, bought the restaurant in June 1995 for $6.5 million. His company LeRoy Adventures and Vornado Realty Trust, operated by Steven Roth, each obtained a 50 percent stake in the Russian Tea Room. LeRoy shortly announced plans to renovate the restaurant. At the time, the Russian Tea Room typically served 8,000 lb (3,600 kg) of beets, 2,647 lb (1,201 kg) of caviar, 43,860 lb (19,890 kg) of lamb, 15,867 lb (7,197 kg) of sour cream, and 5,884 L (1,294 imp gal; 1,554 US gal) of vodka per year. LeRoy hired David Bouley as the Russian Tea Room's executive chef in October 1995.

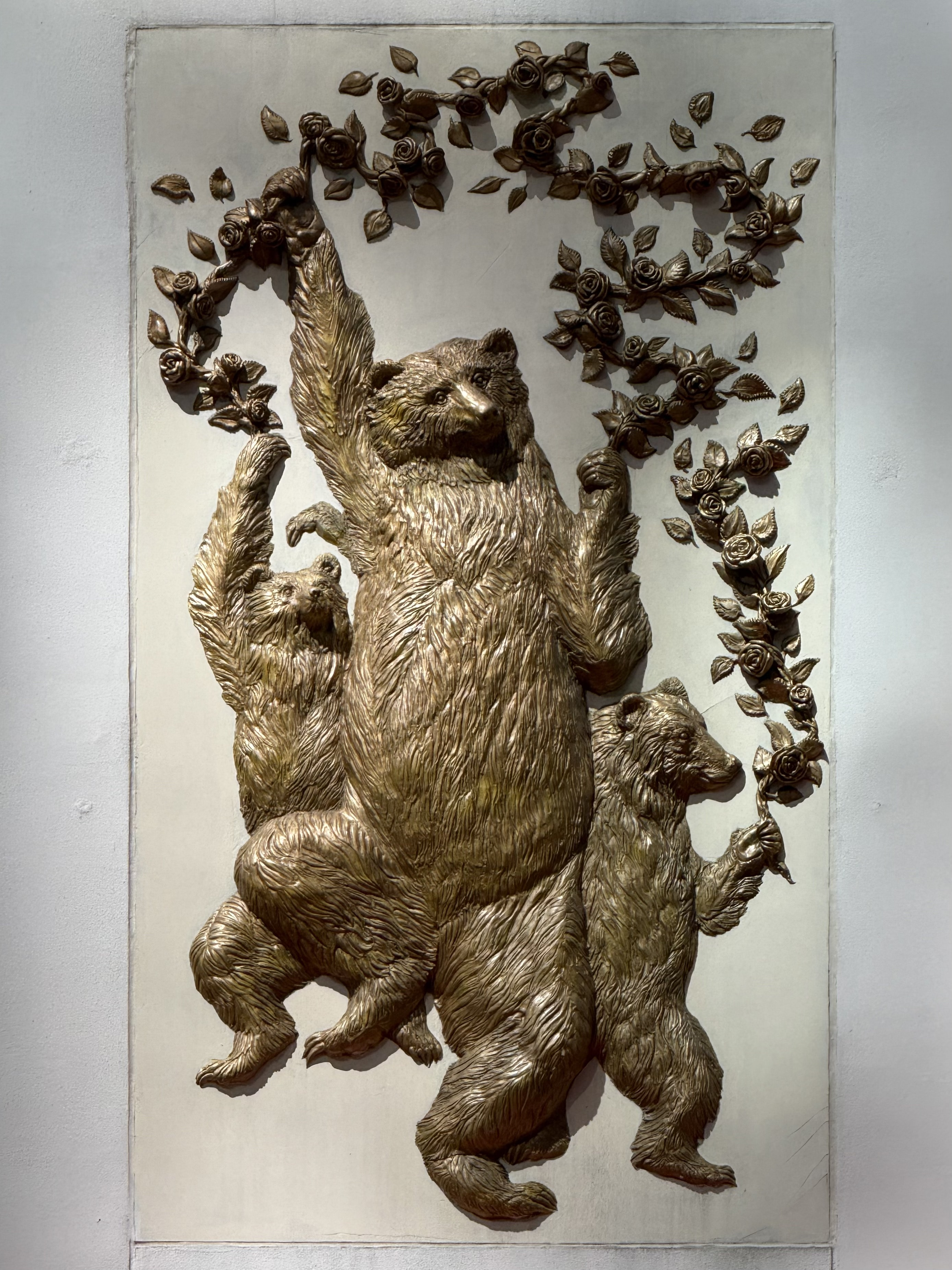
Bas relief of three dancing Russian bears on the front facade of the building

The restaurant closed for renovation on December 31, 1995. LeRoy had planned to replace the existing restaurant with a new structure costing $12 million. He hired the firm of Harman Jablin to design a seven-story structure designed in a Russian eclectic style, with features such as a large acrylic Russian bear and a replica of the Kremlin. The new structure would have contained a formal second-floor dining room, as well as banquet rooms on the third and fourth floors. Dishes, furniture, paintings, samovars, and upholstery from the restaurant were sold at auction in January 1996. Rumors circulated that LeRoy's declining health, impending divorce, and lack of funding had caused the restaurant's renovation to be delayed. By April 1997, the restaurant was scheduled to reopen in June 1998. Bouley quit in 1998 following a disagreement with LeRoy, and Fabrice Canelle was hired as the restaurant's new executive chef. The interior of the restaurant was demolished and rebuilt in late 1998. It cost $15 million to demolish the interior and more than $20 million to redecorate the restaurant.

The Russian Tea Room reopened in October 1999. LeRoy indicated that the average customer would spend $45 on a meal; the cheapest items cost $20, and the Russian Tea Room did not enforce a formal dress code. By then, LeRoy's health was failing, and his company could not make payments on the substantial loans for the renovations. The restaurant's management had initially set a sales goal of $26 million during 2000 before lowering the goal to $22 million; ultimately, the restaurant only earned $17 million that year. Following several negative reviews of the Tea Room, LeRoy fired Canelle in April 2000 and promoted Renaud LeRasle, the Tea Room's chef de cuisine, to executive chef. LeRoy claimed that Canelle's work had declined after The New York Times wrote a negative review of the restaurant.

Warner LeRoy died in February 2001, and his 22-year-old daughter Jennifer, the restaurant's director of operations, took over the Tea Room. Crain's New York and Nation's Restaurant News wrote that Warner's death caused the restaurant to decline even more, as his energetic showman personality had attracted guests. The restaurant's high overhead expenses made it difficult to turn a profit. Business, which was already slow after the Tea Room reopened, never recovered from the September 11 attacks. During the fourth quarter of 2001, Vornado wrote off its $7.374 million stake in the Tea Room. The Russian Tea Room closed with little notice on July 28, 2002. Jennifer LeRoy said the restaurant had failed because "people didn't think of the Russian Tea Room as a place for parties". Other observers said Warner had tried too hard to emulate the operation of Tavern on the Green, which had both more customers and lower operating expenses.

=== Redevelopment attempts and reopening ===
After the restaurant had closed, the Tea Room filed for bankruptcy, and a judge scheduled an auction for the restaurant building. The United States Golf Association (USGA) wished to buy the Tea Room building and convert it into a visitor center and golf museum, which would have replaced the USGA Museum in New Jersey. The USGA acquired the building in November 2002, bidding $16 million; the sale included all of the restaurant's furnishings, artwork, tableware, and decorations. The association planned to add interactive exhibits and golf memorabilia after removing the existing furnishings. A critic for The New York Times wrote: "Nothing could have brought it back to vigorous life, but the idea that the old place could become a golf museum is shocking." The USGA canceled its plan for a golf museum in June 2003, citing the high costs of renovating the Tea Room, and the association continued to operate its museum in New Jersey.

The USGA resold the building in 2004 to Gerald Lieblich's RTR Funding Group for about $19 million. The sale included the air rights above the restaurant building, as well as its name. Lieblich announced in 2006 that he had hired an executive chef and manager and that he planned to reopen the restaurant. The decor remained largely unchanged from LeRoy's renovation, although the Tiffany glass ceiling was removed, and the seats were replaced. Robins changed the restaurant's menu, serving dishes with less butter and fewer calories, and adapting many of the restaurant's dishes. The Russian Tea Room reopened on November 1, 2006. By 2009, the restaurant's vice president had added a children's tea menu, an express menu for business travelers, and a list of half-bottle wines.

After the 2022 Russian invasion of Ukraine, the Tea Room's business declined when many people had boycotted businesses related to Russia, even though restaurant officials had condemned the invasion.

== Design ==
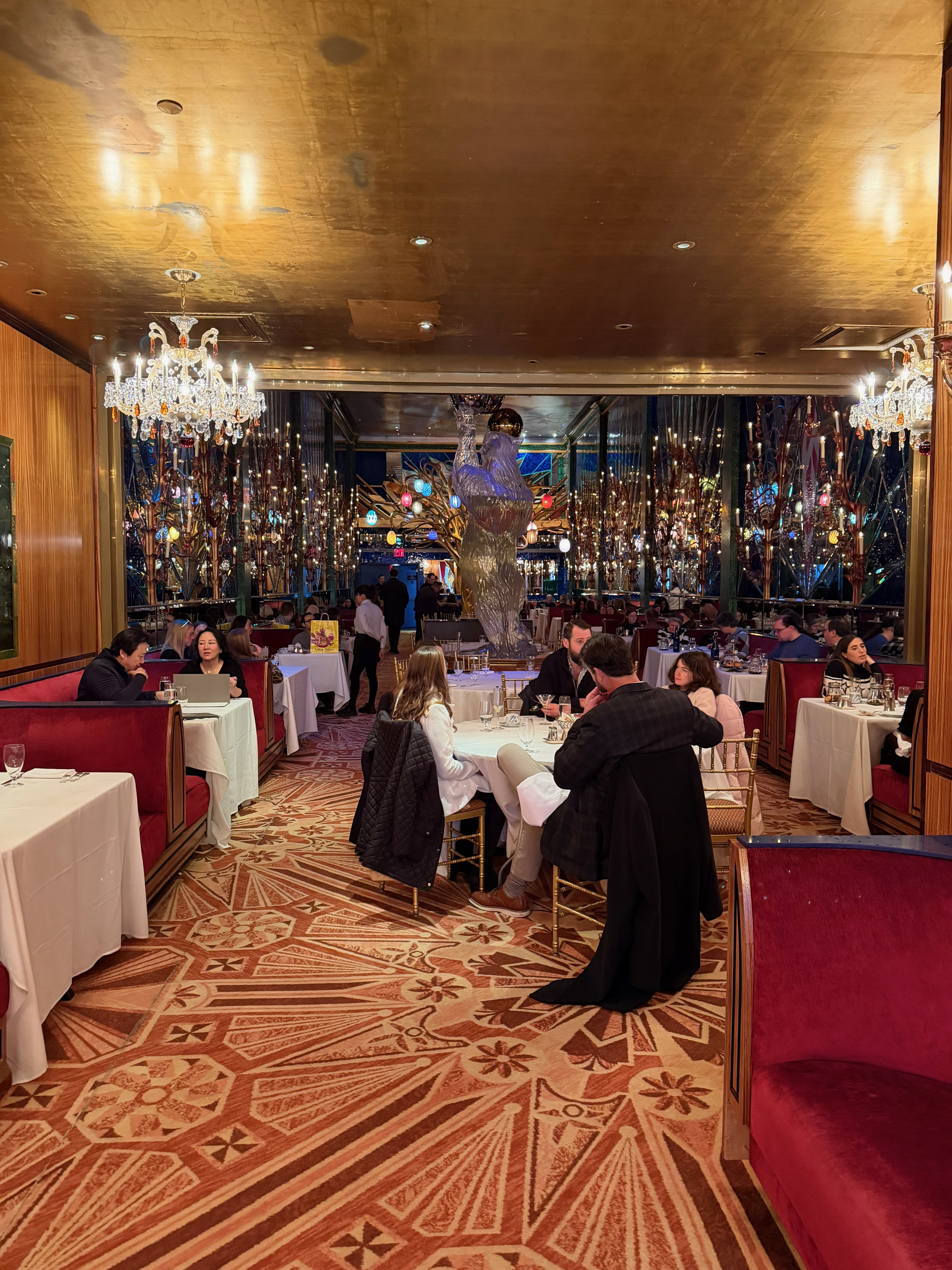
Interior, second floor

The restaurant building was originally four stories high. The structure measures 25 feet (7.6 m) wide and extends the entire length of the block to 56th Street. The floors do not have load-bearing walls, allowing a flexible arrangement of furniture.

During the 1990s renovation, the ground floor remained intact, but the upper stories were modified significantly. After the restaurant reopened in 1999, the first floor was designed in a similar manner to the original, with stag-head and firebird motifs; an ice sculpture was placed in the center. There was a bear-shaped revolving aquarium on the second floor. This story also contained green and red upholstery, a gold-painted tree with 35 glass eggs, and a Tiffany glass ceiling with 250,000 pieces of glass mosaic. The upper stories were decorated with a fireplace, bronze-painted domed ceilings, and blue walls. There was a double-height ballroom on the third floor and three private dining rooms on the fourth floor. The fourth story also contained a 3D model of troops in Moscow's Red Square, Many of these decorations were salvaged from Maxwell's Plum, also operated by LeRoy. After 2006, the top two stories were used for catered private events, while the lowest two stories contained the restaurants.

== Cuisine ==
A 1938 article in Vogue magazine cited the Tea Room as selling "authentic blinis, with caviar, melted butter, and sour cream, but only if you are wise enough to order ahead". When the Russian Tea Room reopened in 1999, it primarily served Russian and Georgian cuisine. Among the dishes served were pelmeni, fish, and hot borscht; the restaurant also sold 250 types of wine. By 2006, the restaurant's menu included borscht, as well as blinchiki with goat cheese, duck confit, and wild mushrooms. One of the most expensive dishes on the menu, Iranian caviar, cost $350/oz ($12/g). Other dishes, such as beef Stroganoff and chicken Kiev, were not listed on the menu but could be cooked on request.

== Notable guests ==
The Los Angeles Times wrote in 1983 that "As a lunch room it services the Manhattan headquarters of the major studios. [...] Those in the know also know the importance—literally the significance within the inner sanctums of show business—of being seen there". When the Tea Room closed in 2002, Nation's Restaurant News wrote: "Over the years the celebrated restaurant was a haunt for the rich and famous". The New York Times wrote that the restaurant had attracted "agents, performers and power brokers in the cluster of entertainment businesses" in the area, but that the restaurant's popularity slowly declined as older patrons died.

- Woody Allen
- Rowan Atkinson
- Lauren Bacall
- Anne Bancroft
- Tallulah Bankhead
- Noel Behn
- Leonard Bernstein
- Victor Borge
- Lucrezia Bori
- Mel Brooks
- Richard Burton
- Nicolas Cage
- Charles III
- Bill Clinton
- Sam Cohn
- Michael Douglas
- Mischa Elman
- Kirsten Flagstad
- Clark Gable
- Ossip Gabrilowitsch
- Jascha Heifetz
- Dustin Hoffman
- Wanda Toscanini Horowitz
- Lou Jacobi
- Jacqueline Kennedy Onassis
- Henry Kissinger
- Fritz Kreisler
- Madonna, worked as a coat-check attendant
- Arthur Miller
- Liza Minnelli
- Mike Nichols
- Sidney Poitier
- Rosa Ponselle
- Anthony Quayle
- William Saroyan
- Arthur Rubinstein
- George Segal
- Alan Schneider
- Ringo Starr
- Leopold Stokowski
- Barbra Streisand
- Richard Suskind
- Elizabeth Taylor
- Peter Ustinov
- Mitchell A. Wilson

British comedian Rowan Atkinson married makeup artist Sunetra Sastry at the Tea Room in February 1990.

== Reception ==
Bryan Miller of The New York Times said in 1992 that "beneath all the hype there is little substance", saying that the restaurant suffered from "inattentive and unprofessional" service despite being highly patronized. After the Tea Room reopened in 1999, it received several negative reviews. William Grimes of the Times wrote that the reopened restaurant was "appalling", saying: "More than ever, the Russian Tea Room is not about the food. [...] The modern touches that [Canelle] has introduced often seem peculiar, and the traditional dishes lack soul." Lenore Skenazy of the New York Daily News wrote: "If you want opulence, it's here. If you want history, hurry over. If you want borscht, run! For your life." Architecturally, it was more positively acclaimed; the Tea Room received the Award for Outstanding Restaurant Design from the James Beard Foundation in 2001.

When the Tea Room reopened in 2006, several reviews noted that waitstaff often took their time delivering food and failed to respond to customers' repeated requests. Times food critic Frank Bruni regarded the restaurant as "good", saying that "in terms of food and all else, the Russian Tea Room doesn't add up neatly or quite make sense", although the high quality of the food was counterbalanced by poor service. A writer for the Columbus Dispatch said, "The lore (think boldfaced names and movie cameos) and decor are the reasons most people will come, but the food can be a draw as well" unless one was a vegetarian or was looking for the Tea Room's staple dishes. A writer for The New Yorker said the food "runs from serviceable [...] to forgettably enjoyable", but the waitstaff were apathetic.

== In popular culture ==
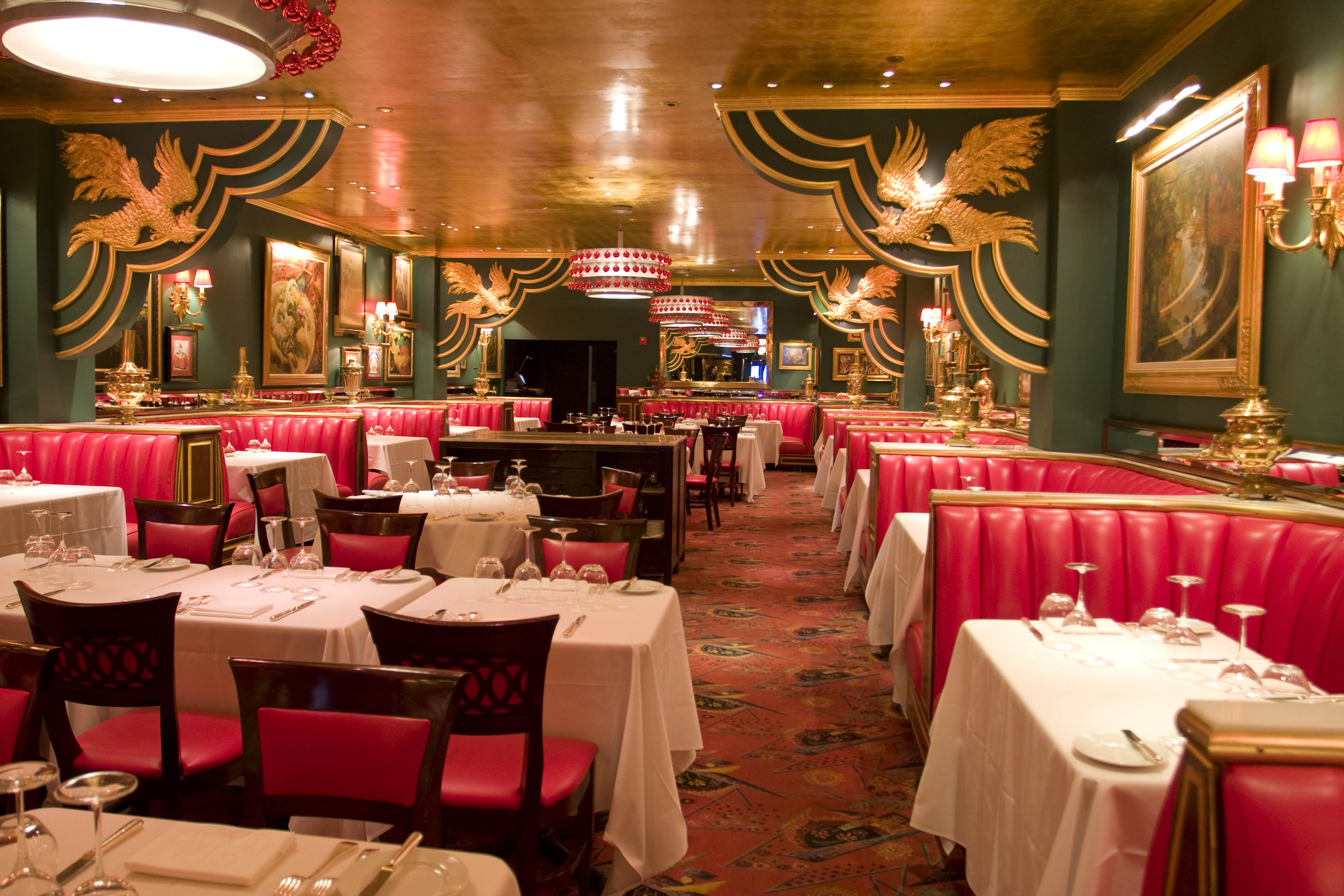
Interior of the Russian Tea Room in November 2009

=== Artworks ===
- It is depicted in a painting by Beryl Cook.

=== Films ===
- Scenes from The Turning Point, Manhattan, Tootsie, When Harry Met Sally..., Big, The Smurfs, Sweet Smell of Success, New York Stories, Unfaithfully Yours, and The Extra Man were filmed at the restaurant.

=== Literature ===
- It is featured in Eve Babitz's Sex and Rage as a place where literary agents take authors out to lunch.
- It is mentioned in Jay McInerney's novel Bright Lights, Big City.

=== Television ===
- "The One Where the Monkey Gets Away" and "The One With the Evil Orthodontist" episodes of Friends mentions it numerous times.
- "The Wrath of Con" episode of Gossip Girl was filmed there.
- The "Dad" episode of Louie was filmed there, and in season 3 Louie meets his Uncle Excelsior there for lunch
- In 1995, it was shown in The Nanny season 3 episode "Pen Pal".
- It is used as a setting in the 2016-2017 season of Saturday Night Live's intro, introducing Aidy Bryant in the scene.
- In 2002, it was shown in the background of a scene in the season 1 episode "Tuxedo Hill" of Law & Order: Criminal Intent.
- It is the setting of a meeting in season 3 episode "Icebreaker" of the show Billions.

== See also ==
- List of restaurants in New York City
- List of Russian restaurants
- Russian tea culture
- Russian Tea Time
