= Moscow Restaurant =

Russian restaurant in Beijing

Moscow Restaurant 莫斯科餐厅 Ресторан Москва
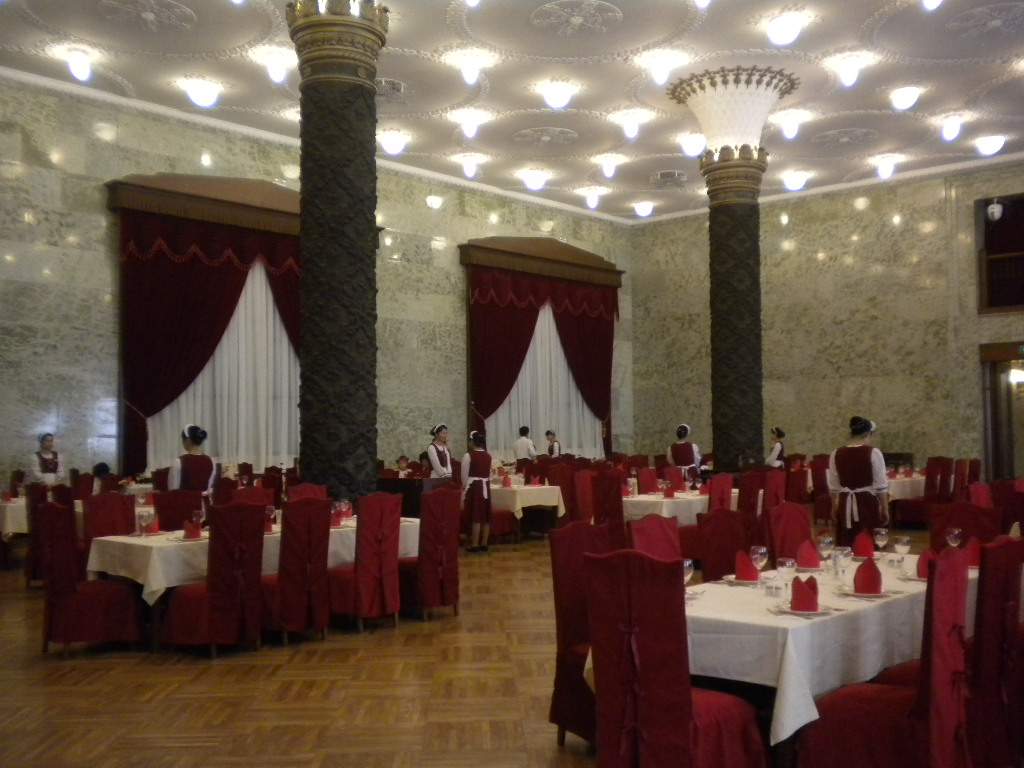
- Interior of Moscow Restaurant (2010)
- Interactive map of Moscow Restaurant 莫斯科餐厅; Ресторан Москва

Restaurant information
- Established: October 2, 1954
- Owner: Beijing Exhibition Center
- Food type: Russian cuisine
- Location: Beijing, China
- Coordinates: 39°56′25.7″N 116°20′34.7″E
- Seating capacity: 600

Moscow Restaurant (Chinese: 莫斯科餐厅; pinyin: Mòsīkē Cāntīng) is a Russian restaurant located in Xicheng District, Beijing. Founded in 1954 as part of the former Soviet Exhibition Center, the restaurant was intended to foster friendship and cultural understanding between the People's Republic of China and the former Soviet Union. As one of the first Western restaurants in the nation's capital, Moscow Restaurant holds a nostalgic position in Beijing. Still operating to this day, the restaurant is affectionately nicknamed "Old Moscow" (Chinese: 老莫, Pinyin: lǎo mò).

== History ==
Having lasted through the "honeymoon" period of Sino-Soviet relations, the Sino-Soviet split, and the eventual fall of the Soviet Union, the Moscow Restaurant is a historical testament to the changes in China–Soviet Union relations.

=== Founding and popularity ===
Like the rest of the Beijing Exhibition Center complex, the Moscow Restaurant was designed by Soviet architects. Originally named the Soviet Exhibition Center, the project was intended to showcase the modernity of Stalinist architecture and let Chinese citizens learn more about life and culture in the Soviet Union. As one of the "Sino-Soviet friendship buildings", it was part of an attempt to modernize China by modelling the nation after the Soviet Union.

In the 1950s, the restaurant first served Soviet visitors such as ambassadors, advisors, and scientists, as well as Chinese students that had returned from studying in the Soviet Union. During the Moscow Restaurant's grand opening, then-Premiere Zhou Enlai invited Khrushchev's delegation to dine there at a state banquet. Beyond serving the USSR embassy and other Soviet expats, for the Chinese, only politicians and celebrities had access to the meal tickets required to get in.

After the restaurant opened to the general public and started accepting cash, the high prices made the opportunity to dine at the Moscow Restaurant a rare and prized event. With the Chinese government portraying the Soviet Union as a prosperous utopia that China would soon achieve as well, the Moscow Restaurant became a status symbol of modernity. Despite many being unaccustomed to Russian cuisine, young people saved up so that they could go to the restaurant. Representative of the admiration held for the Soviet Union at the time, one man saved his money for three months in order to take his girlfriend to the Moscow Restaurant, where he proposed to her while singing Moscow Nights.

=== Sino-Soviet split and Cultural Revolution ===
The Moscow Restaurant remained popular until the Sino-Soviet split in the 1960s, and the restaurant was denounced as counter-revolutionary. Soviet cultural import began to be prohibited, and the Chinese government renamed the Soviet Exhibition Center to the Beijing Exhibition Center. The restaurant changed its name to the Beijing Exhibition Restaurant.

During the start of the Cultural Revolution, the Red Guards stormed into the restaurant, accusing the kitchen staff of cooking "revisionist food" while using the dining hall as a place to sleep. The Soviet-trained cooks were told to make only Chinese food, and after shutting down for a year, the restaurant reopened as a cafeteria that only served simple Chinese dishes such as fried rice. Its Western food service was only restored in 1969 at the end of Cultural Revolution, becoming once again the only publicly-open Western restaurant in all of Beijing.

=== Revitalization ===
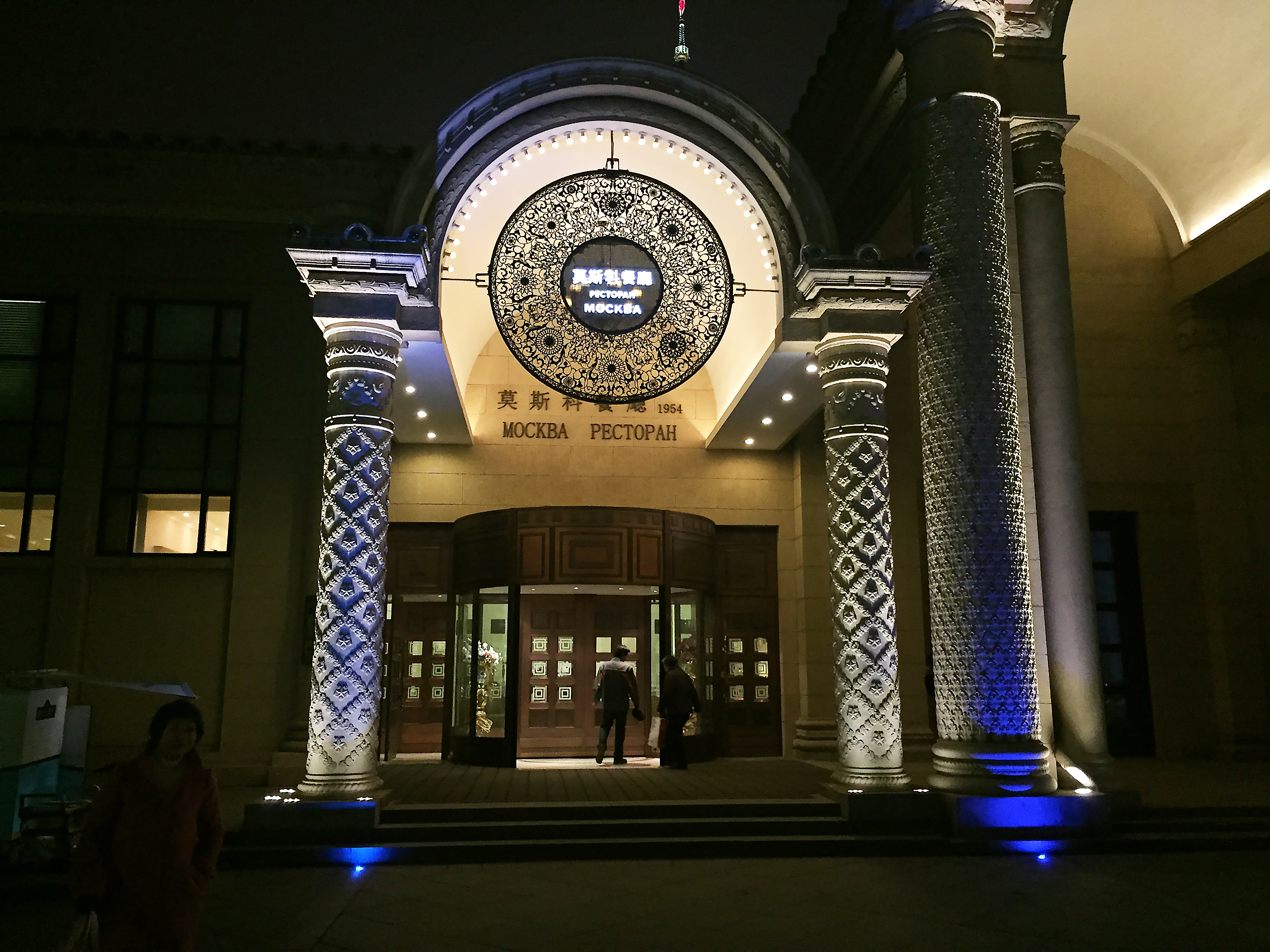
Front entrance of the restaurant (2015)

After the reform and opening up and facing new challenges from the market, the restaurant slowly changed its operational mode, and on November 7, 1984, the restaurant reverted to its original name. No longer limited to the politically and economically privileged, the Moscow Restaurant became well known across the city. Despite its appearance as a Western fine dining establishment, the dishes were quite affordable, and in the 1980s, the restaurant became a popular place for weddings. Its history as formerly the only foreign restaurant in Beijing has made it a site of nostalgia for older residents; despite the government's best efforts to remove all Soviet influence in the 1960s, the admiration for Soviet culture lived on.

With ballroom chandeliers and towering pillars, the restaurant covers 1,300 square metres (14,000 sq ft) and has a current capacity of 600 people. The restaurant underwent renovations in 2000, with its style differing from how it looked in 1954. After complaints from patrons who preferred the older look, the restaurant was renovated again in 2009 to restore the Moscow Restaurant to its original style. Rarely changing its menu, the Moscow Restaurant still serves typical Russian fare as well as dishes common in Western fine dining, such as borscht, beef solyanka, cream of mushroom soup, chicken Kiev, and kvass.

== Cultural legacy ==
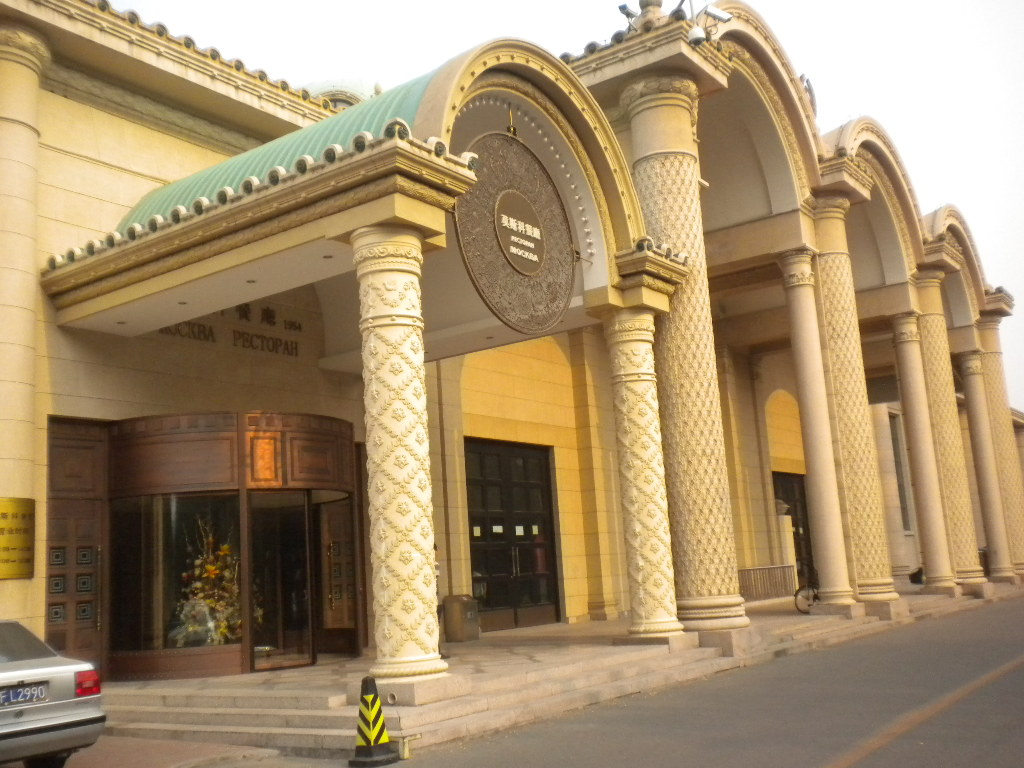
Front entrance to restaurant during the day (2010)

The Moscow Restaurant was not only host to many prominent figures such as Mao Zedong and Zhu De, but has also figured in many Chinese literary works. Depictions and memories of the Moscow Restaurant are typically split between those who associate it with the revolutionary spirit of the 1950s versus those who more remember it as a nostalgic enjoyment. Notable media which references the Moscow Restaurant include:

- In the Heat of the Sun, 1994 film directed by Jiang Wen
- The Place Where Dreams Start, 1999 TV series directed by Ye Jing
- Playing for Thrills, 1989 novel by author Wang Shuo
- The Singing was like Radiant Spring, 2000 memoir by former Minister of Culture Wang Meng
- Romantic Life, 2004 novel by author Du Liang

== See also ==
- Pekin (hotel) - Soviet-era hotel and Chinese restaurant built in Moscow as the Moscow Restaurant's counterpart
- Shanghai Exhibition Centre - Soviet exhibition center built in Shanghai at the same time
- Ten Great Buildings - Beijing buildings representative of post-split Sino-Soviet architecture
- KFC in China - History of the first Western fast food restaurant in China after liberalization
