= Warner LeRoy =

American businessman

Warner Lewis LeRoy (March 5, 1935 – February 22, 2001), was a New York City businessman. LeRoy was the son of film producer-director Mervyn LeRoy and Mervyn's second wife, Doris Warner, the grandson of Harry Warner, one of the founders of Warner Bros., first cousin once removed of pioneer film producer Jesse L. Lasky, and a major contributor to the development of the film industry.

== Career ==
Warner founded LeRoy Adventures, which owned and operated the York Cinema, Maxwell's Plum, Potomac in Washington, D.C., Great Adventure, Tavern on the Green and the Russian Tea Room.

Tavern on the Green, located in Central Park, was one of the most popular restaurants in New York City. In 1974, LeRoy took over the restaurant's lease and reopened in 1976 after $10 million in renovations. During a labor dispute in 1989, Warner was quoted as asking, "What do waiters need a pension for?" Warner was known to pay for his employees' children's education. Tavern routinely produced the highest gross revenue of all U.S. restaurants during the years from the 1980s until the early 2000s.

In 1995, LeRoy purchased The Russian Tea Room, and he spent $32 million on renovations. It closed in 2002, one year after LeRoy's death. It later reopened under different ownership.

== Personal life ==
As a child, LeRoy made "a tour of prep schools including Hotchkiss in Connecticut and Le Rosey in Switzerland" before graduating from Stanford University with a bachelor's degree in English. After graduating, he went to New York to work as an assistant to writer-director Garson Kanin.

He had one child, Bridget, with his first wife, Gen LeRoy (later the second wife of Tony Walton), and three children with his second wife Kay O'Reilly: Carolyn, Max, and Jennifer. Jennifer became the CEO of LeRoy Adventures at age 22 upon LeRoy's death of complications from lymphoma in 2001 at age 65. He is buried at the Shaarey Pardes Accabonac Grove Cemetery in the Hamptons, New York.
