= Beijing Exhibition Center =

Soviet-built exhibition venue in Beijing

Coordinates: 39.9394°N 116.3379°E

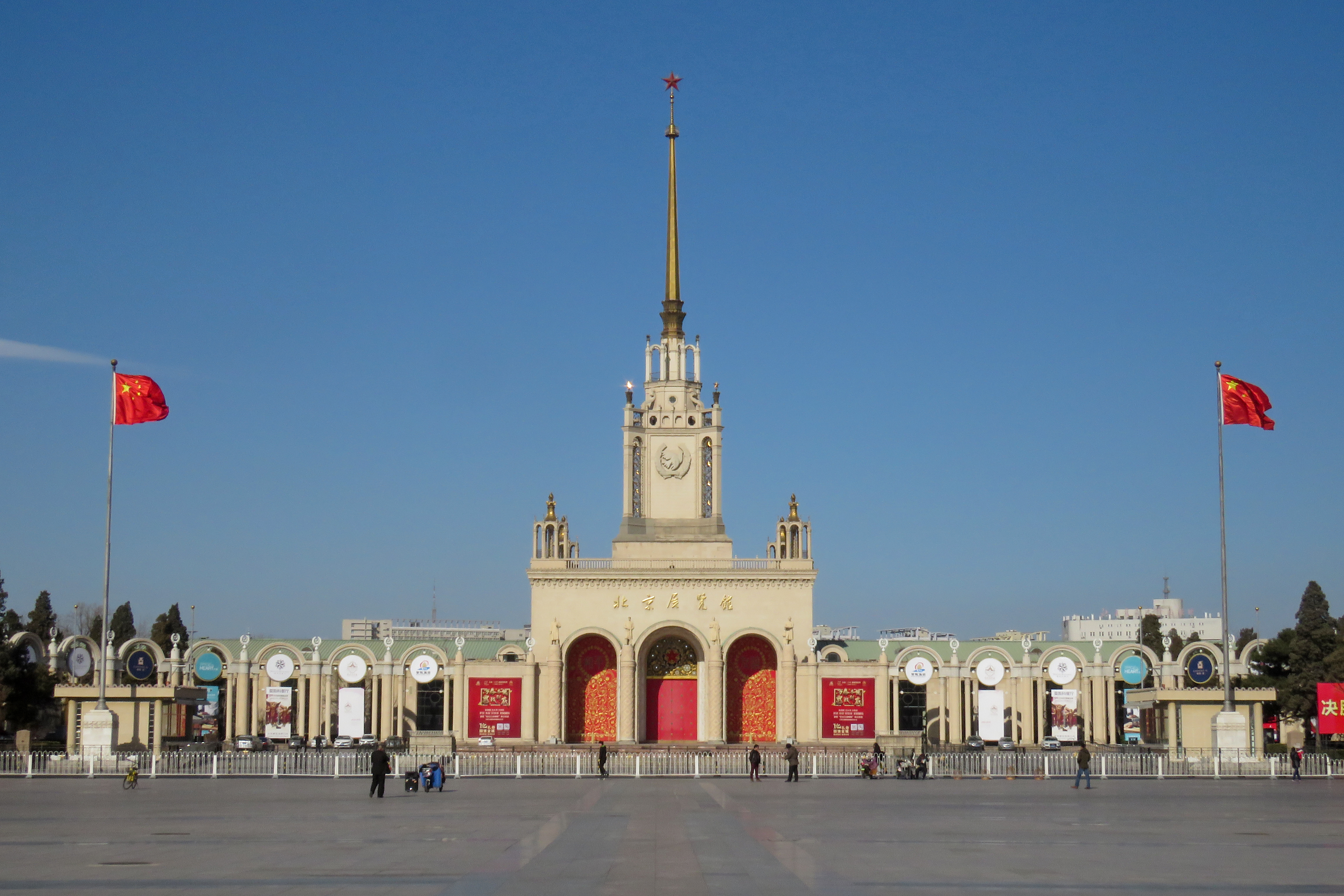
The Beijing Exhibition Center

The Beijing Exhibition Center (simplified Chinese: 北京展览馆; traditional Chinese: 北京展覽館; pinyin: Běijīng Zhǎnlǎnguǎn) was established in 1954 as a comprehensive exhibition venue in Beijing, China. Built in the Sino-Soviet architectural style that was popular in the 1950s, the Beijing Exhibition Center contains three large exhibition halls as well as museums.

It has a theater hall (北京展览馆剧场) with 2,700 seats, playing a wide range of shows including Chinese plays, Western and Chinese operas and ballets, musicals and rock concerts. It also hosts the Moscow Restaurant, one of the first Western restaurants in China.

== History ==
=== Sino-Soviet Friendship ===
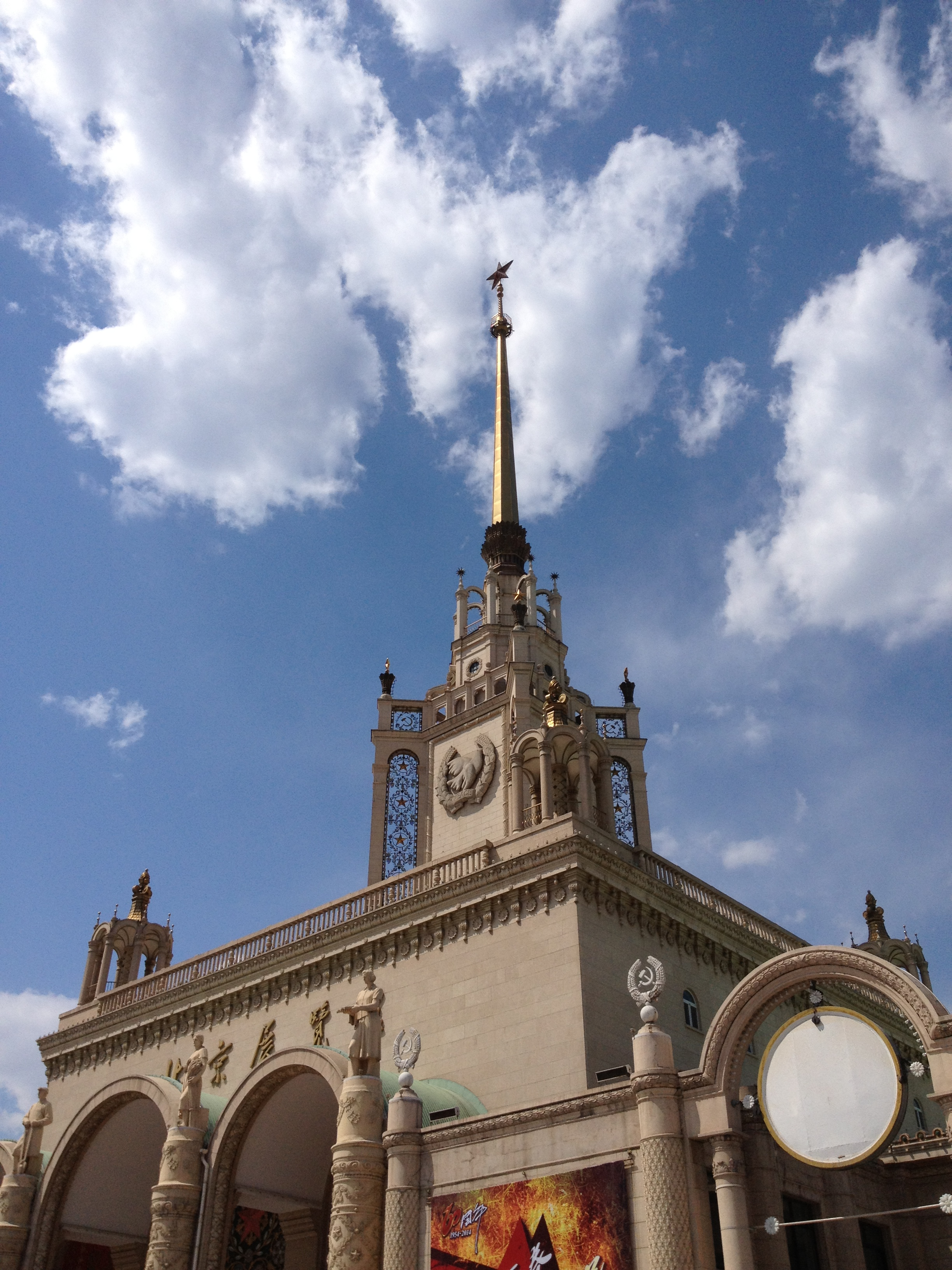
Close-up of the 87-meter tall main building with red star on top (2014)

Formerly known as the Soviet Exhibition Center, the venue was built by Soviet architects to promote Sino-Soviet friendship. The idea was first proposed by Chinese politician Li Fuchun as part of an effort to showcase the modernity of the USSR. Three other exhibition centers were built in Shanghai, Guangzhou, and Wuhan. Along with galleries of Soviet industrial technology, the venues exhibited Soviet paintings, ballet, and cuisine. Chinese politicians such as Mao Zedong and Liu Shaoqi were delighted at the exhibition, seeing it as a promise that the still rural China would be industrialized to the same extent as the USSR.

For many Chinese people, the exhibition centers were the first time that they had seen modern technology and Western culture outside of media, and in total, the first year of exhibitions drew more than 11 million visitors at the four different venues. In the 1950s, people would gather at the exhibition center to celebrate important events such as college graduations or weddings. At a time when many students wished to pursue an education in the Soviet Union, those selected to study abroad would make a pilgrimage to the exhibition center to commemorate the beginning of their journey. At the center of the exhibition center was an open-air theater where Soviet troupes would perform Swan Lake, the first ballet performance for many Chinese people, and the style of Soviet ballet would heavily impact Chinese ballet. At the height of Sino-Soviet friendship in the 1950s, it was fashionable to sing Russian songs such as Moscow Nights and Katyusha, learn the Russian accordion, go ice skating at the Shichahai skating rink, and play chess. People saw this as a way to foster friendship and understanding with the Soviet Union, with the dream of achieving international communist solidarity.

As part of its mission to introduce Chinese people to Soviet culture, the center's Moscow Restaurant served common Russian fare such as borscht and solyanka. With its high prices and exotic cuisine, dining at the restaurant became a status symbol for many young people, who would save up for months to take their partners on dates there. The restaurant was also the host for many state banquets and catered most of the Soviet embassy's events as well.

=== Sino-Soviet Split and Cultural Revolution ===
With the Sino-Soviet split and the Cultural Revolution, the Soviet Exhibition Center was renamed the Beijing Exhibition Center. The Moscow Restaurant was renamed the Beijing Exhibition Restaurant and was repurposed as a cafeteria that only served Chinese food. The import of Russian culture was forbidden. National architectural efforts such as the Ten Great Buildings develop a modernized style with traditional Chinese characteristics instead, and many Soviet-built buildings were demolished as part of this process. However, the Beijing Exhibition Center escaped this fate of demolition.

=== Today ===
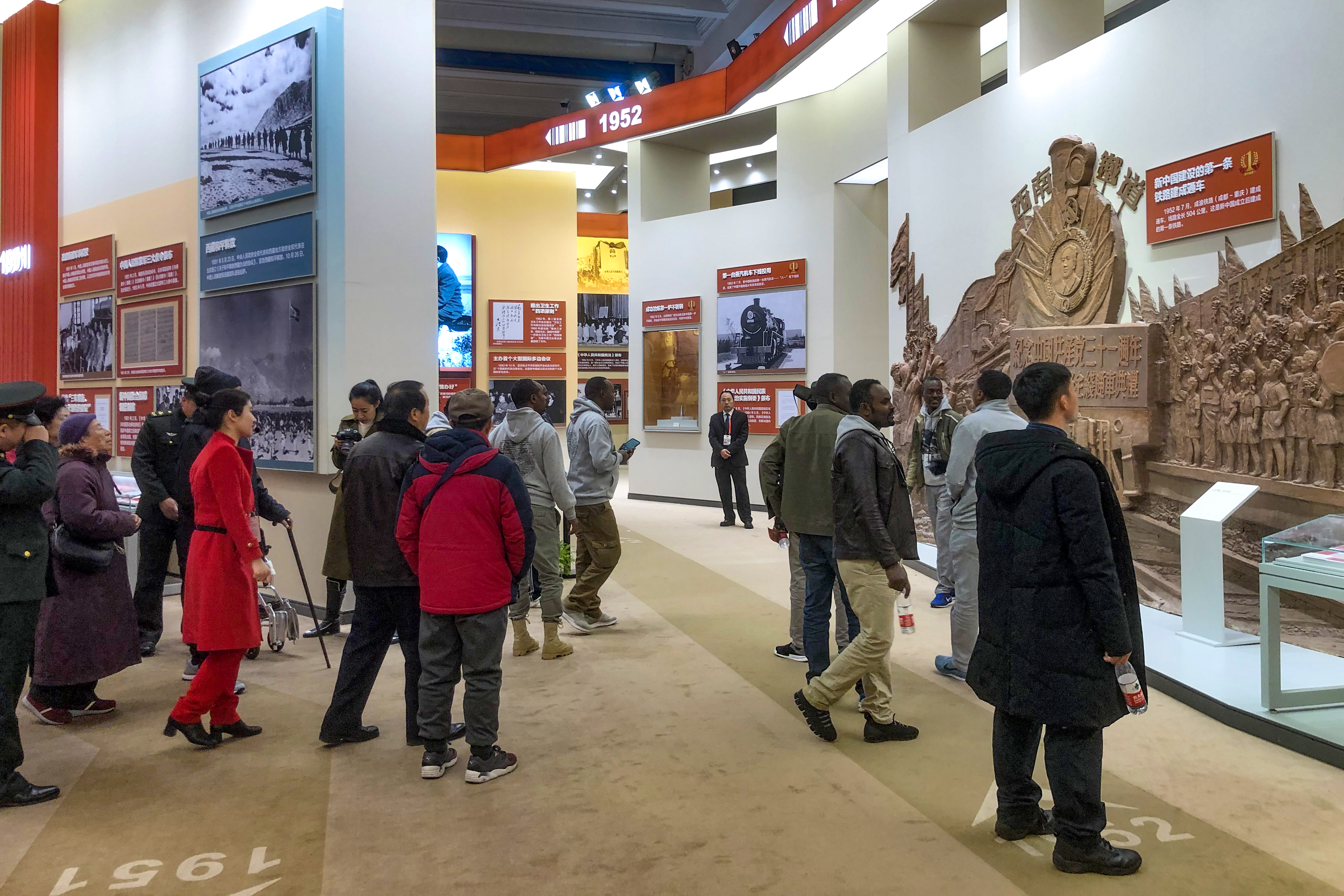
A modern exhibition celebrating the 70 year anniversary of the PRC (2019)

After the reform and opening up, the venue was reopened. The Moscow Restaurant restored its original name and operation, although the Beijing Exhibition Center retained its new name. While the exhibition center is still known for its nostalgic and political history, the exhibitions halls now host a variety of events by private organizations such as art galleries.

== See also ==
- Shanghai Exhibition Centre
