= Dacha Diner =

Defunct restaurant in Seattle, Washington, U.S.

- Interactive map of Dacha Diner

Restaurant information
- Established: December 2018
- Closed: March 2022
- Food type: Eastern European; Jewish; Russian
- Location: 1416 E Olive Way, Seattle, Washington, 98122, United States
- Coordinates: 47.6176°N 122.3266°W

Dacha Diner was an Eastern European, Jewish, and Russian restaurant in Seattle's Capitol Hill neighborhood, in the U.S. state of Washington.

== Description ==
The menu included khachapuri, latkes (potato pancakes), brisket, pelmeni, borscht, matzo ball soup, sandwiches, cider, and wine.

== History ==
Following a soft opening in late December 2018, the restaurant opened in 2019. It closed in March 2022.

== Reception ==
Dacha Diner was included in Bon Appetit’s list of 50 Best New Restaurants. In 2019, the business was a finalist in the Restaurant of the Year category in Eater Seattle's annual Eater Awards. The website's Gabe Guarente wrote, "The signature khachapuri — a decadent Georgian bread and cheese dish that’s rare in Seattle — is not to be missed." Guarente also included the restaurant's khachapuri in "10 Seattle Dishes That Became Stars in 2019". Allecia Vermillion included the restaurant in Seattle Metropolitan's 2021 list of "The Best Restaurants on Capitol Hill". Jessica Voelker of Condé Nast Traveler wrote, "Doughy, rich, and achingly delicious, the food at Dacha Diner will warm you from the inside out."

== See also ==
- List of defunct restaurants of the United States
- List of Russian restaurants
