= Kachka (restaurant) =

Russian restaurant in Portland, Oregon, U.S.

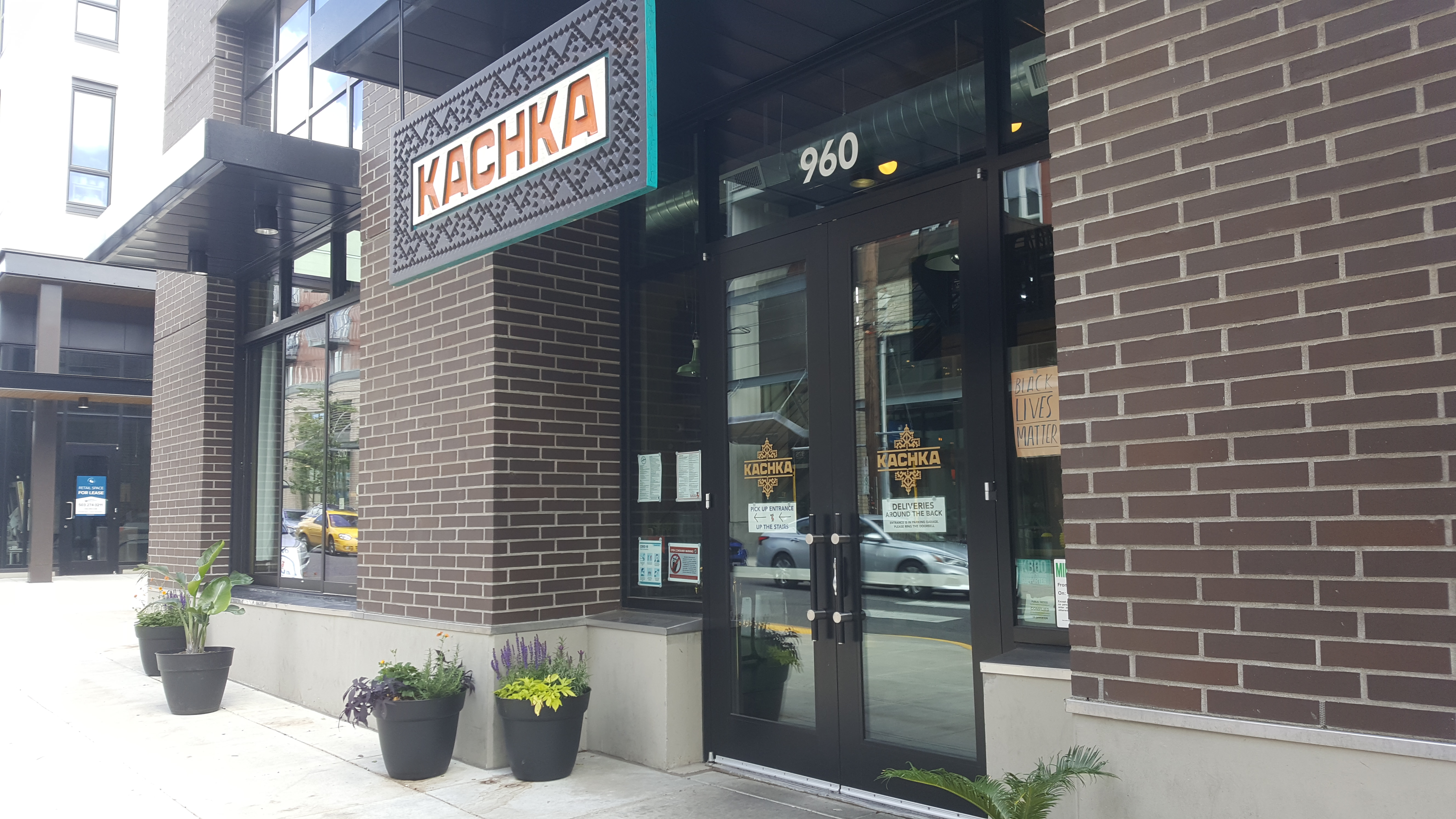
- The restaurant's exterior in 2021
- Interactive map of Kachka

Restaurant information
- Established: 2014
- Owners: Israel Morales; Bonnie Morales
- Head chef: Bonnie Morales
- Food type: Russian
- Location: 960 Southeast 11th Avenue, Portland, Oregon, United States
- Coordinates: 45°30′57.0″N 122°39′16.2″W
- Website: kachkapdx.com

Kachka is a restaurant serving Russian cuisine in Portland, Oregon's Buckman neighborhood, in the United States.

== History ==
Kachka was founded in 2014 and is owned by Israel and Bonnie Morales (née Frumkin). Bonnie, who serves as the head chef, was born in Chicago where her Belarusian parents ran a restaurant near Wrigley Field in the 1990s.

In late 2019, they opened Kachka Lavka, a grocery and deli, in the mezzanine of the restaurant.

In 2020, Kachka opened a summer pop-up, Kachka Alfresca, which served 1990s-inspired comfort food. Kachka Alfresca closed in October 2020.

The restaurant implemented service fees, replacing optional tipping.

Bobby Flay visited the restaurant for a 2023 episode of The Whole Story With Anderson Cooper, called "Restaurant Nation: What's Changed?"

The restaurant participated in Portland's Dumpling Week and Portland Dining Month in 2026. Kachka also participated in Strawberry Shortcake Week, which was presented by and in support of the James Beard Public Market. In 2026, Kachka was among local restaurants, community organizations, and other businesses that joined the "We Are Rip City" campaign in support of the Moda Center renovation project.

== Reception ==
Brooke Jackson-Glidden included the Herring Under a Fur Coat in Eater Portland's 2024 overview of "iconic" Portland dishes. Katrina Yentch included Kachka in Eater Portland's 2025 overview of the best restaurants in Buckman. Rebecca Roland included the sour cherry vareniki in Eater Portland's 2025 overview of the city's eleven best restaurants for desserts.

Kachka was also included in The Infatuation's 2024 list of Portland's best restaurants. Michael Russell included Kann in The Oregonian's 2025 list of the 21 best restaurants in southeast Portland. He also ranked Kachka number 5 in the newspaper's 2025 list of Portland's 40 best restaurants. Hannah Wallace included the business in Condé Nast Traveler's 2025 list of Portland's 23 best restaurants. The business was included in Portland Monthly's 2025 list of 25 restaurants "that made Portland". Writers for Portland Monthly included the pelmini in a 2025 list of the city's "most iconic" dishes.

== See also ==
- List of Russian restaurants
