= Peking Hotel =

Hotel in Moscow, Russia

Coordinates: 55.7687°N 37.5940°E

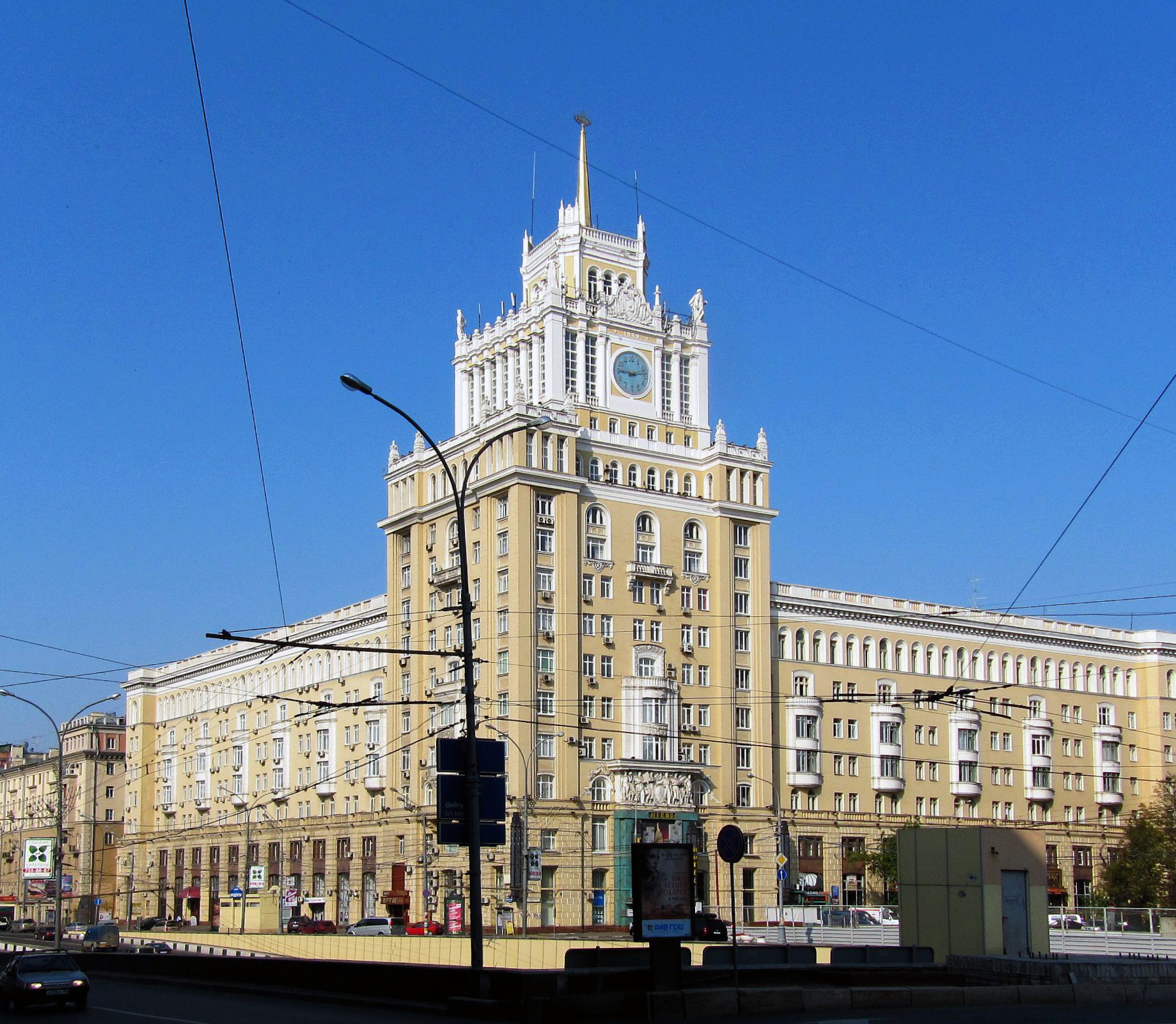
The Peking Hotel in 2011

The Peking Hotel (Russian: гостиница Пекин) is a building in Moscow, Russia, which houses a four-star hotel and an office complex.

== History ==
The building, which was designed in the Stalinist classicism style, was constructed between 1939 and 1955. It is located in the city center at the intersection of the Garden Ring and Tverskaya Street. Designed by Soviet architect Dmitry Chechulin, the hotel was originally intended to commemorate Sino-Soviet friendship, but by the time it was completed, the relationship between two nations had gone cold.

Peking Hotel, which is owned by Sistema, is located at Bol'shaya Sadovaya Ulitsa, 5 in Moscow. Oleg Kuznetsov (Олег Кузнецов) was the hotel administrator from 2002 to 2016.

In 2011, it was announced that the hotel would be renovated as a luxury hotel and would reopen in 2017, managed by Fairmont Hotels as the Fairmont Pekin Moscow. The renovation and rebranding never happened, however.

In 2020, reconstruction took place: the sculptures decorating the facade of the building, the panels, and the spire were restored.

== See also ==
- Moscow Restaurant – Soviet restaurant built in Beijing as part of the same project
