= Shanghai Exhibition Centre =

Exhibition centre in Shanghai, China

Coordinates: 31°13′36″N 121°26′53″E

- 上海展览中心 (in Chinese)
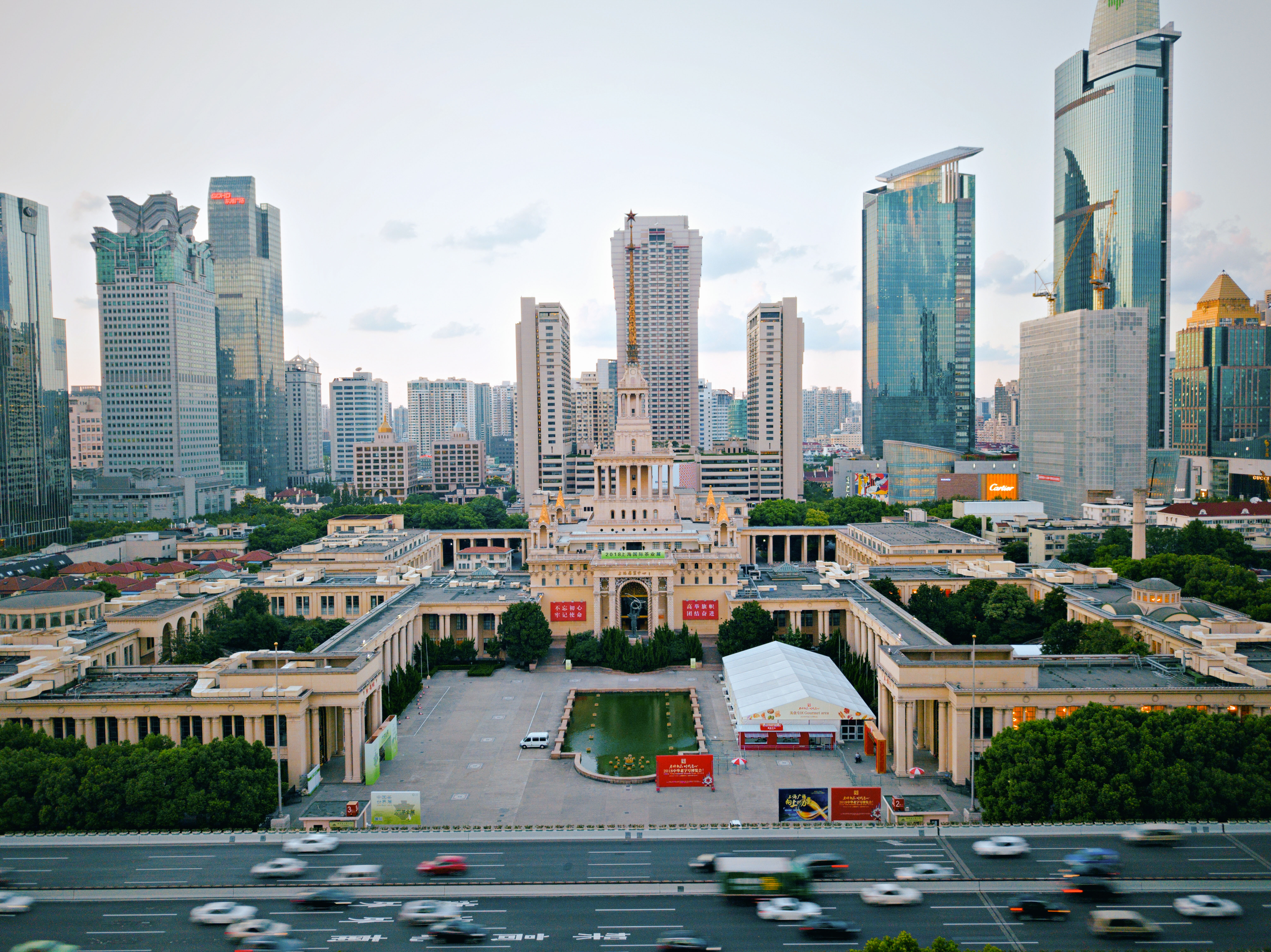
- Shanghai Exhibition Centre
- Former names: Sino-Soviet Friendship Building
- Alternative names: Shanghai Exhibition Hall

General information
- Architectural style: Stalinist
- Location: Shanghai
- Current tenants: Shanghai Exhibition Centre
- Construction started: May 4, 1954
- Completed: March 5, 1955
- Client: Municipality of Shanghai

Height
- Height: 110.4 metres

Website
- www.shzlzx.com.cn

The Shanghai Exhibition Centre (Chinese: 上海展览中心; pinyin: Shànghǎi Zhǎnlǎn Zhōngxīn) or the Shanghai Exhibition Hall (Chinese: 上海展览馆; pinyin: Shànghǎi Zhǎnlǎn Guǎn; Shanghainese: Zaonhe Tsoelekuoe) is an exhibition and convention centre in central Shanghai. The building was built in 1955 as the Sino-Soviet Friendship Building (Chinese: 中苏友好大厦) to commemorate the alliance between China and the Soviet Union, a name by which many locals still refer to the building. Reflecting its original name, the design draws heavily on Russian and Empire style neoclassical architecture with Stalinist neoclassical innovations.

The building is a major landmark in Shanghai. At 93,000 square metres, it is one of the largest integrated building complexes in central Shanghai by footprint. At 110.4 metres (to the top of spire), it was for decades (1955–1988) the tallest building in Shanghai. Its main frontage, an open quadrangle with an elaborate central tower, faces Yan'an Road, today the main east–west artery across central Shanghai, while its secondary façade, a colonnade, faces West Nanjing Road, one of the premier retail and commercial streets of Shanghai.

== History ==
The Shanghai Exhibition Centre stands on the site of the home of early 20th century magnate of Jewish descent, Silas Aaron Hardoon, Aili Garden, but more commonly known as "Hardoon Garden". Hardoon used his influences and positions in both the Shanghai International Settlement and Shanghai French Concession to buy up this large lot in what was even then becoming prime real estate in the city, and began building his residence in 1904. Completed in 1910 and expanded in 1919, Hardoon Garden was for a long time Shanghai's largest and most elaborate private garden. By the time of Hardoon's death in 1931, the garden included within its grounds a theatre, a pagoda, a stone boat, a school, a university and an academy of classical Chinese language and culture. Hardoon's wife Liza went into seclusion after Hardoon's death, and the garden became neglected. Liza died in 1941 and was buried in the garden. Later that year, with the outbreak of the Pacific War, Hardoon Garden was occupied by the Japanese army until the end of the war.

Neglect, and looting by the Japanese military during the war and locals after the war, reduced the Hardoon Garden to a desolate state by the time the Chinese Communist Party (CCP) took over Shanghai in 1949. When Hardoon's heirs fled Shanghai, the new government confiscated the garden.

To pay homage to the Soviet Union, the CCP leadership decided in the early 1950s to hold an exhibition in Shanghai in 1955 on the Soviet Union's economic and cultural achievements in the 37 years since the October Revolution. In 1953, the Hardoon Garden site was chosen for the construction of a new building to house this exhibition.

The building was designed by Sergey Andreyev, Chen Zhi, Wang Dingzheng and Cai Xianyu. It resembles the main building of the All-Union Agricultural Exhibition (VDNKh) in Moscow and the Admiralty in Leningrad.

On 4 May 1954 construction on the Sino-Soviet Friendship Building began. The building was completed on 5 March 1955. The Soviet exhibition was held from 15 March 1955 to 15 May 1955.

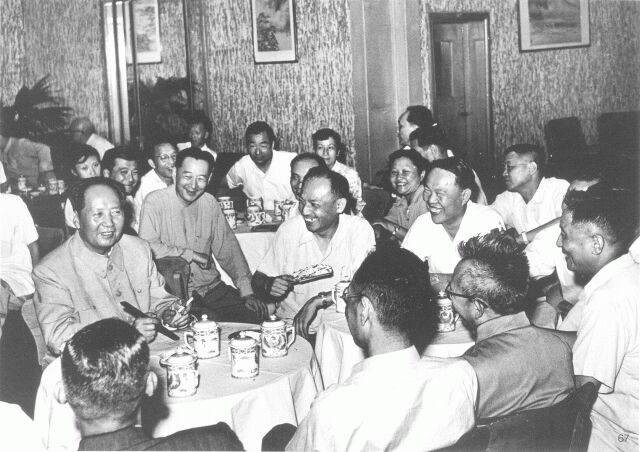
Mao Zedong holds a discussion with celebrities from all walks of life in Shanghai in the Sino-Soviet Friendship Building, 1957

In 1956, the building hosted its first political meeting – the first conference of the Shanghai Municipal Committee of the Chinese Communist Party. Until 2011, when the meetings moved to the new Expo Centre, the building also hosted the annual plenary meetings of Shanghai Municipality's People's Congress (parliament), and People's Political Consultative Conference, making the building Shanghai's de facto municipal parliament building. From 1959, the Sino-Soviet Friendship Building also housed a permanent industrial exhibition, the Shanghai Industrial Exhibition. In the 1950s and 60s, it was an unwritten rule of urban planning followed by the Shanghai government that no new building could exceed in height the red star at the top of the building's central tower.

On 11 May 1968, as a result of the Sino-Soviet split, the building's name was changed to the Shanghai Exhibition Hall. In 1978, the Shanghai Industrial Exhibition became the Shanghai Industrial Exhibition Hall, resulting in the two different names both being applied to the building. On 9 June 1984, the bodies managing the building were amalgamated into the Shanghai Exhibition Centre, by which name the building subsequently became known. The Shanghai Exhibition Centre remains the name of the state-owned enterprise which manages the building and its exhibition and convention business. A major renovation and realignment was completed in 2011 to upgrade facilities and to reorganize the complex with a scheme concentrating exhibition space in the southern part of the complex and conference space in the northern part.

== Layout ==
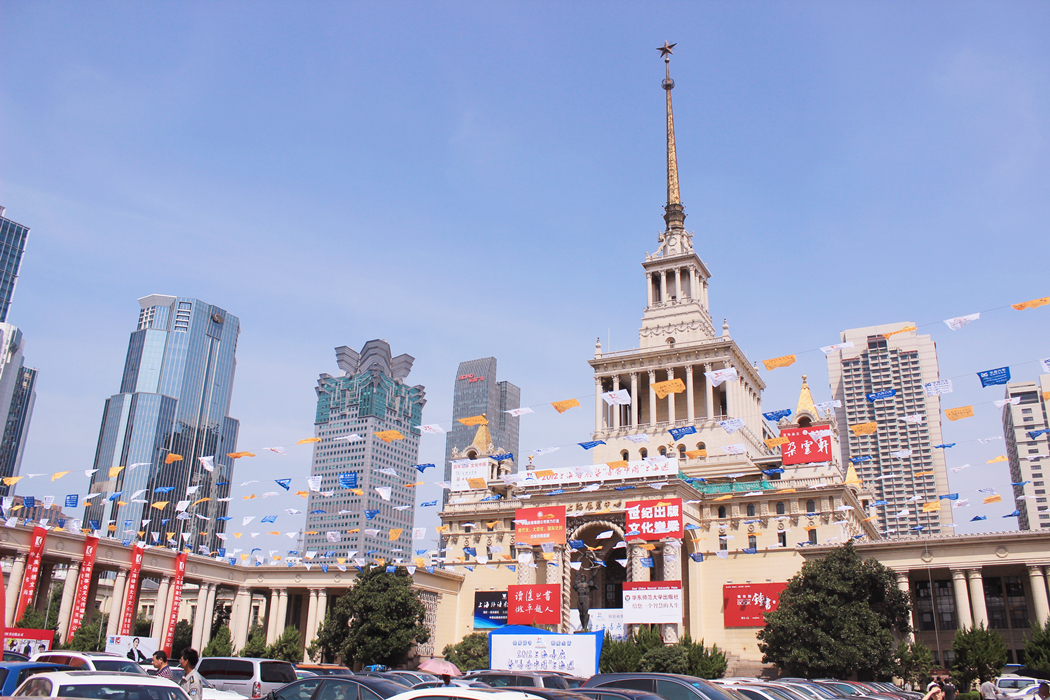
The centre in 2012

The focus of the Sino-Soviet Friendship Building's design is the central tower, modeled on Saint Petersburg's Admiralty Building. It forms the centrepiece of the main, southern façade of the complex, and is set back from the street with an expansive square. Under the central tower is a domed central foyer called the "Central Hall" (now called the "front hall"), which connects the three main wings of the building. Corridors to the east and west of the central foyer lead to two wings which sweep around to form two sides of the open square at the centre of the main frontage. These two wings were built as the "Agriculture Hall" and the "Culture Hall", and today house exhibition space. The Agriculture and Culture wings feature grand sweeping staircases leading visitors between floors. The open square between the Agriculture and Culture wings features a rectangular pool and musical fountains.

North of the central foyer is the largest section of the complex, centred on a 46 metre by 84 metre rectangular hall, topped by a thin-shell vaulted roof with a span of 30 metres. This was originally the main exhibit space of the "Industry Hall", now called the "central hall". Two quadrangles lie on either side of the main hall, surrounded by further exhibition and conference space that were formerly also part of the Industry wing.

The final section of the complex lies to the north of the Industry wing. Originally the "Cinema" wing and now called the "Friendship Hall", this is now the conference wing of the complex and makes up the northern end of the complex, and is fronted by the secondary, northern façade with a colonnade. This section houses the theatre or cinema and, underneath, a dining hall which was originally designed to be a café.

== Artwork ==
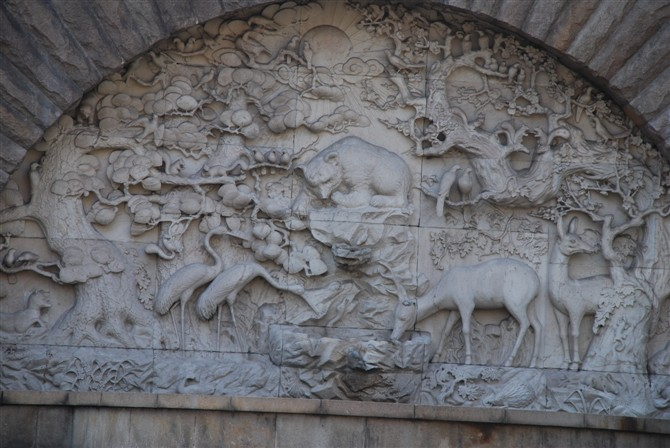
Exterior detail

An art program, completed by local artists under the direction of the Shanghai Art Association, was commissioned for the building. While interior decorations have been overhauled over the years, much of the original relief sculpture work is still visible in various parts of the complex. The central spire is topped by a prominent red star modeled on the Kremlin stars. Originally, a monumental sculpture stood at the base of the central tower, showing a Chinese worker and a Russian worker standing together, each holding up a hammer. This was removed following the Sino-Soviet split, the space now taken up by a bronze statue of a worker holding up a tangle of flowing ribbons.

Other artwork have also been added to the complex over the years. Arman's sculpture Cavalleria Eroica is located in front of the Nanjing Road façade of the building.

== See also ==
Other buildings of similar age and style in China:

- Beijing Exhibition Center (1954)
- Military Museum of the Chinese People's Revolution (1960)
