= Maxwell's Plum =

Bar and restaurant in New York City (1966–1988)

- Interior of Maxwell's Plum

- Location within Manhattan Location within New York City

Restaurant information
- Established: April 1, 1966
- Closed: July 10, 1988
- Previous owner: Warner LeRoy
- Location: 1181 First Avenue (at 64th Street), Manhattan, New York City, 10065, United States
- Coordinates: 40.762960°N 73.959770°W

Maxwell's Plum was a bar at 1181 First Avenue, at the intersection with 64th Street, on the Upper East Side of Manhattan in New York City. A 1988 New York Times article described it as a "flamboyant restaurant and singles bar that, more than any place of its kind, symbolized two social revolutions of the 1960s – sex and food". Owned by Warner LeRoy, it closed abruptly on July 10, 1988.

It was opened on April 1, 1966, by Warner LeRoy, son of Hollywood producer Mervyn LeRoy (The Wizard of Oz, Quo Vadis, Mister Roberts). Initially it was part of his theater, providing a cafe with good wine lists and hamburgers for the 1960s swinging singles crowd. Maxwell's Plum became a favorite gathering spot, and in 1969 the theater was closed to expand the café with a luxury dining room reminiscent of Maxim's in Paris. Patrons enjoyed the mixed experience of a boulevard café or a majestic second-floor restaurant that overlooked the first-floor singles bar. Maxwell's Plum rose rapidly to be one of the city's top venues, grossing over $5 million by the 1970s, equivalent to $20 million when adjusted for inflation, with alcohol sales contributing more than a third.

It was famous for its eclectic menu ranging from chili and hamburgers to wild boar and caviar, along with its first class service without snobbery, and its "outlandish Art Nouveau decor – kaleidoscopic stained-glass ceilings and walls, Tiffany lamps galore, a menagerie of ceramic animals, etched glass and cascades of crystal."

During the first phase of Maxwell's Plum (when the theater was open), Warner LeRoy had two original Toulouse-Lautrec paintings in frames screwed into the hall wall leading from the mezzanine to the upstairs toilets. Two large Tiffany lamps hung over the two large tables on the mezzanine level, three steps up from the floor level bar and sitting area.

Maxwell's Plum soon served over 1,200 customers a day, including such celebrities as Warren Beatty, Bill Blass, Cary Grant, Richard Rodgers and Barbra Streisand, and becoming what The New York Times called "a favorite watering hole for the 'swinging singles' set." Other celebrity customers included Vince Edwards (who played Dr. Ben Casey), Buddy Hackett, Myrna Loy and New York Giants football players (who sat in the second-floor area).

A second location opened in 1981 in San Francisco, at a cost of $7 million, then soon closed. LeRoy built Potomac, a similarly themed 850-seat restaurant in Washington, D.C., the largest in the city's history, which also soon closed after opening at a cost of $9 million.

LeRoy closed the Plum in 1988 when he sold the First Avenue building. In January 1989, the furnishings and contents of Maxwell's Plum were auctioned off. At the auction, the Tribeca Grill acquired the Plum's large island bar.
