= Moo Moo Restaurant =

Restaurant chain Russia

Moo-Moo

Restaurant information
- Established: 2000
- Location: Moscow, Russia
- Website: https://www.cafemumu.ru/

Moo-Moo (Russian: Му-Му) is a chain of buffet restaurants in Russia.

Moo-Moo operates as a cafeteria-style restaurant and as such can be considered a fast food restaurant. The entire menu is self-service, and includes a wide variety of meats, including shashlik, as well as vegetables, soups, breads, and desserts. Most Moo-Moo restaurants operate in the Moscow area, including Arbat. Moo-Moo restaurants are decorated with a black-and-white cow motif. Continuing the theme, every meal purchased comes with a piece of milk-flavoured candy wrapped in a black-and-white cow wrapper.

The restaurant is famous for its specialty meals inspired by works of Russian literature. It attracted much controversy in 2012 for its seagull dish (inspired by Anton Chekhov's The Seagull).

The first restaurant opened on February 10, 2000, near the Frunzenskaya metro station. The network of the cafe belongs to the Russian businessman Andrei Dellos; as the founder, he planned to create a fast food on exclusively Russian products and Russian recipes.

As of July 2022, 38 restaurants are in operation: 35 within Moscow and 3 in the Moscow region.

== See also ==
- List of Russian restaurants
