= Hill of the Buddha =

Buddhist shrine in Sapporo, Japan

Coordinates: 42.92056°N 141.36275°E

- 頭大仏
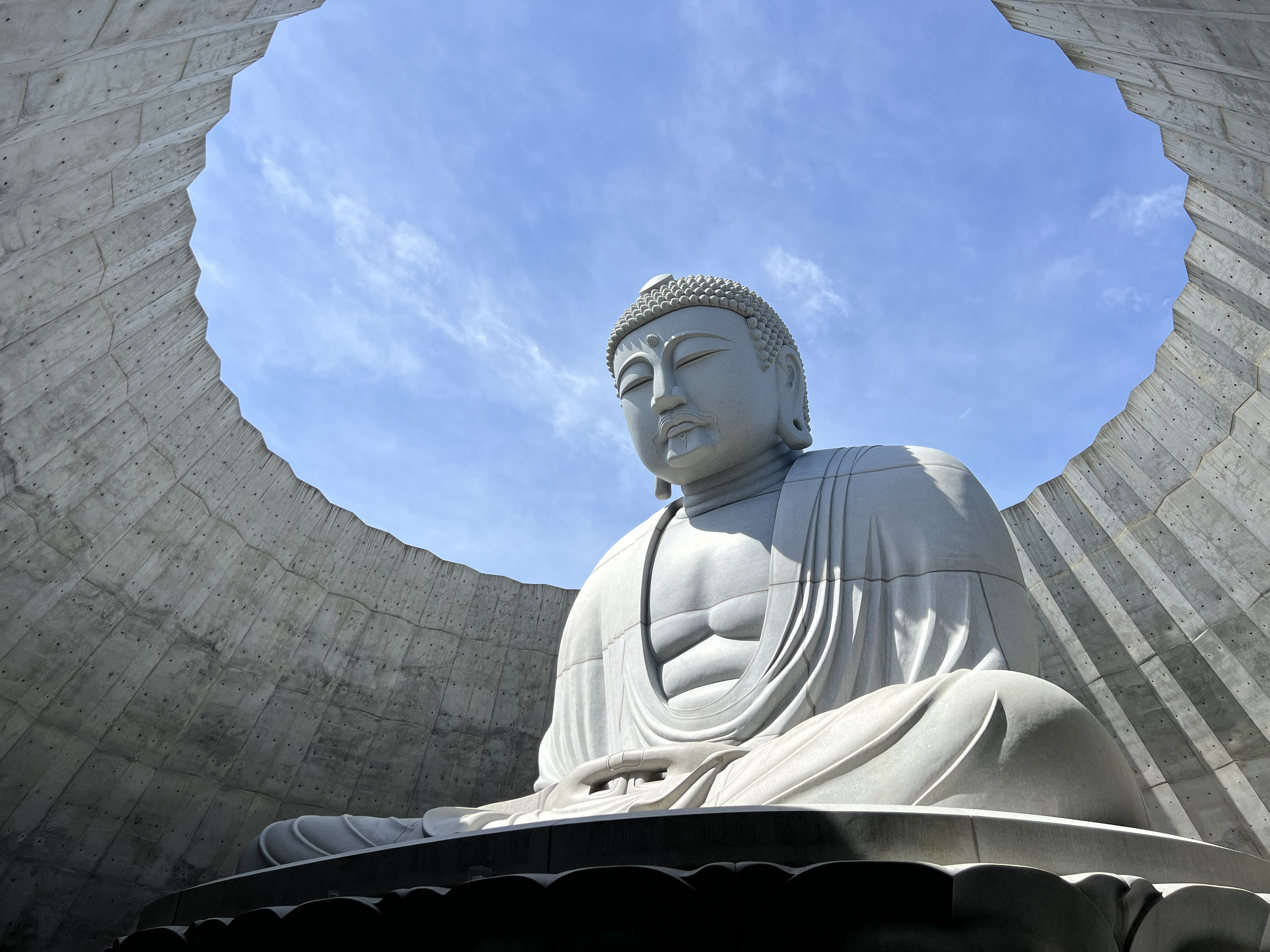

General information
- Location: Makomanai Takino Cemetery, Sapporo, Hokkaido, Japan
- Opened: December 2015

Design and construction
- Architect(s): Tadao Ando

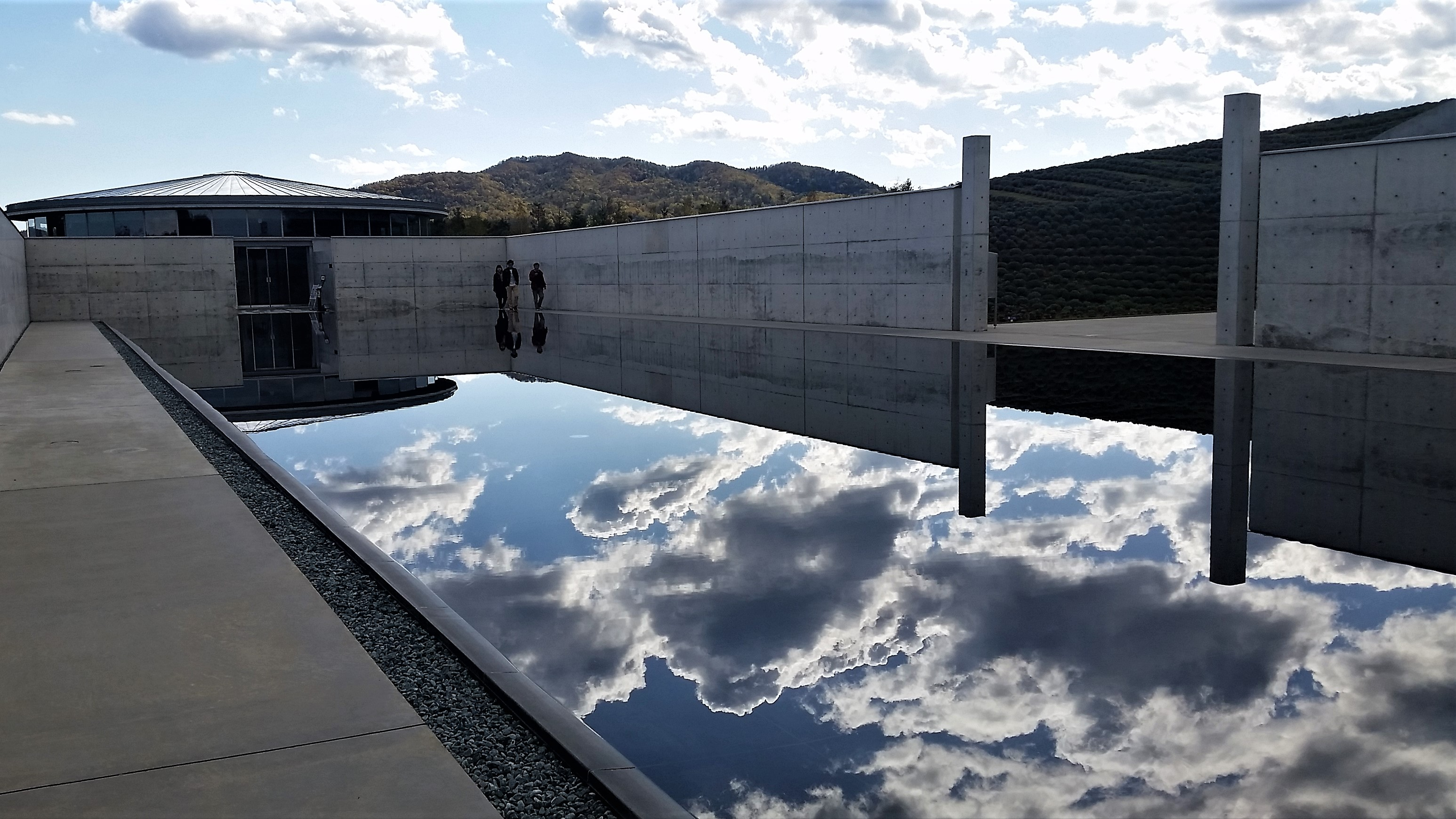
Reflecting pool

The Hill of the Buddha (Japanese: 頭大仏, Hepburn: Atama Daibutsu, "Large Buddha's Head") is a Buddhist shrine at Makomanai Takino Cemetery (Japanese: 真駒内滝野霊園) in Sapporo, Japan, designed by Japanese modernist architect Tadao Ando. The shrine features a 13.5 m (44 ft) tall statue of the Buddha encircled by an artificial hill rotunda planted with 150,000 lavender plants.

The design incorporated the pre-existing Buddha statue, which was sculpted circa 2000 and stood solitary. On approaching the statue, only the head sticks out from the hill, and the shrine is entered through a tunnel for a full view of the statue inside of the open rotunda. The building opened in December 2015.
