= Fall of man =

Adam and Eve's loss of innocence in the Abrahamic religions

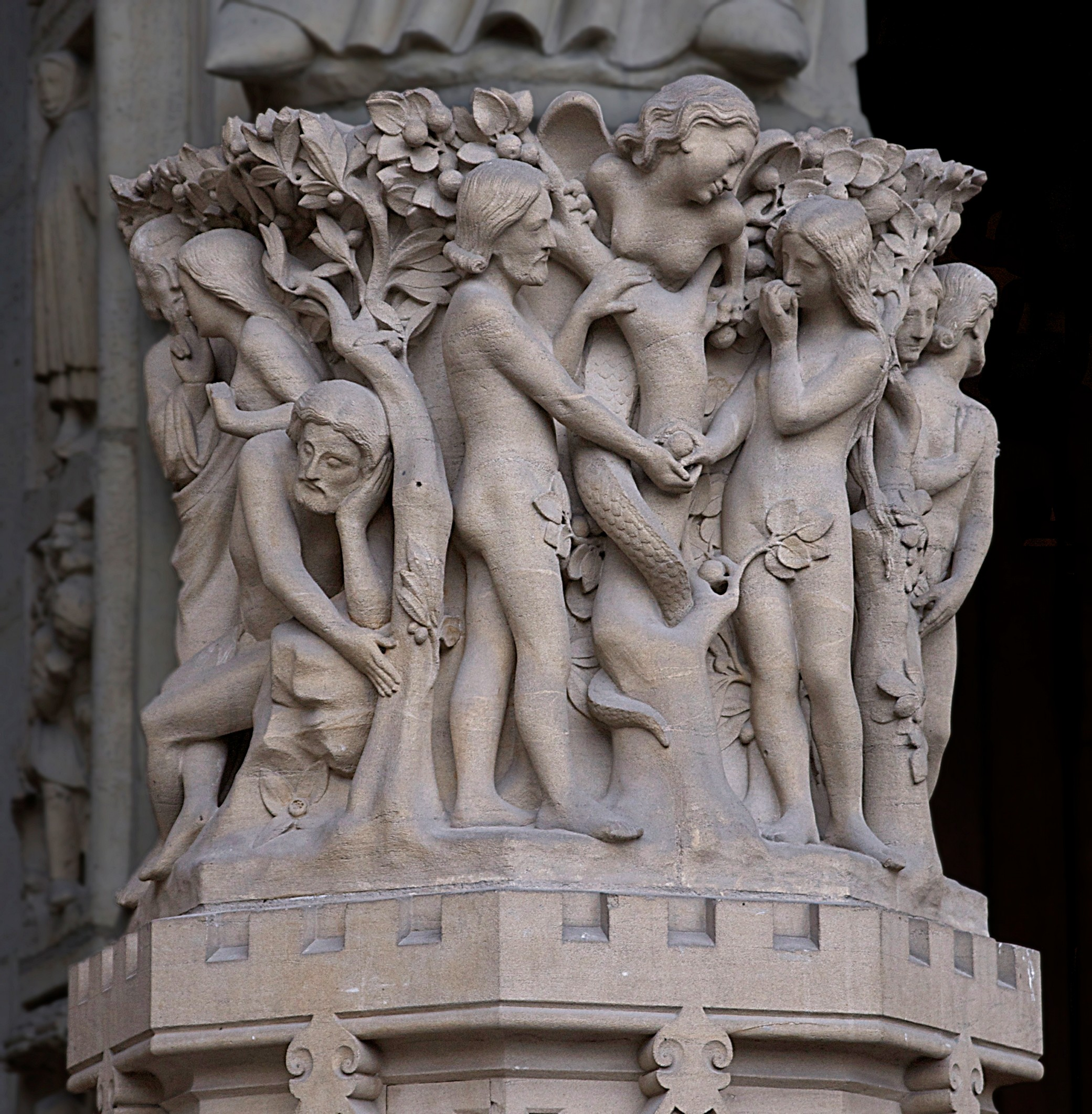
Adam, Eve, and a female serpent at the entrance to Notre Dame Cathedral in Paris, France. The depiction of the serpent as a mirror of Eve was common in earlier Christian iconography, which portrayed women as the source of the original sin and responsible for the fall of man.

The fall of man, the fall of Adam, or simply the Fall, is a term used in Christianity to describe the transition of the first man and woman from a state of innocent obedience to God to a state of guilty disobedience. The doctrine of the Fall comes from a biblical interpretation of Genesis, chapters 1–3. At first, Adam and Eve lived with God in the Garden of Eden, but the serpent tempted them into eating the fruit from the tree of knowledge of good and evil, which God had forbidden. After doing so, they became ashamed of their nakedness and God expelled them from the Garden to prevent them from eating the fruit of the tree of life and becoming immortal.

In Nicene Christianity, the doctrine of the Fall is closely related to that of original sin or ancestral sin. Nicene Christians believe that the Fall brought sin into the world, corrupting the entire natural world, including human nature, causing all humans to be born into original sin, a state from which they cannot attain eternal life without the grace of God. The Eastern Orthodox Church accepts the concept of the Fall but rejects the idea that the guilt of original sin is passed down through generations, based in part on the passage Ezekiel 18:20, which says a son is not guilty of the sins of his father.

Reformed Protestants believe that Jesus gave his life as a sacrifice for the elect, that they may be redeemed from their sin. Lapsarianism, understanding the logical order of God's decrees in relation to the Fall, is divided into two categories: supralapsarian (prelapsarian, pre-lapsarian or antelapsarian, before the Fall) and infralapsarian (sublapsarian or postlapsarian, after the Fall).

The narrative of the Garden of Eden and the fall of humanity constitute a mythological tradition shared by all the Abrahamic religions, with a presentation more or less symbolic of Judeo-Christian morals and religious beliefs, which had an overwhelming impact on human sexuality, gender roles, and sex differences both in the Western and Islamic civilizations. Unlike Christianity, the other major Abrahamic religions, Judaism and Islam, do not have a concept of "original sin", and instead have developed varying other interpretations of the Eden narrative. (Note: Attributed to multiple sources:)

== Etymology ==
The phrase fall of man does not appear in Jewish scripture. According to Easton's Bible Dictionary, the term probably originates from the Book of Wisdom, a Greek work generally dated to the mid-first century BC, or to the reign of Caligula (AD 37–41).

== Genesis 3 ==
The doctrine of the fall of man is extrapolated from the traditional Christian exegesis of Genesis 3. According to the biblical narrative, God created Adam and Eve, the first man and woman in the chronology of the Bible. God placed them in the Garden of Eden and forbade them to eat fruit from the tree of the knowledge of good and evil. Questioning God's command against eating the fruit, the serpent tempted Eve to eat fruit from the forbidden tree, which she shared with Adam, and they immediately became ashamed of their nakedness. Subsequently, God banished Adam and Eve from the Garden of Eden, condemned Adam to work in order to get what he needed to live and condemned Eve to give birth in pain, and placed cherubim to guard the entrance, so that Adam and Eve would never eat from the "tree of life".

The Book of Jubilees, an apocryphal Jewish work written during the Second Temple period, gives time frames for the events that led to the fall of man by stating that the serpent convinced Eve to eat the fruit on the 17th day, of the 2nd month, in the 8th year after Adam's creation (3:17). It also states that they were removed from the Garden on the new moon of the 4th month of that year (3:33).

== Traditional interpretations ==
=== Immortality ===
Christian exegetes of Genesis 2:17 ("for in the day that you eat of it you shall die", also known as the "commandment to life"), have applied the day-year principle to explain how Adam died within a day. Psalms 90:4, 2 Peter 3:8, and Jubilees 4:40 explain that, to God, one day is equivalent to a thousand years and thus Adam died within that same "day". The Greek Septuagint, on the other hand, has "day" translated into the Greek word for a twenty-four-hour period (ἡμέρα, hēméra).

According to Meredith Kline, the death threatened in Genesis 2:17 is "not physical death but eternal perdition (later called 'second death')." This is because, in covenant theology, the "curse" aspect of the commandment to life is balanced by its blessing, which is "glorified eternal life", symbolised by the tree of life (Genesis 2:9) and the Sabbath (Genesis 2:2).

According to the Genesis narrative, during the antediluvian age, human longevity approached a millennium, such as the case of Adam who lived 930 years. Thus, to "die" has been interpreted as to become mortal. However, the grammar does not support this reading, nor does the narrative: Adam and Eve are expelled from the Garden lest they eat of the second tree, the tree of life, and gain immortality.

=== Original sin ===
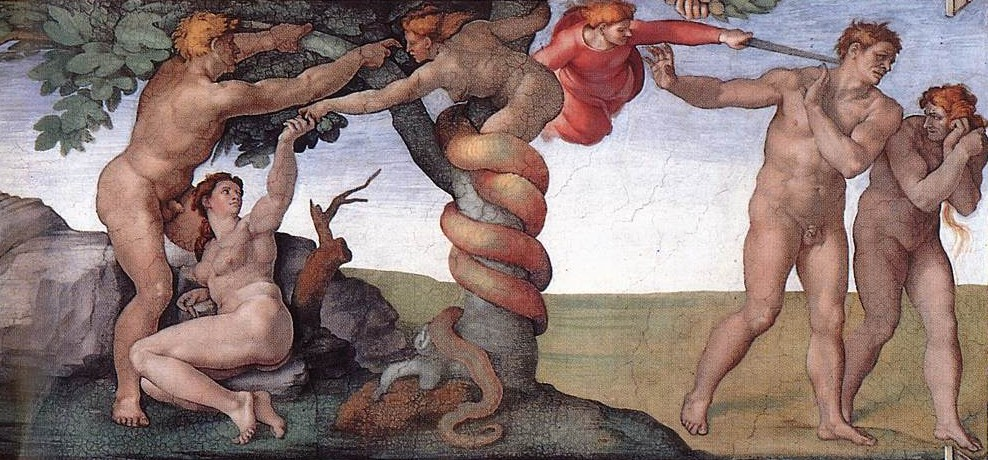
The Fall and Expulsion from Paradise, fresco painted by Michelangelo in the Sistine Chapel, Vatican City (1510–1564)

==== Roman Catholicism ====
The Catechism of the Catholic Church says: "The account of the fall in Genesis 3 uses figurative language, but affirms […] that the whole of human history is marked by the original fault freely committed by our first parents." St Bede and others, especially Thomas Aquinas, said that the fall of Adam and Eve brought "four wounds" to human nature. They are original sin (lack of sanctifying grace and original justice), concupiscence (the soul's passions are no longer ordered perfectly to the soul's intellect), physical frailty and death, and darkened intellect and ignorance. These negated or diminished the gifts of God to Adam and Eve of original justice or sanctifying grace, integrity, immortality and infused knowledge. This first sin was "transmitted" by Adam and Eve to all of their descendants as original sin, causing humans to be "subject to ignorance, suffering and the dominion of death, and inclined to sin."

In light of modern scripture scholarship, the future Pope Benedict XVI stated in 1986 that: "In the Genesis story […] sin is not spoken of in general as an abstract possibility but as a deed, as the sin of a particular person, Adam, who stands at the origin of humankind and with whom the history of sin begins. The account tells us that sin begets sin, and that therefore all the sins of history are interlinked. Theology refers to this state of affairs by the certainly misleading and imprecise term 'original sin.'" Although the state of corruption, inherited by humans after the primaeval event of original sin, is clearly called guilt or sin, it is understood as a sin acquired by the unity of all humans in Adam rather than a personal responsibility of humanity. In the Catechism of the Catholic Church, even children partake in the effects of the sin of Adam, but not in the responsibility of original sin, as sin is always a personal act. Baptism is considered to erase original sin, though the effects on human nature remain, and for this reason, the Catholic Church baptizes even infants who have not committed any personal sin.

==== Protestantism ====
In Covenant theology, the first man, Adam, is said to have failed to fulfill the commandment to life and the Covenant of Works, which is summarized in Genesis 2:15–17. In verse 15, humanity is to "dress" and "keep" the Garden of Eden (KJV), or to "work it" and "take care of it" (NIV). In verse 17, God gives the "focal probationary proscription", that Adam must not eat of the tree of the knowledge of good and evil, and a curse is attached if the proscription is transgressed, which is spiritual death. The Covenant required 'perfect and personal obedience', but Adam freely and willfully transgressed the commandment by accepting Satan's lie in Genesis 3:4–5, demonstrating pride and a rejection of God's authority as Creator, preferring his own will to God's, leading to a corruption of his whole nature, which extended to his progeny, as is described in Article 14 of the Belgic Confession.

We believe that God created man out of the dust of the earth, and made and formed him after His own image and likeness, good, righteous, and holy, capable in all things to will, agreeably to the will of God. But being in honour, he understood it not, neither knew his excellency, but wilfully subjected himself to sin, and consequently to death, and the curse, giving ear to the words of the devil. For the commandment of life, which he had received, he transgressed: and by sin separated himself from God, who was his true life, having corrupted his whole nature; whereby he made himself liable to corporal and spiritual death. And being thus become wicked, perverse, and corrupt in all his ways, he hath lost all his excellent gifts, which he had received from God, and only retained a few remains thereof, which, however, are sufficient to leave man without excuse; for all the light which is in us is changed into darkness, as the Scriptures teach us, saying: The light shineth in darkness, and the darkness comprehendeth it not: [John 1:5] where St. John calleth men darkness.

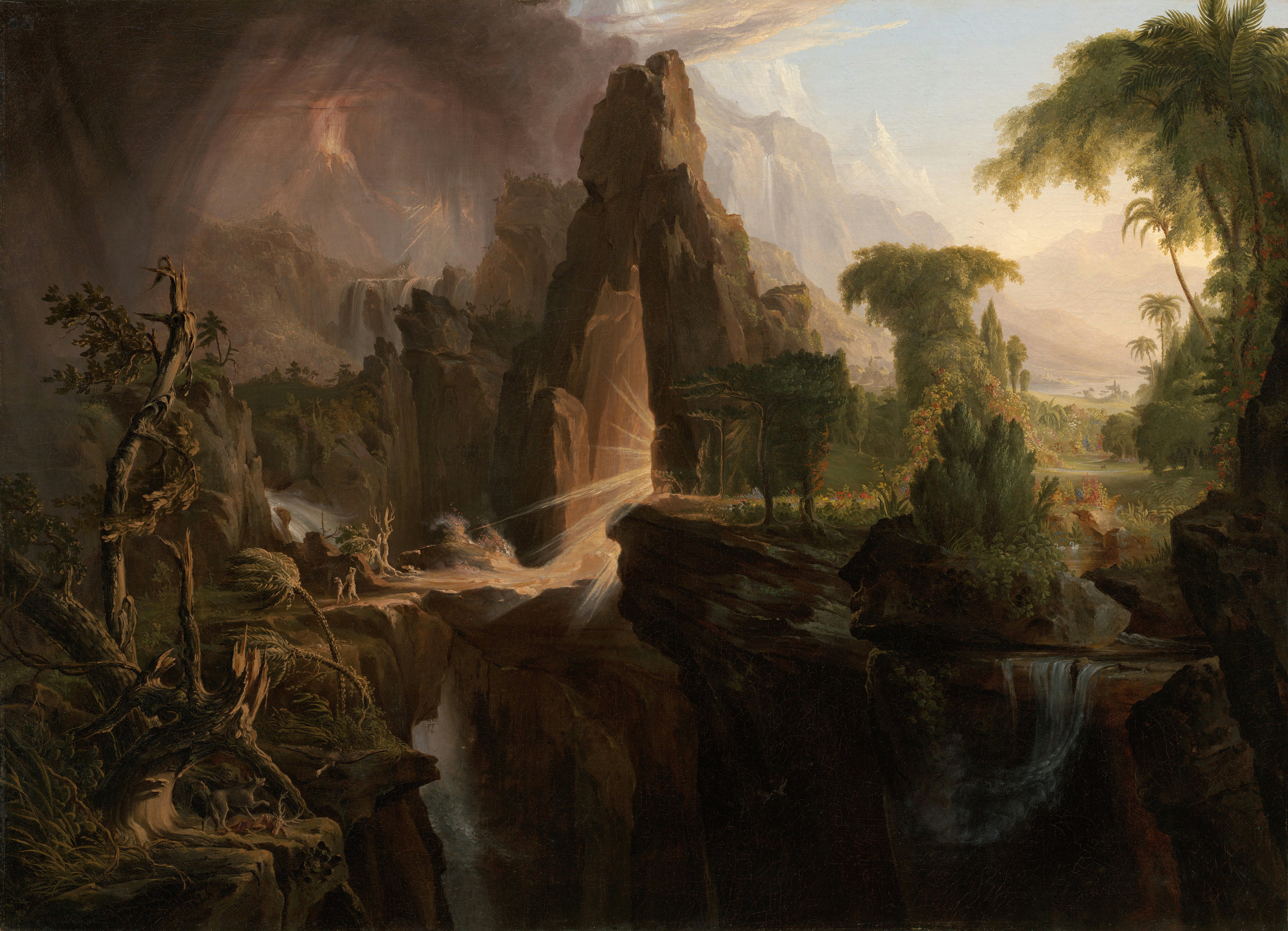
Expulsion from the Garden of Eden, 1828 oil-on-canvas painting by Thomas Cole (1801–1848), now in the collection of the Museum of Fine Arts in Boston, United States.

By the inverse to the concept of imputed righteousness, Adam, as the federal head of humanity, brought condemnation and death to all by his violation of the commandment to life. Kline justifies this interpretation by referencing Romans 5:12–19, in which it says "For if by one man's offence death reigned by one; much more they which receive abundance of grace and of the gift of righteousness shall reign in life by one, Jesus Christ." Therefore as by the offence of one judgment came upon all men to condemnation; even so by the righteousness of one the free gift came upon all men unto justification of life. For as by one man's disobedience many were made sinners, so by the obedience of one shall many be made righteous." In saying that, as a result of the Fall, man has become "wicked, perverse, and corrupt in all his ways," the Confession expresses the doctrine of total depravity, which means that man is completely helpless and unable to rescue himself from sin, and "cannot inherit the kingdom of God" (1 Corinthians 15:50) but must be rescued by the second Adam, Jesus Christ, who is from heaven, as it says in 1 Corinthians 15:22, "For as in Adam all die, even so in Christ shall all be made alive."

Indeed, Genesis 3:15 ("And I will put enmity between thee and the woman, and between thy seed and her seed; it shall bruise thy head, and thou shalt bruise his heel"), known as the protevangelium, is interpreted as a gracious declaration of the Covenant of Grace, in which God effects reconciliation with humanity and vanquishes the devil through Christ's atonement, which delivers from sin. This covenant is symbolically sealed when it is said that God "clothed" Adam and Eve's nakedness, due to which they were ashamed. However, man was defiled and had to be expelled from the Garden of Eden, with the earth "cursed" for his sake, in an overthrow of man's previous "dominion" over the earth which was gifted to him in Genesis 1:26. In Genesis 3:24, "cherubim" and "a flaming sword" guard the tree of life, access to which is only restored when Christ "vicariously suffered the sword of judgment on the tree of death and so reopened the way to the tree of life."

==== Eastern Orthodoxy ====
Eastern Orthodox Christianity rejects the idea that the guilt of original sin is passed down through generations. It bases its teaching in part on Ezekiel 18:20, which says a son is not guilty of the sins of his father. The Church teaches that, in addition to their conscience and tendency to do good, men and women are born with a tendency to sin due to the fallen condition of the world. It follows Maximus the Confessor and others in characterising the change in human nature as the introduction of a "deliberative will" (θέλημα γνωμικόν) in opposition to the "natural will" (θέλημα φυσικόν) created by God which tends toward the good. Thus, according to Paul the Apostle in his epistle to the Romans, non-Christians can still act according to their conscience.

Eastern Orthodoxy believes that, while everyone bears the consequences of the first sin (that is, death), only Adam and Eve are guilty of that sin. Adam's sin is not comprehended only as disobedience to God's commandment, but as a change in man's hierarchy of values from theocentricism to anthropocentrism, driven by the object of his lust, outside of God, in this case the tree which was seen to be "good for food", and something "to be desired" (see also theosis, seeking union with God).

=== Meta-historical fall ===
The biblical fall of man is also understood by some Christian theologians, especially those belonging to the Eastern Orthodox tradition, as a reality outside of empirical history that affects the entire history of the universe. This concept of a meta-historical fall (also called metaphysical, supramundane, or atemporal) has been most recently expounded by the Eastern Orthodox theologians David Bentley Hart, John Behr, and Sergei Bulgakov, but it has roots in the writings of several early Church Fathers, especially Origen and Maximus the Confessor. Bulgakov writes in his 1939 book The Bride of the Lamb:

Empirical history begins precisely with the fall, which is its starting premise. But this beginning of history lies beyond empirical being and cannot be included in its chronology. …[With the] narrative in Genesis 3, …an event is described that lies beyond our history, although at its boundary. Being connected with our history, this event inwardly permeates it.

American philosopher and Eastern Orthodox theologian David Bentley Hart has written about the concept of an atemporal fall in his 2005 book The Doors of the Sea, as well as in his 2018 essay The Devil's March: Creatio ex nihilo, the Problem of Evil, and a Few Dostoyevskian Meditations.

=== Subordination ===
In the subordination exegesis of the Fall, the natural consequences of sin entering the human race were prophesied by God to Eve in Genesis 3:16: the husband "will rule over you". This interpretation is reinforced by comments in the First Epistle to Timothy, where the author gives a rationale for directing that a woman (NIV: possibly "wife"):

...should learn in quietness and full submission. I do not permit a woman to teach or to assume authority over a man [NIV: possibly "husband"]; she must be quiet. For Adam was formed first, then Eve. And Adam was not the one deceived; it was the woman who was deceived and became a sinner.

— 1 Timothy 2:11–14

Therefore, some interpretations of these passages from Genesis 3 and 1 Timothy 2 have developed a view that women are considered as bearers of Eve's guilt and that the woman's conduct in the fall is the primary reason for her universal, timeless, subordinate relationship to the man.

Alternatively, Richard and Catherine Clark Kroeger argue: "there is a serious theological contradiction in telling a woman that when she comes to faith in Christ, her personal sins are forgiven but she must continue to be punished for the sin of Eve." They maintain that judgmental comments against women in reference to Eve are a "dangerous interpretation, in terms both of biblical theology and of the call to Christian commitment". They reason that "if the Apostle Paul was forgiven for what he did ignorantly in unbelief", including persecuting and murdering Christians, "and thereafter was given a ministry, why would the same forgiveness and ministry be denied women" (for the sins of their foremother, Eve). Addressing that, the Kroegers conclude that Paul was referring to the promise of Genesis 3:15 that through the defeat of Satan on the cross of Jesus Christ, the woman's child (Jesus) would crush the serpent's head, but the serpent would only bruise the heel of her child.

== Other traditions ==
=== Gnosticism ===
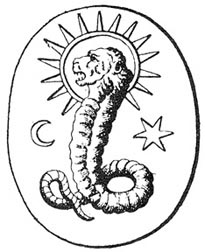
A lion-faced, serpentine deity found on a Gnostic gem in Bernard de Montfaucon's L'antiquité expliquée et représentée en figures may be a depiction of the Demiurge.

Gnosticism originated in the late 1st century CE in non-rabbinical Jewish and early Christian sects. In the formation of Christianity, various sectarian groups, labeled "gnostics" by their opponents, emphasised spiritual knowledge (gnosis) of the divine spark within, over faith (pistis) in the teachings and traditions of the various communities of Christians. Gnosticism presents a distinction between the highest, unknowable God, and the Demiurge, "creator" of the material universe. The Gnostics considered the most essential part of the process of salvation to be this personal knowledge, in contrast to faith as an outlook in their worldview along with faith in the ecclesiastical authority.

In Gnosticism, the biblical serpent in the Garden of Eden was praised and thanked for bringing knowledge (gnosis) to Adam and Eve and thereby freeing them from the malevolent Demiurge's control. Gnostic Christian doctrines rely on a dualistic cosmology that implies the eternal conflict between good and evil, and a conception of the serpent as the liberating savior and bestower of knowledge to humankind opposed to the Demiurge or creator god, identified with the Hebrew God of the Old Testament. Gnostic Christians considered the Hebrew God of the Old Testament as the evil, false god and creator of the material universe, and the Unknown God of the Gospel, the father of Jesus Christ and creator of the spiritual world, as the true, good God. In the Archontic, Sethian, and Ophite systems, Yaldabaoth (Yahweh) is regarded as the malevolent Demiurge and false god of the Old Testament who generated the material universe and keeps the souls trapped in physical bodies, imprisoned in the world full of pain and suffering that he created.

However, not all Gnostic movements regarded the creator of the material universe as inherently evil or malevolent. For instance, Valentinians believed that the Demiurge is merely an ignorant and incompetent creator, trying to fashion the world as good as he can, but lacking the proper power to maintain its goodness. All Gnostics were regarded as heretics by the proto-orthodox Early Church Fathers.

=== Islam ===
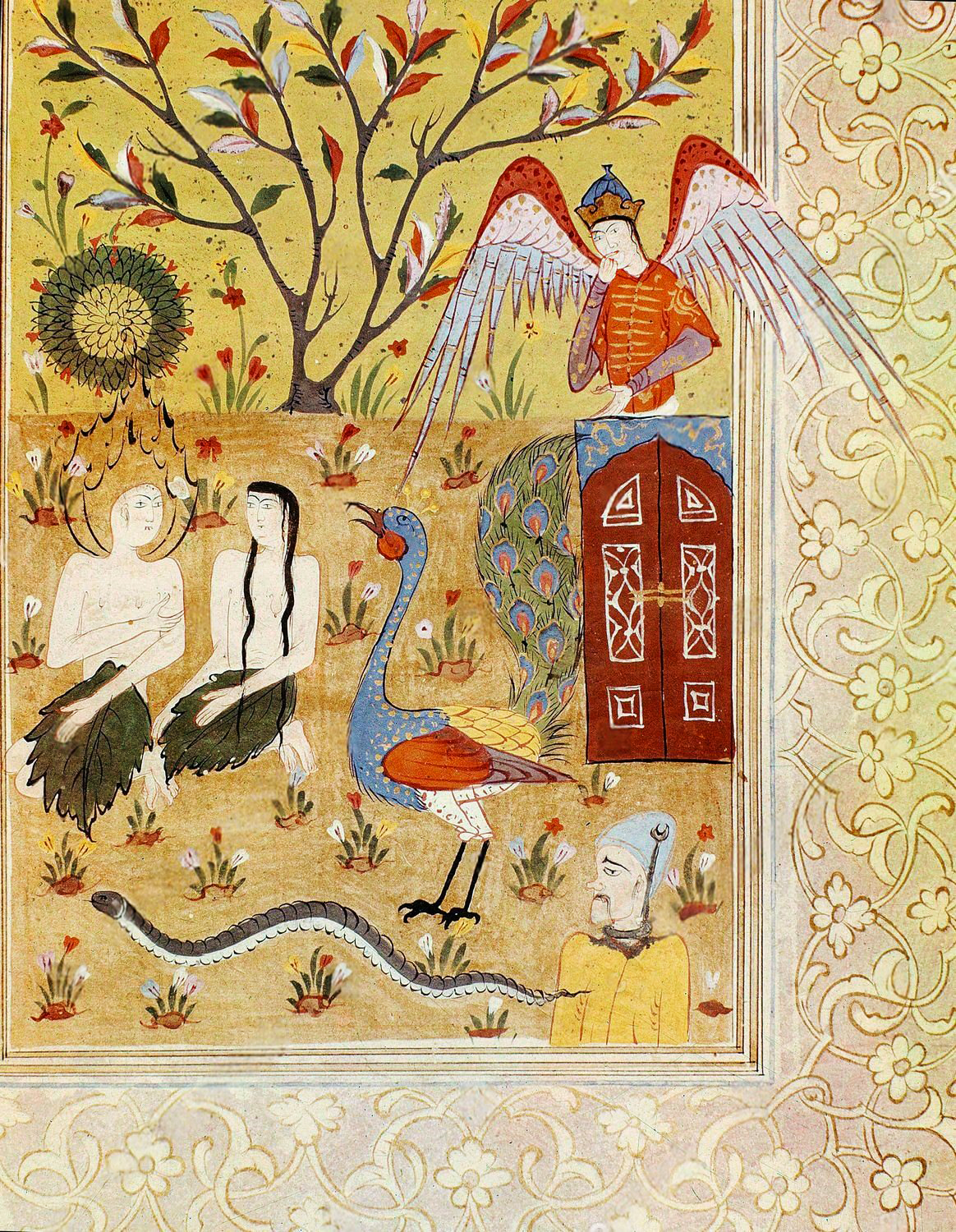
Persian miniature depicting the expulsion of Adam and Eve, observed by the angel Riḍwan, the Serpent, the Peacock, and Iblīs.

In Islam, it is believed that Adam (Ādam) and Eve (Ḥawwā) were misled by Iblīs (otherwise referred to as al-Shayṭān, lit. 'the Devil'), who tempted them with the promise of immortality and a kingdom that never decays. Iblīs said: "Your Lord has forbidden this tree to you only to prevent you from becoming angels or immortals.". Adam and Eve had been previously warned of Shayṭān's scheming against them, and had been commanded by God to avoid the tree of immortality that Shayṭān referred to. Although God had reminded them that there was enough provision for them: "Here it is guaranteed that you will never go hungry or unclothed, nor will you ˹ever˺ suffer from thirst or ˹the sun’s˺ heat.", they ultimately gave in to Shayṭān's temptation and partook of the tree anyway. Following this sin, "their nakedness was exposed to them, prompting them to cover themselves with leaves from Paradise". Subsequently, they were sent down from Paradise (Jannah) onto the Earth with "enmity one to another". However, God also gave them the assurance that "when guidance comes to you from Me, whoever follows My guidance will neither go astray ˹in this life˺ nor suffer ˹in the next˺."

Muslim scholars can be divided into two groups regarding the reason behind Adam's fall: the first point of view argues that Adam sinned out of his own free will, and only became a prophet later, after he was cast out of paradise and asked for forgiveness. They adhere to the doctrine according to which moral infallibility/immunity from sin (‘iṣmah) is a quality attributable to prophets only after they have been sent on a mission. According to the second point of view, Adam was predestined by God's will to eat from the forbidden tree, because God planned to set Adam and his progeny on Earth from the beginning and thus installed Adam's fall. For this reason, many Muslim exegetes do not regard Adam and Eve's expulsion from paradise as a punishment for disobedience or a result from abused free will on their part, but rather as part of God's wisdom (ḥikmah) and plan for humanity to experience the full range of his attributes, his love, forgiveness, and power to his creation. By their former abode in paradise, they can hope for return during their lifetime. Unlike Iblīs (al-Shayṭān), Adam asked for forgiveness for his transgression, despite God being the ultimate cause of his Fall. For that reason, God bestowed mercy upon Adam and his children. Some Muslim scholars view Adam as an image for his descendants: humans sin, become aware of it, repent for their transgressions (tawba), and return to God. According to this interpretation, Adam embodies humanity and his Fall shows humans how to act whenever they sin.

Within the Shīʿīte branch of Islam, Muslim followers of the Alawite sect believe that their souls were once luminous stars worshipping ʿAlī ibn Abī Ṭālib in a world of light, but that upon committing sins of pride they were banished from their former state and forced to transmigrate in the world of matter.

=== Agricultural revolution ===
Authors such as Isaac Asimov, Daniel Hillel, and Daniel Quinn suggest that some of the Genesis 3 narrative's symbolism may correlate to the experience of the agricultural revolution. Hillel writes: "The expulsion from the Garden of Eden is a folk memory of the beginning of agriculture. With that transition, humans no longer dwelled idyllically in a parkland, feeding on wild fruits or animals, but had begun the toilsome cultivation of cereals." This interpretation is not widely held in academic theology nor accepted as a historical fact, but appears in ecological, anthropological, and literary discussions that explore the societal transformations associated with the Neolithic era.

The serpent of the Genesis narrative may represent seasonal changes and renewal, as with the symbolism of Sumerian, Egyptian, and other creation myths. In Mesoamerican creation myths, Quetzalcoatl, a feathered serpent agricultural deity, is associated with learning as well as renewal.

== Literature and art ==
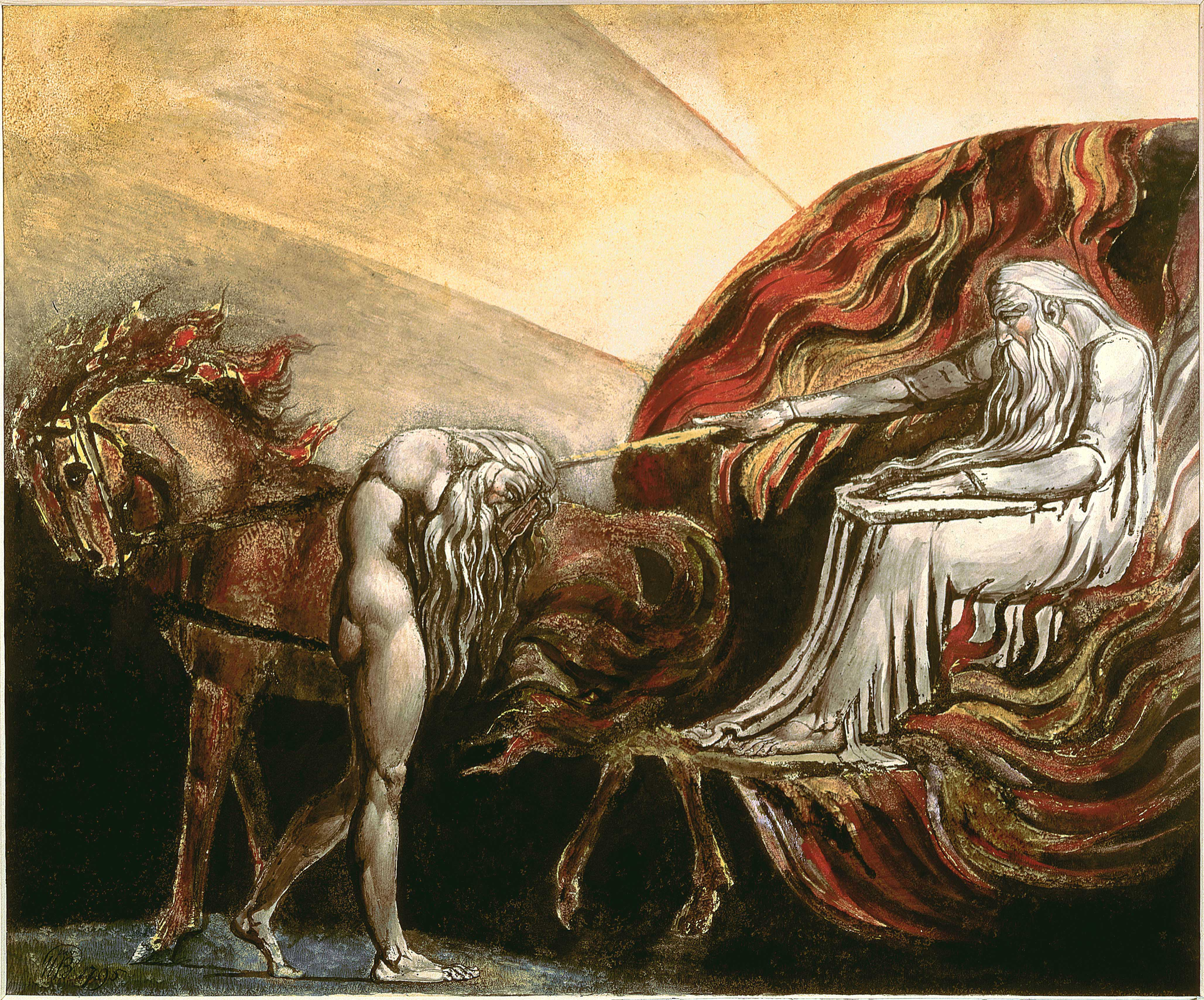
William Blake's color printing of God Judging Adam original composed in 1795. This print is currently held by the Tate Collection. In the biblical story, God's judgement results in the fall of man.

The fall of man has been depicted many times in art, including in Albrecht Dürer's Adam and Eve (1504) and Titian's The Fall of Man (c. 1550).

In William Shakespeare's Henry V (1599), the King describes the betrayal of Lord Scroop – a friend since childhood – as being "like another fall of man", referring to the loss of his own faith and innocence the treason has caused.

In the novel Perelandra (1943) by C. S. Lewis, the theme of the fall is explored in the context of a new Garden of Eden with a new, green-skinned Adam and Eve on the planet Venus, and with the protagonist – the Cambridge scholar Dr. Ransom – transported there and given the mission of thwarting Satan and preventing a new fall.

In the novel The Fall (1956) by Albert Camus, the theme of the fall is enunciated through the first-person account given in post-war Amsterdam, in a bar called "Mexico City." Confessing to an acquaintance, the protagonist, Jean-Baptiste Clamence, describes the haunting consequence of his refusal to rescue a woman who had jumped from a bridge to her death. The dilemmas of modern Western conscience and the sacramental themes of baptism and grace are explored.

J. R. R. Tolkien included as a note to his comments about the Dialogue of Finrod and Andreth (published posthumously in 1993) the Tale of Adanel that is a reimagining of the fall of man inside his Middle-earth's mythos. The story presented Melkor seducing the first Men by making them worship him instead of Eru Ilúvatar, leading to the loss of the "Edenic" condition of the human race. The story is part of Morgoth's Ring.

In both Daniel Quinn's Ishmael (1992) and The Story of B (1996) novels, it is proposed that the story of the fall of man was first thought up by another culture watching the development of the now-dominant totalitarian agriculturalist culture.

In Philip Pullman's His Dark Materials series (1995, 1997, 2000), the fall is presented in a positive light, as it is the moment at which human beings achieve self-awareness, knowledge, and freedom. Pullman believes that it is not worth being innocent if the price is ignorance.

The novel Lord of the Flies explores the fall of man. The storyline depicts young, innocent children who turn into savages when they are stranded on a desert island. Lord of the Flies was originally named Strangers from Within, also showing his views of human nature.

The theme is also frequently depicted in historical European art. Lucas van Leyden, a Dutch engraver and painter during the Renaissance period, created several different woodcuts featuring Adam and Eve (two were part of his Power of Women series).

James Joyce’s novel Finnegans Wake has several references to the Fall of Man, including Tim Finnegan’s fall in the beginning of the novel (causing the first ‘thunder word’) and the character HCE’s unclear crime in Phoenix Park, a parallel of original sin.

== See also ==
- Book of the Heavenly Cow
- Deal with the Devil
- Ningishzida
- Paradise Lost by John Milton
