= The Holy =

2002 novel by Daniel Quinn

- First edition
- Author: Daniel Quinn
- Language: English
- Published: September 2002, Context Books
- Publication place: United States
- Media type: Print (hardback & paperback)
- Pages: 416 p. (first edition, hardcover), 432 p. (paperback)
- ISBN: 1-893956-30-X (first edition, hardcover), ISBN 1-58195-214-7 (paperback)
- OCLC: 50132229

The Holy is a novel by bestselling author Daniel Quinn (who wrote the novel Ishmael), published in October 2002 by Context Books, about a man's quest to find ancient "false gods". The novel's genre is not easily classifiable but has elements of horror, thriller and new age mysticism about it, together with some coherent themes interlaced regarding consumerism, the environment, the sacredness of nature and the pitfalls of religious faith.

== Plot summary ==
Aaron, a wealthy amateur scholar, hires sexagenarian private investigator Howard, whom he meets at a chess club in Chicago to which they both belong, to investigate the gods Baal, Ashtoroth and Moloch, that were worshipped for centuries in Israel during a period of antiquity when the God of Abraham had fallen into disfavor. As Aaron says to Howard while proposing the task, referring to story of Exodus of the Old Testament:

Nowhere does it say they don't exist ... What it says is they're false gods ... gods not to be trusted.

Although Howard initially turns down the case, thinking Aaron is either crazy or a fool, Aaron is dogged, and increases his offer of reward until Howard eventually relents. However, Howard only agrees to work on the problem for one month to test whether any inroads can be made into the peculiar case.

It is indeed a problem — how to even begin investigating a trail that is centuries cold. Howard turns to a psychic for help, who using a Tarot card reading, sets Howard on a path which leads him to a young boy named Tim from Indiana, in whom the gods have taken an interest. Tim's father, who was in the midst of a mid-life crisis, has recently disappeared. Howard helps Tim in his quest to locate and determine what has become of his father. In their quest they are dogged by supernatural events that are eventually revealed as the workings of the gods who may be "false," but who are, nevertheless, real.

== Literary significance & criticism ==
- The Holy book review

== Release details ==
- 2002, USA, Context Books ISBN 1-893956-30-X, Pub date ? September 2002, hardcover (First edition)
- 2002, USA, Zoland Books ISBN 1-58195-214-7, Pub date 3 January 2006, paperback
