= Beyond Civilization =

1999 book by Daniel Quinn

- First edition
- Author: Daniel Quinn
- Language: English
- Publisher: Harmony Books
- Publication date: 1999
- Publication place: United States
- Media type: Print (Paperback)
- Pages: 202 pp
- ISBN: 0-609-60490-2
- OCLC: 45617313
- Preceded by: Ishmael, The Story of B, My Ishmael

Beyond Civilization (subtitled Humanity's Next Great Adventure) is a book by Daniel Quinn written as a non-fiction follow-up to his acclaimed Ishmael trilogy—Ishmael, The Story of B, and My Ishmael—as well as to his autobiography, Providence: The Story of a Fifty-Year Vision Quest. Beyond Civilization is written both to illuminate further the arguments and ideas made in his previous books and as a sort of guide to offer possible solutions to the problems he sees with the current state of civilization.

Beyond Civilization is Quinn's foremost text on new tribalism. The book contains one-page explorations into a variety of topics, in the form of reflections, parables, autobiographical accounts, essay-style writings, and deliberate clarifications of ideas introduced in his previous books.

== Synopsis ==
Within the main body of Beyond Civilization, each page contains its own chapter-like heading and a few paragraphs exploring the topic of that heading. The book as whole is divided into seven parts:

=== Part 1: Closing In on the Problem ===
Quinn states his reasons for writing the book and focuses on clarifying his idea in The Story of B that "If the world is saved, it will not be by old minds with new programs but by new minds with no programs at all". He articulates how successful situations often have no visible indicators and that this is true in the community of life whose successes, in general, through natural selection are easy to overlook. He expands upon the nature of his idea of a cultural "vision", including how such a vision can go wrong and how a successful vision results in an easily overlooked lack of symptoms such as social problems. He also introduces Richard Dawkins's concept of the meme, which he merges into the discourse of his own philosophy.

=== Part 2: Closing In on the Process ===
Quinn discusses the memes that are regarded as infallible within the own world-dominating culture. These range from "Growing all your own food is the best way to live" to "Civilization must continue at ANY cost and must not be abandoned under ANY circumstance". He explores the history of tribal societies who developed civilization by beginning to take up full-time agriculture (for example, the Maya and the Olmec), but who unlike modern society realized the failures of civilization and abandoned it in favor of a return to tribalism. Quinn finds it peculiar that the working masses in modern culture have often historically been moved to rebellion against their hierarchal oppressors but never moved to simply walking away from the system of hierarchy itself, which will lead time after time to the majority's displeasure. He also makes use of an analogy of "pyramid-building" to represent the idea of modern culture's people perpetuating a system which repeatedly fails them because they see no alternative: they think they must continue to "build pyramids" even when they overthrow the despots who originated such an idea. He claims that they also see themselves as having no choice in the matter, as if "pyramid-building" is somehow inherently a part of human nature.

=== Part 3: Walking Away from the Pyramid ===
Quinn clarifies that he does not mean to say tribalism is perfect, but it is a more workable system than civilization and is in accord with natural selection. He claims also that tribes are not inherently a matter of "spears and caves" but that some circuses or traveling shows still function as tribes, even today. He also chronicles the passage of a society from one practicing tribalism to one practicing hierarchalism. He states that modern culture uses three reasons to justify its resolve in not abandoning civilization: the just-world fallacy, the possibility for transcendence, and the capacity for revolution (which, he argues, merely shuffles the hierarchy around but does not eliminate it altogether).

=== Part 4: Toward the New Tribalism ===
Quinn states that abandonment is a more workable technique to be rid of hierarchy when compared with violent upheaval; this is because, unlike with upheaval, the people in power have no way to defend themselves against abandonment. He also claims that people do not (and cannot) transform a culture toward tribalism in one single event and, therefore, do not need to wait for conditions to improve before starting to act more tribally (for example, by first ending sexism or racism before moving on to tribal endeavors). Quinn proposes an "incremental revolution" in which groups of people begin to form tribes little by little. These tribes, he speculates, would not be based on shared ethnicity like their historical precedents, but rather, on shared occupational interests. In addition, he proposes that no move beyond civilization could cause greater harm to the environment than modern society already does, which he thus terms the "culture of maximum harm", since it incites each and all of its members to attain the highest, most world-destructive point of affluence.

=== Part 5: The Tribe of Crow ===
Quinn goes into detail about homelessness. He comments on modern culture's paradox of aiming to both aid the survival of the homeless, by trying to temporarily house and feed them, but also to thwart their survival, by outlawing and demonizing many of their typical survival-based activities. The homeless perform many of these activities merely in order to continue surviving while remaining outside a system that is clearly failing them: creating makeshift shelters in parks, dumpster diving for food, etc. Quinn proposes that city officials should help the homeless by listening to their wants rather than trying to end homelessness altogether by ignoring and hindering their survival tactics in a foolish effort to somehow frustrate them back into the work-force. He also provides a few quotations from homeless people who explain their pleasant sense of cohesion and of departure from restrictive social obligations in their current condition.

=== Part 6: The New Tribal Revolution ===
Quinn reminisces on his own tribe-like experience creating a local newspaper with three others, the East Mountain News. He expands upon the patterns and arrangements of successful tribes and gives further examples of what he considers tribe-like organizations. He also makes a distinction between communes and tribes. According to Quinn, a tribe primarily brings together individuals working or "making a living" together democratically; a commune primarily brings together individuals living together but often with a shared set of ideals and with each individual practicing their own different way of making a living (i.e. working).

=== Part 7: Beyond Civilization ===
Quinn refers to many events that show distress among the modern-day youth, including school shootings and rises in teen suicides. He believes this points to signs that young people feel they have no place in a deranging society and that modern culture provides no strong sense of belonging or of hope toward improvement. Essentially, Quinn argues, modern culture must provide an alternate story to the self-destructive one it is currently playing out. He says that this alternate story is also to him the most beautiful one ever told: "There is no one right way for people to live". He addresses two common accusations about this motto: (1) that he is claiming that there is a right way to live—the tribal way—and (2) that having no one right way to live is still itself an expression of a particular way to live that he believes to be right. He dispels these criticisms by stating: (1) that he prefers the tribal way (and hopes to see the development of a New Tribal way) but has never claimed this to be the one right way, and (2) that knowing there is no one right way to live is not at all a way to live. He admits to not having all the answers and encourages his reader to admit likewise when in similar circumstances. He further encourages the reader to let others formulate their own questions, to demand to understand others' questions before answering them, and to look for people who are already open to something new rather than wasting time on those who would argue and are closed-minded. He concludes that the ending of the book is also the beginning of the revolution.

== New Tribal Revolution ==
Daniel Quinn coined the term "new tribalism", which appears in Providence, My Ishmael, and, finally, in the most detail, in Beyond Civilization. He often discusses the proliferation of this new tribalism in terms of a New Tribal Revolution, analogous to the Industrial Revolution in that it refers to a gradual, sociocultural period of change and creative outpouring as opposed to a single, violent, political uprising.

Quinn asserts that new tribalists believe that the tribal model, though not absolutely "perfect", has obviously stood the test of time as the most successful social organization for humans, in alignment with natural selection (just as well as the hive model for bees, the pod model for whales, and the pack model for wolves). According to new tribalists, the tribe fulfills both an emotionally and organizationally stabilizing role in human life, and the dissolution of tribalism with the spread of globalized civilization has come to threaten the very survival of the human species. New tribalists do not necessarily seek to mimic indigenous peoples, but merely to admit the success of indigenous living, and to use some of the basic underlying tenets of that lifestyle for organizing modern tribes, with fundamental principles gleaned from ethnology and anthropological fieldwork.

Quinn argues that modern civilization is not working and will ultimately self-destruct, as evidenced by escalating worldwide trends such as environmental collapse, social unrest caused by hierarchal social structures, disparity between the rich and poor, development of ever-greater weapons of mass destruction, unsustainable human population growth, unsustainable agricultural practices, and unsustainable resource exploitation of all kinds. He claims that if humans are to find a way of life that does work, they should draw basic principles from societies that are working or have worked in the past. Quinn points to indigenous peoples and tribal societies as such examples, and advocates a social revolution—the New Tribal Revolution—to reform society using principles taken from the operation of such cultures. He argues that organizing tribally can start well before any kind of total immersion "back into the wild" and that a new tribal community does not have to look like the old tribal stereotype of "cavemen," since returning immediately to foraging in the natural community is not a viable or even possible solution for the billions of people on Earth today. He consistently phrases the revolution not as a movement to "go back" to some earlier style of living (though he certainly credits the achievements of particular earlier styles of living), but rather, a movement to "go forward" into something new.

An important expression of this movement is the trend towards modern eco-villages. Ecoregional Democracy and peace movement advocates are also often new tribalists as well, as the groups share common ideals.

In an open letter to the Occupy protesters, Quinn described the Occupy movement as the "New Tribal Revolution".
