= List of fictional primates =

.

This list of fictional primates is a subsidiary to the list of fictional animals. The list is restricted to notable non-human primate characters from the world of fiction including chimpanzees, gorillas, orangutans, monkeys, lemurs, and other primates.

== Literature ==
Character	Species	Origin and Author	Notes
Claw the Giant Ape	Ape	Beast Quest	Claw is the second beast Tom fights in Series Two, The Golden Armor. He guards the chain mail. He has a tail with a sting rather like a scorpion. He lives in the Dark Jungle in Avantia.
Francine Frensky	Monkey	Arthur's Valentine by Marc Brown	A tomboy who loves sports, drumming, and singing. She is 8 years old, and she is the best player on her team in just about every sport they play, rivaled only by the Brain at soccer and basketball.
Ishmael	Gorilla	Ishmael by Daniel Quinn	A philosopher who was captured from the wild when young and sent to the zoo. After the zoo sold him to a menagerie, an old Jewish man bought him and could communicate with him through his mind. Ishmael teaches captivity to the unnamed narrator.
The Librarian	Orangutan	Discworld by Terry Pratchett	The Librarian appeared in the first novel of the series, The Colour of Magic, and was transformed into an orang-utan in The Light Fantastic as the Octavo fired a beam of magic upwards. On discovering that being an orang-utan had certain advantages for a librarian - he can climb up to high shelves, for example - he refused to be transformed back into a human and has remained an orang-utan ever since. The other wizards have gradually become used to the situation, to the extent that, from Night Watch: 'if someone ever reported that there was an orang-utan in the Library, the wizards would probably go and ask the Librarian if he'd seen it'.

== Comics ==
Ape	Origin	Notes
Ape-X	Squadron Supreme #5	A member of The Squadron Supreme; Also the name of a super hero who becomes a powerful gorilla after donning a magic Mexican wrestling mask
Gorilla Grodd	the Flash	DC Comics villain, enemy of the Flash
Monsieur Mallah	Doom Patrol (vol. 1) #86	An intelligent gorilla created by an evil brain in a jar. He was a member of the Brotherhood of Evil, enemies of the original Doom Patrol.
Titano	Superman	A fictional character appearing in DC Comics, primarily as a foe of Superman.

== Primates in film ==
Ape	Origin	Notes
Aldo	Planet of the Apes	The leader of the gorilla factions (and the ape revolution, by extension) during the rise of the ape society prior to humanity's downfall, as the "lowest species" of the planet.
King Kong	King Kong	A giant movie monster resembling a colossal gorilla, which has appeared in several films since 1933. These include the groundbreaking 1933 movie, the film remakes of 1976 and 2005, Kong:Skull Island in 2017, as well as various sequels of the first two films. The character has become one of the world's most famous movie icons.
Caesar	Planet of the Apes	Intelligent ape, who is abandoned and rallies a group of apes to escape from a cruel caging facility.
Mighty Joe Young	Mighty Joe Young	An abnormally large gorilla who grew up in Africa who was brought to the US by his owner/friend Jill after being convinced she and the ape could be a popular night club act. After an incident with three drunken patrons his human friend helped to return him to his homeland in Africa.

== Animation ==
Name	Species	Origin	Notes
Lazlo	Spider monkey	Camp Lazlo	
Magilla Gorilla	Gorilla	The Magilla Gorilla Show	
Grape Ape	Gorilla	The Great Grape Ape Show	
Jake Spidermonkey	Spider monkey	My Gym Partner's a Monkey	
Rafiki	Mandrill	The Lion King	
King Gorilla	Gorilla	The Venture Bros.	
Zeke Yeager	Beast Titan	Attack on Titan	

== Television ==
Name	Species	Origin	Notes
Bingo	Orangutan	The Banana Splits	Member of The Banana Splits, an all-animal band. He played the drums.
Professor Bobo	Gorilla	Mystery Science Theater 3000	
Zoboomafoo	Coquerel's sifaka	Zoboomafoo	Titular puppet lemur

== Video games ==
This section deals with notable primates who are prominently featured in various video game titles, either as main characters or notable supporting characters.

Character	Species	Origin	Platform(s)	Notes
Agent 9	Monkey	Spyro: Year of the Dragon	PlayStation	A space monkey introduced as a brief playable character.
AiAi	Monkey	Super Monkey Ball	GameCube	Encased in transparent ball.
Amigo	Monkey	Samba de Amigo	Arcade • Dreamcast • Wii	The player character in this Samba based rhythm game.
Andross		Star Fox	SNES	The archenemy of the Star Fox team.
Andrew Oikonny		Star Fox 64	Nintendo 64	The nephew of Andross, and a member of Star Wolf, the rivals of the Star Fox team.
Bonkers	Gorilla	Kirby		A gorilla who first appeared in Kirby's Adventure. As a mini boss, He fights Kirby with his hammer.
Conga the Gorilla	Gorilla	Banjo-Kazooie	N64	A giant gorilla who first appears in Mumbo's Mountain.
Diddy Kong	Spider monkey	Donkey Kong Country	SNES · GBC · GBA · Wii · N64	Donkey Kong's sidekick.
Dixie Kong	Chimpanzee	Donkey Kong Country 2: Diddy's Kong Quest	SNES · GBA · Wii	Diddy Kong's girlfriend.
Donkey Kong	Gorilla	Donkey Kong	GBA · SNES · 3DS · Nintendo Switch · Wii · WiiU · GameCube · N64 ·	The main character of Donkey Kong Country, and one of Mario's friends. Not to be confused with his grandfather, Cranky Kong.
Donkey Kong Jr.	Gorilla	Donkey Kong Jr.	Arcade · Atari 2600 · Atari 7800 · Atari 8-bit · ColecoVision · GBA · Intellivision · NES · 3DS · Wii	Cranky Kong's son and Donkey Kong's father.
Dr. M	Mandrill	Sly 3: Honor Among Thieves	PlayStation 2	A mad doctor who was eager to open the vault where the fortune of the Cooper family was stored.
Gorilla	Gorilla	Gekido	PlayStation · Game Boy Color	An unlockable character
Gorimondo	Gorilla	Kirby and the Forgotten Land	Nintendo Switch	A gorilla who is a member of the Beast Pack.
Funky Kong	Gorilla	Donkey Kong Country	SNES	An ally and close friend of the Kong family in the Donkey Kong series.
Karasu	Monkey	Fortnite	Various	
Mico	Monkey	Brawl Stars	Mobile	An “actor” who brags about his job at "Brawlywood" (an in-game equivalent of Hollywood) when he is just the mic operator.
Monkey King	Monkey	Dota 2	PC	A playable character inspired by Sun Wukong, the main character in the Chinese epic Journey to the West.
Mookie	Monkey	Kirby and the Forgotten Land	Nintendo Switch	A monkey who is a member of the beast pack.
Porter	Monkey	Animal Crossing	Nintendo 64 · GameCube · Nintendo 3DS	Runs the train station in most Animal Crossing games.
Specter	Monkey	Ape Escape	PlayStation · PlayStation Portable	Rules over lesser apes known as Piposaru.
Toki	Geeshergam	Toki	Arcade	A human that is transformed into an enchanted ape who must battle hordes of enemies to save a princess.
Ukiki	Monkey	Super Mario 64	Nintendo 64 · Wii · Wii U	A small monkey that steals Mario's cap.
Void Kong	Marmoset	Donkey Kong Bananza	Nintendo Switch 2	President of the Void Company.
Winston	Gorilla	Overwatch	PC · PlayStation 4 · Xbox One	A gorilla with superior intelligence.
Wukong	Monkey	League of Legends	PC	A playable champion inspired by Sun Wukong, the main character in the Chinese epic Journey to the West.
Quincy	Monkey	BTD6	PlayStation 4, Xbox One, PC	Quincy son of Quincy.

== Other ==
- Fatz Geronimo, a keyboard-playing gorilla for The Rock-afire Explosion at ShowBiz Pizza Place.
- Suzanne (2002), a 500-polygon test model of a chimpanzee's head, modeled by Willem-Paul van Overbruggen for Blender (ver. 2.25).

== See also ==
- List of individual apes
- List of individual monkeys
