= Mother culture =

A mother culture is a term for an earlier people's culture that has a great and widespread influence on some later cultures and people. Though the original culture may fade, the mother culture's influence grows for ages in the future. Later civilizations either learn and build upon their old ways or can learn them through peaceful or military assimilation. Although the term is used by anthropologists and archaeologists, it is used sparingly since it oversimplifies and in some cases even misrepresents the relationships between cultures.

The most frequently cited examples of mother cultures are Ancient Egypt in the Mediterranean, and the Olmec in Mesoamerica.

== Daniel Quinn ==
In the work of Daniel Quinn—first mentioned in his 1992 philosophical novel, Ishmael—Mother Culture is used as a collective term for any given culture's most influencing features (its philosophies, attitudes, values, viewpoints, etc.) that, however, are usually not consciously recognized as being culturally-specific by the members of that culture. In other words, Mother Culture is the set of "unquestioned influences" or "hidden premises" that the members of a culture merely take for granted as being universally true (rather than, in fact, being culturally-specific), and that largely determine (1) how the members of that culture experience and view the world, and, therefore, (2) how they actually behave in the world. Because every person is culturally biased to a greater or lesser extent, Quinn reasons that every culture must have a certain crucial element that instills in its members this firm position of bias: this is Mother Culture. Quinn often uses the term Mother Culture as a feminine personification.

According to Quinn, every Mother Culture feeds its followers a particular, culturally-skewed mythology that greatly influences how these people perceive themselves and their environment. Mother Culture works to uphold (and to pacify any dissent against) the culture and its specific worldview. Quinn claims that "every culture has a Mother Culture" but warns that in a self-destructive culture like our own globalized civilization, Mother Culture's promotion of the status quo amounts to captivity, in which we are unable to fathom any alternative lifestyles other than the one Mother Culture tells us to live out (because we cannot think beyond the hidden premises our culture lives by—the cultural "truths" that Mother Culture insists are unquestionable). Unfortunately, because we, as a culture, are destroying the Earth, while many of us would wish to stop this destruction, Quinn asserts that we cannot seem to find the "bars" of our proverbial cage because Mother Culture has given us certain assumptions that we assume without question, never recognizing them as false from the start. Quinn has frequently claimed that two of the most fundamental (but false) premises communicated to us by our Mother Culture, in particular, include the following: "There is only one right way to live: ours" and "We must cling to civilization at all costs, even if it kills us." Quinn further describes such premises in his discussion on memes in Beyond Civilization.
