= Ishmael (Quinn novel) =

1992 philosophical novel by Daniel Quinn

- First edition
- Author: Daniel Quinn
- Language: English
- Genre: Philosophical novel, secret history, magic realism
- Publisher: Bantam/Turner Books
- Publication date: 1992
- Publication place: United States
- Media type: Print (hardback)
- Pages: 266 p.
- ISBN: 0-553-07875-5
- OCLC: 24068428
- Followed by: The Story of B

Ishmael is a 1992 philosophical novel by Daniel Quinn. The novel examines the hidden cultural biases driving modern civilization and explores themes of ethics, sustainability, and global catastrophe. Largely framed as a Socratic conversation between two characters, Ishmael aims to expose that several widely accepted assumptions of modern society, such as human supremacy, are actually cultural myths that produce catastrophic consequences for humankind and the environment. The novel was awarded the $500,000 Turner Tomorrow Fellowship Award in 1991, a year before its formal publication.

Ishmael is part of a loose trilogy that includes The Story of B (a 1996 spiritual sequel), and My Ishmael (a 1997 "sidequel.") Quinn also details how he arrived at the ideas behind Ishmael in his 1994 autobiography, Providence: The Story of a Fifty-Year Vision Quest. Yet another related book is Quinn's 1999 short treatise, Beyond Civilization.

== Plot summary ==
Implicitly set in the early 1990s, Ishmael begins with a newspaper advertisement: "Teacher seeks pupil. Must have an earnest desire to save the world. Apply in person". The nameless narrator and protagonist thus begins his story, telling how he first reacted to this ad with scorn because of the absurdity of "wanting to save the world", a notion he feels that he once naïvely embraced himself as an adolescent during the counterculture movement of the 1960s. Feeling he must discover the ad's publisher, he follows its address, surprisingly finding himself in a room with a live gorilla. On the wall is a sign with a double meaning: "With man gone, will there be hope for gorilla?" Suddenly, the gorilla, calling himself Ishmael, begins communicating to the man telepathically. At first baffled by this, the man learns the story of how the gorilla came to be here and soon accepts Ishmael as his teacher, regularly returning to Ishmael's office. The novel continues from this point mainly as a dialogue between Ishmael and his new student.

Ishmael's life began in the African wilderness, though he was captured at a young age and has lived mostly in a zoo and a menagerie (before living permanently in a private residence), which caused Ishmael to start thinking about ideas that he never would have thought about in the wild, including self-awareness, human language and culture, and what he refers to as the subject he specifically teaches: "captivity". The narrator admits to Ishmael that he has a vague notion of living in some sort of cultural captivity and being lied to in some way by society, but he cannot articulate these feelings fully.

The man frequently visits Ishmael over the next several weeks, and Ishmael proceeds to use the Socratic method to deduce with the man what "origin story" and other "myths" modern civilization subscribes to. Before proceeding, Ishmael lays down some basic definitions for his student:

- A story is an interrelation between the gods, humans, and the earth—with a beginning, middle, and end.
- To enact is to behave in such a way to make a story (however true or not) come true.
- A culture is a people who are enacting a story.
- Takers are "civilized" people, particularly, members of the culture that first emerged in an Agricultural Revolution starting 10,000 years ago in the Near East that has developed into today's globalized society (the culture of Ishmael's pupil and, presumably, the reader).
- Leavers are people of all other non-civilized cultures existing in the past and the present; often derogatorily referred to by Takers as "primitive".

At first, the narrator is certain that civilized people no longer believe in any "myths", but Ishmael proceeds to gradually tease from him several hidden but widely accepted premises of "mythical" thinking being enacted by the Takers:

- Humans (especially Takers) are the pinnacle of evolution.
- The world was made for humans, and humans are thus destined to conquer and rule the world.
- This conquest is meant to bring about a paradise, as humans increase their mastery over controlling nature.
- However, humans are always failing in this conquest because they are flawed beings, who are unable to ever obtain the knowledge of how to live best.
- Therefore, however hard humans labor to save the world, they are just going to go on defiling and destroying it.
- Even so, civilization—the great human project of trying to control the whole world—must continue, or else humans will go extinct.

Ishmael points out to his student that when the Takers decided all of this, especially the idea that there is something fundamentally wrong with humans, they took as evidence only their own particular culture's history: "They were looking at a half of one percent of the evidence taken from a single culture. Not a reasonable sample on which to base such a sweeping conclusion". On the contrary, Ishmael asserts that there is nothing inherently wrong with humans and that a story that places humans in harmony with the world will cause humans to enact this harmony, while a destructive story such as this will cause humans to destroy the world, as humans are doing now. Ishmael goes on to help his student discover that, contrary to this Taker world-view, there is indeed knowledge of how humans should live: biological "laws" that life is subject to, discernible by studying the ecological patterns of other living things. Together, Ishmael and his student identify one set of survival strategies that appear to be true for all species (later dubbed the "law of limited competition"): in short, as a species, "you may compete to the full extent of your capabilities, but you may not hunt down competitors or destroy their food or deny them access to food. In other words, you may compete but you may not wage war". All species inevitably follow this law, or as a consequence go extinct; the Takers, however, believe themselves to be exempt from this law and flout it at every point, which is therefore rapidly leading humanity towards extinction.

To illustrate his philosophy, Ishmael proposes a revision to the Christian myth of the Fall of Man. Ishmael's version of why the fruit was forbidden to Adam and Eve in the Garden of Eden is: eating the fruit of the Tree of the Knowledge of Good and Evil provides gods with the knowledge of who shall live and who shall die—knowledge which they need to rule the world. The fruit nourishes only the gods, though. If Adam ("humanity") were to eat from this tree, he might think that he gained the gods' wisdom (without this actually happening) and consequently destroy the world and himself through his arrogance. Ishmael makes the point that the myth of the Fall, which the Takers have adopted as their own, was in fact developed by Leavers to explain the origin of the Takers. If it were of Taker origin, the story would be of liberating progress instead of a sinful fall.

Ishmael and his student go on to discuss how, for the ancient herders among whom the tale originated, the Biblical story of Cain killing Abel symbolizes the Leaver being killed off and their lands taken so that it could be put under cultivation. These ancient herders realized that the Takers were acting as if they were gods themselves, with all the wisdom of what is good and evil and how to rule the world: agriculture is, in fact, an attempt to more greatly create and control life, a power that only gods can hold, not humans. To begin discerning the Leavers' story, Ishmael proposes to his student a hypothesis: the Takers' Agricultural Revolution was a revolution in trying to strenuously and destructively live above the laws of nature, against the Leavers' more ecologically peaceful story of living by the laws of nature.

The Takers, by practicing their uniquely envisioned form of agriculture (dubbed by Quinn "totalitarian agriculture" in a later book) produce enormous food surpluses, which consequently yields an ever-increasing population, which itself is leading to ecological imbalances and catastrophes around the world. Ishmael finishes his education with the student by saying that, in order for humanity to survive, Takers must relinquish their arrogant vision in favor of the Leaver humility in knowing that they do not possess any god-like knowledge of some "one right way to live". They can adopt an alternative story that has humans as the first, not the final, fully-conscious creature. We can support evolution and diversity. Ishmael tells his student to teach a hundred people what he has learned, who can each pass this learning on to another hundred.

The student becomes busy at work, later discovering that Ishmael has fallen ill and died of pneumonia. Returning to Ishmael's room one day, he collects Ishmael's belongings. Among them he discovers that the sign he saw before ("With man gone, will there be hope for gorilla?") has a backside with another message: "With gorilla gone, will there be hope for man?"

== Reinterpretation of biblical stories ==
Ishmael proposes that the story of Genesis was written by the Semites and later adapted to work within Hebrew, Christian and Muslim belief structures. He proposes that Abel's extinction metaphorically represents the nomadic Semites' losing in their conflict with agriculturalists. As they were driven further into the Arabian peninsula, the Semites became isolated from other herding cultures and, according to Ishmael, illustrated their plight through oral history, which was later adopted into the Hebrew book of Genesis.

Ishmael denies that the Tree of Knowledge of Good and Evil was forbidden to humans simply to test humans' self-control. Instead, he proposes that eating of the Tree would not actually give humans divine knowledge but would only make humans believe they had been given it, and that the Tree represents the choice to bear the responsibility of deciding which species live and which die. This is a decision agricultural peoples (i.e. Takers) make when deciding which organisms to cultivate, which to displace, and which to kill in protection of the first.

Ishmael explains that the Fall of Adam represents the belief that, once mankind usurps this responsibility—historically decided through natural ecology (i.e. food chains)—that humankind will perish. He cites as fulfillment of this prophecy contemporary environmental crises such as endangered or extinct species, global warming, and modern mental illnesses.

== Characters ==
=== Main characters ===
- Ishmael is a gorilla, born in the 1930s, when he was captured from the West African wild and sent to an American zoo. After the zoo sold him to a menagerie, Walter Sokolow bought him and discovered that they could communicate telepathically. A few years after Sokolow died in 1985, Ishmael sets up an office and newspaper advertisements in search of pupils, with the help of Sokolow's daughter, in order to begin teaching the subject of "captivity". The narrator and Ishmael meet in 1991.
- The narrator and protagonist is a middle-aged white American man who sought a teacher to show him how to save the world when he was younger, during the turbulent and idealistic 1960s. Now an adult, he finds Ishmael's ad looking for a pupil who wants to save the world. Intrigued because his childhood question may be answered, but skeptical because he has never found answers in the past, he goes and discovers this new teacher: Ishmael. The narrator never reveals his name in the novel, though it is revealed in the sequel My Ishmael to be Alan Lomax.

=== Unseen characters ===
- Walter Sokolow is a wealthy European Jewish merchant who is mentioned only in Ishmael's back story but has died by the time of the main story. His family was killed in the Holocaust, during which Sokolow fled to the United States. While visiting a menagerie during World War Two, he came across a gorilla called Goliath (Ishmael's given alias at the menagerie). After figuring out that he and Ishmael could mentally speak to each other, Sokolow renamed the gorilla "Ishmael" and bought him from the zoo. The two studied a vast array of subjects together and, after his death in 1985, Sokolow's adult daughter Rachel funds Ishmael's upkeep, though she herself dies from AIDS in 1991.

== References in popular culture ==
The opening credits for the 1999 film Instinct, starring Anthony Hopkins and Cuba Gooding Jr., indicate that it is inspired by Ishmael. Daniel Quinn did not approve of the script or movie before transferring the rights, which were transferred as part of the Turner Award, though he may have had some minor input on the script, though to a degree he personally considered trivial. The movie and book share no common story elements, and the philosophical connection to the book is reduced to some pictorial format and a few seconds of on-screen dialogue.

Eddie Vedder of Pearl Jam has cited the book as an influence on their album, Yield. Quinn responds to the album's significance in relation to the book on his website.

In Rise Against's album The Sufferer and The Witness, Ishmael is on the album notes' recommended reading list.

The song "The Taker Story" on Chicano Batman's 2017 album Freedom is Free describes the global colonization of the "Taker" societies based on the use of the term in Ishmael.

The name of progressive metal band Animals as Leaders was inspired by the book.

== Chronology of events in the Ishmael trilogy ==
The following is a list of the (fictional) events in the interrelated time frame of Ishmael (published in 1992), The Story of B (1996), and My Ishmael (1997). Much of the chronology remains ambiguous in the former two, though is specified in much more detail in My Ishmael.

- 1930s: Ishmael is born in "equatorial West Africa", captured, and sent to live in a U.S. "zoo in some small northeastern city" for "several years"
- Late 1930s: Ishmael lives in a traveling menagerie for "three or four years"
- 1939 or 1940: Ishmael is sold to Walter Sokolow, a wealthy European Jewish émigré and merchant in the U.S.
- 1955: Art "Artie" Owens is born Makiadi "Adi" Owona in the Belgian Congo (renamed Zaire in 1971)
- c. 1950s: Charles Atterley is born in the U.S
- 1960s: Walter Sokolow marries Grace, who bears a single child, Rachel
- 25 February 1979: Julie Gerchak is born in the U.S.
- Early 1980s: Art Owens studies in Belgium, becomes a dual citizen of Zaire and Belgium, travels to the U.S., and attends Cornell University, where he meets Rachel Sokolow, who is completing her master's degree in biology
- c. 1980s: Charles Atterley becomes Ishmael's pupil
- 1985: Walter Sokolow dies and Ishmael begins living in a variety of new locations
- 1987: Art Owens returns to Zaire, leaving his U.S. investments with Rachel Sokolow
- 1989: Ishmael sets up his office in Room 105 of the Fairfield Building, located in a "little [American] city"
- 2 March 1989: Art Owens participates in the new Republic of Mabili's secession from Zaire; he becomes Mabili's minister of the interior
- November to December 1989: Art Owens flees Mabili and returns to the U.S., beginning work with the Darryl Hicks Carnival and eventually buying off the Carnival's animal menagerie
- 1990: Art Owens becomes acquainted with Ishmael through Rachel Sokolow
- c. 1991: Charles Atterley begins lecturing in Europe
- January 1991: Rachel Sokolow tests positive for HIV and dies that same year
- 1991–2: Events of Ishmael and most of My Ishmael:
  - 1991: Alan Lomax (the previously unnamed narrator of Ishmael) and then Julie Gerchak become Ishmael's pupils
  - 29 October to 2 November 1991: Julie Gerchak, with the secret help of Art Owens, visits the Republic of Mabili and successfully persuades its president, Mokonzi Nkemi, to authorize Ishmael's entry into his country and subsequent release back into the African jungle
  - Late 1991–1992: Ishmael begins living in the Darryl Hicks Carnival menagerie and becomes ill with pneumonia
  - 1992: Alan Lomax believes Ishmael to have died from pneumonia and ultimately publishes Ishmael
  - March 1992: Ishmael recuperates and by this date has returned to Africa
  - Summer 1995: Julie Gerchak begins writing My Ishmael
- 10 May to 8 June 1996: Events of The Story of B:
  - 19 or 20 May: Jared Osborne becomes Charles Atterley's pupil
  - 22 May: Charles Atterley is assassinated while aboard a train in Germany
  - 26 May: Jared Osborne and close associates of Charles Atterley survive the bombing of Schauspielhaus Wahnfried, a theater in Radenau, Germany
- 28 November 1996: Julie Gerchak completes all but the final chapter of My Ishmael
- 1997: Julie Gerchak adds a final chapter, "The Waiting Ends", to My Ishmael and finally publishes the book with permission from Art Owens

== See also ==
- Anarcho-primitivism
- Cultural diversity
- Deep ecology
- Ecosophy
- Evolution of societies
- Green anarchism
- Intentional community
- Jared Diamond
- Law of rent
- The Limits to Growth
- List of fictional primates
- Mother culture
- Permaculture
