= Turner Tomorrow Fellowship Award =

American literary prize

- Awarded for: Fiction proposing creative solutions to global crises
- Sponsored by: Ted Turner
- Location: United States
- Reward: US$500,000
- First award: 1989
- Final award: 1991
- Only winner: Daniel Quinn for Ishmael
- Website: N/A

The Turner Tomorrow Fellowship Award (stylized as Turner Tomorrow Fellowship) was a literary prize launched in 1989 by American media magnate and environmental philanthropist Ted Turner. Conceived to spur fiction addressing pressing global crises—particularly ecological sustainability—it offered a groundbreaking 500,000 grand prize (250,000 cash plus $250,000 promotional funding) for unpublished novels proposing "creative solutions to humanity's urgent problems". The prize sought to harness fiction as a tool for engaging public dialogue on global challenges, reflecting Turner’s commitment to philanthropy exemplified by his founding of the United Nations Foundation.

The prize was awarded once, in 1991, to Daniel Quinn’s philosophical novel Ishmael, selected from 2,500 submissions by a jury including Nobel laureate Nadine Gordimer, authors Ray Bradbury, Wallace Stegner, Peter Matthiessen, and William Styron. gorilla to challenge humanity’s self-centred view of nature, emerged as a foundational text in environmental writing — even as academics criticized its tendency to oversimplify historical contexts. Three additional "Patronage Awards" ($50,000 each) recognized runners-up Sarah Cameron, Janet Keller, and Andy Goldblatt.

Plagued by controversies—including juror disputes over the prize's financial scale and the perceived mismatch between Quinn’s work and the award’s utopia mandate—the fellowship was discontinued after its inaugural cycle. Though its collaboration with the United Nations to distribute winning works as educational materials never materialized, the award is noted as a precursor to contemporary climate-focused literary initiatives. Ishmael’s enduring academic influence, adopted in disciplines from ecology to philosophy, underscores the prize’s legacy in bridging speculative fiction with environmental activism.

== Founder and purpose ==
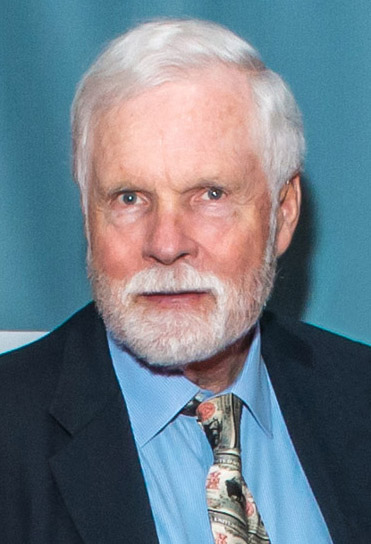
Ted Turner

=== Ted Turner's background ===
The Turner Tomorrow Fellowship Award was established in 1989 by American media entrepreneur and philanthropist Ted Turner, founder of CNN. The award aimed to encourage unpublished works of fiction that proposed creative and positive solutions to global environmental and social problems. As reported by Time magazine, Turner launched the initiative to inspire authors worldwide to “write about creative and positive solutions to global problems within an original work of fiction” . He believed that literature had the power to engage the public in urgent environmental discourse. Turner further emphasized, “The great minds of today need to focus on the problems of global significance if humanity is to see new tomorrows”

In addition to founding this unique literary prize—at the time the largest single cash award ever offered for a single work of fiction—Turner incorporated a publishing contract and a film option to further expand the cultural reach of the winning work. His involvement in global and environmental issues extended beyond literature. He founded the United Nations Foundation in 1997, contributing one billion dollars to support global health, climate change action, and the Sustainable Development Goals. He also chairs the Turner Foundation, which supports environmental conservation and population stabilization projects throughout the United States.

=== Purpose of the award ===
The Turner Tomorrow Fellowship Award sought to recognize fiction that offered imaginative and constructive responses to global crises. The prize specifically honored unpublished full-length novels that addressed urgent issues such as environmental degradation, climate change, and ethical challenges facing humanity. Turner viewed fiction as a more emotionally resonant medium than academic writing for communicating complex ideas to the public. This vision aligned with the values of the Earth Charter, which promotes sustainable development and ecological ethics.

Turner believed that while scientific writing and policy discourse could articulate problems, fiction had the power to humanize abstract issues and move readers emotionally. He hoped to inspire a new generation of storytellers who could make global problems relatable through character-driven narratives. This reflected an early understanding of what would later be termed “cli-fi” (climate fiction), a genre now widely used to raise environmental awareness through speculative storytelling.

As reflected in the mission of the Turner Foundation—“to protect and restore the natural systems – air, land, and water – on which all life depends”—the award was part of a broader commitment to using media and storytelling to drive environmental awareness and action.

The Turner Tomorrow Fellowship Award website said: "The Mission of the Turner Foundation Is To Protect and Restore the Natural Systems – Air, Land, and Water – On Which All Life Depends".

=== Features of the prize ===
The Turner Tomorrow Fellowship Award offered a total prize value of $500,000, making it the largest cash award ever granted for a single literary work at the time. The funds were divided into two parts: $250,000 as direct prize money to the winner, and an additional $250,000 allocated for promotion and marketing of the work.

The prize also included a publishing contract and a film option, further expanding the reach of the winning novel. Notably, the award was presented only once, in 1991, and was not repeated due to logistical complications and internal disagreements within the judging panel.

The award was open exclusively to unpublished full-length novels written in English. Submissions had to focus on themes related to a sustainable future, proposing creative responses to the pressing global problems of the time.

=== Criteria and selection process ===
The theme requirement is fictionalized exploration of global crises facing humanity (e.g. ecological, social, ethical issues), with an attempt to propose solutions or critical reflections. Selection is made by an anonymous jury composed of a number of literary heavyweights, including Nobel Prize winner Nadine Gordimer and science fiction writer Ray Bradbury. The judging will focus on the innovation, literary quality and social impact of the works.

Only unpublished full-length novels are accepted, and authors must be writing in English, but there is no restriction on nationality.

== The Winning Work: Ishmael ==
=== 2.1 Overview ===
The 1991 Winner, Daniel Quinn's Ishmael (The Gorilla Dialogues), which explores the relationship between human civilization and nature, has since become a classic of environmental literature. Challenging the foundational assumptions of modern civilization through philosophical allegory, Ishmael's central contribution is to attribute the ecological crisis to cultural narratives. Along with historical reductionism and binary cultural model, the book has sparked widespread discussion in the fields of environmental ethics, ecocriticism, and cultural studies, and is regarded as a popularized classic text of the deep ecology movement.

The 56-year-old novelist won the inaugural $500,000 Turner Tomorrow Fellowship. The award was established in November 1989 by media magnate Ted Turner with the goal of inspiring great writers and thinkers from all over the world for which he got recognized.

Turner developed the award with the purpose of combining literary quality with potential solutions to serious environmental challenges. In an interview, he said, "The great minds of today need to focus on the problems of global significance if humanity is to see new tomorrows" and continued, "These awards are designed to encourage writing by authors throughout the world and in all languages that creates positive solutions to global problems".

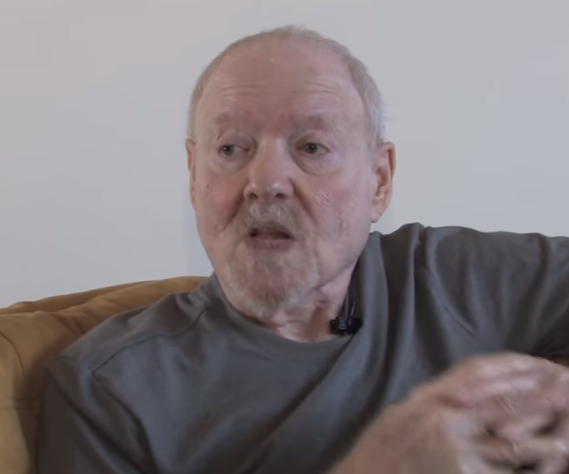
Daniel Quinn

=== The Author: Daniel Quinn ===
Daniel Quinn (1935-2018) was born and grew up in Omaha, Nebraska, where he graduated from Creighton Preparatory School in 1953. He attended St. Louis University, the University of Vienna and Loyola University Chicago, where he received a Bachelor of Arts in English with honors in 1957. In addition to ishmael, he has written the autobiographies Providence (1994), The Story Of B (1996), and My Ishmael: A Sequel (1997).

In 1975, Quinn quit his job as a publisher to pursue a career as a freelance writer. His 1992 book Ishmael, which was awarded the Turner Tomorrow Fellowship Award in 1991, is his most well-known work. Judge Ray Bradbury, for example, supported the ruling despite some judges questioning why Quinn should receive the full $500,000 award for Ishmael rather than splitting the funds among several authors. Ishmael was the first in Quinn's loose trilogy of novels, which also included My Ishmael and The Story of B. Throughout the 1990s, Quinn gained significant notoriety for these works. Although he did not strongly connect with any of these causes, he became a well-known author among anarchists, environmentalists, and proponents of simple life.

Daniel Quinn, who largely wrote fiction, investigated the culturally warped mindset that sustains modern civilization as well as the degradation of the natural environment. He aimed to identify and criticize some of civilization's most persistent "myths," which he believed included the following: that because the Earth was created specifically for humans, humans must conquer and rule it; that humans are inherently flawed and superior to nature (what Quinn referred to as "the most dangerous idea in existence"); and that all people must be forced to live in a single, correct way.

=== Themes and narrative strategy ===
According to Daniel Quinn's website, Ishmael.org, the main idea he wants to convey through his work is that, in order for us to live on Earth, we must listen to the lessons that our fellow members of the interwoven web of life have to offer. The instructor must have been one of the community's inhuman members. He decides to depict Ishmael as a gorilla rather than a parrot, salmon, or butterfly because no other creature wields greater power and authority than a gorilla.

In addition to being a powerful critique of the notion of human superiority, Daniel Quinn's book presents a compelling case for reconsidering our relationship with nature. Through the character of Ishmael, the novel challenges the widely held belief in human superiority and entitlement by emphasizing the interconnectedness of all living creatures. It encourages readers to investigate opposing ideas that prioritize sustainability, harmony, and respect in our interactions with the environment.

By reversing the conventional roles of human teacher and non-human subject, Quinn subverts the traditional hierarchy of knowledge. Ishmael’s role as the wise gorilla not only surprises the reader but also models a narrative inversion that supports the book’s ecological philosophy. The structure of the novel challenges the anthropocentric assumption that wisdom is an exclusively human trait.

Narrative of Quinn perpetuates a sense of accountability and understanding of the chain of life. He urges the audience through his words to reevaluate their thoughts on human supremacy. He encourages equality of all living beings, and that is why he uses Ishmael, the animal to present his narrative in his novel. By doing so, he challenges the common superiority complex and the very idea of human dominance over other species.

By his character of Ishmael, an animal who is intelligent and teaches a human protagonist a lesson, he has shown a flaw in the very idea of human dominance. His narrative urges the readers through Ishmael’s wisdom to reconsider their role in ecology. He offers a more inclusive perspective on this ecological crises and promotes harmony among all species

By adopting a worldview that recognizes all beings' fundamental worth and rights, we may pave the way for a more sustainable future that acknowledges the connectivity and interdependence of all species on the planet.

== Reception and scholarly commentary ==
Daniel Quinn's Ishmael has received mixed responses from scholars across disciplines, ranging from enthusiastic endorsement to critical skepticism. Many commentators have focused on its philosophical message and cultural critique, particularly its challenge to anthropocentrism.

Ecological philosopher John Livingston (1994) praised the novel for exposing what he termed the “absurdity of human exceptionalism,” arguing that the allegorical form successfully conveyed the core principles of deep ecology—a worldview emphasizing the intrinsic value of all living beings.

Sociologist John Zerzan (1994) noted that Quinn’s critique of agricultural civilization aligns closely with the values of anarcho-primitivism, a philosophical perspective advocating for a return to pre-industrial modes of life and questioning technological progress.

By contrast, historian Yuval Noah Harari (2015) argued that Ishmael oversimplifies the complexities of the Agricultural Revolution. He criticized the novel for ignoring the cultural and developmental gains that accompanied early agriculture, focusing solely on its ecological drawbacks.

Anthropologist Shepard Krech III (1999) similarly challenged Quinn’s portrayal of pre-industrial societies as inherently sustainable. He described the notion of the “Leavers”—cultures living in ecological harmony—as overly idealistic, noting that indigenous groups have also, at times, contributed to resource overuse.

Ramachandra Guha (1999) critiqued the novel’s binary model of “Takers vs. Leavers” as ignoring the diversity and nuance of non-Western civilizations. He argued that this dichotomy risks reinforcing romanticized views of the “noble savage” while failing to account for the complexities of traditional societies.

In addition to these scholarly discussions, Ishmael has spurred broader philosophical debates on the moral status of non-human beings. Toby Svoboda compared Quinn’s view to that of Immanuel Kant, who maintained that humans have only indirect duties to animals, grounded in our responsibilities to fellow humans. In contrast, Ishmael challenges this anthropocentric stance by advocating for a worldview that recognizes the intrinsic value and voice of all living things.

The novel’s dialogic structure, particularly in its concluding chapters, reinforces its philosophical aims. Ishmael, the titular gorilla, serves as an unorthodox teacher, guiding the protagonist through a reexamination of cultural myths that promote human dominance. These dialogues culminate in a critique of the narratives that have historically justified the exploitation of Earth’s resources.

Through this approach, Ishmael encourages readers to reconsider their assumptions about civilization, progress, and humanity’s ecological role. While not without criticism, the novel remains a significant touchstone in environmental literature and continues to provoke interdisciplinary reflection on the narratives that shape our relationship with nature.

Since its publication, Ishmael has been incorporated into curricula at various educational levels in the United States, Canada, and Europe. It is taught in courses ranging from environmental studies and philosophy to ethics and literary theory. Educators often use the novel to introduce students to ecological thought, cultural critique, and alternative modes of reasoning about sustainability.

== History and controversies ==
=== Establishment and public reception ===
The Turner Tomorrow Fellowship Award was officially announced by Ted Turner on CNN in 1989. The initiative aimed to encourage authors around the world to write fiction that proposed creative solutions to pressing environmental and social crises. The award quickly garnered widespread interest from the global literary community, positioning itself as a major philanthropic intervention in the realm of fiction writing.

In the early 1990s, the award was initially promoted with the additional promise that the winning manuscript would be submitted to the United Nations as part of a broader effort to integrate literature into global environmental education. However, this proposed collaboration ultimately did not materialize.

=== Judging and winner selection ===
By June 1990, the competition had received over 2,500 entries, reflecting substantial enthusiasm from writers worldwide. The submissions were evaluated by a distinguished panel of judges, including Ray Bradbury, Nadine Gordimer, William Styron, Wallace Stegner, and Peter Matthiessen, among others. According to some accounts, other notable authors such as Kurt Vonnegut were also informally consulted or involved during the judging process.

In May 1991, the panel selected Ishmael by Daniel Quinn as the winning entry. In presenting the award, Turner stated that the novel “redefines the relationship between mankind and nature,” a sentiment that reflected the award’s mission of stimulating new thinking about global sustainability and ethics. In addition to the $500,000 prize, Quinn received a hardcover publishing contract from Turner Broadcasting’s publishing division, as well as additional funding for marketing and potential film development.

=== Internal disagreements and public controversy ===
The award sparked notable controversy, primarily concerning the amount of the prize and the decision-making process behind its distribution. Although the majority of judges agreed that Ishmael was the strongest of the twelve shortlisted manuscripts, several—including William Styron, Peter Matthiessen, and Wallace Stegner—expressed concerns over whether the novel’s literary merits justified the full $500,000 sum.

Critics argued that publisher Michael Reagan, who managed the award’s publication logistics, mishandled dissenting views within the judging panel and failed to transparently address concerns raised by jurors. In contrast, Ray Bradbury defended the decision, stating that half a million dollars was not excessive for a high-impact novel, especially in comparison to the multimillion-dollar advances often awarded to celebrity authors.

As a gesture of resolution, each of the nine judges was awarded $10,000 in compensation. While the award ultimately achieved its goal of elevating environmental themes in literature, the surrounding controversy prompted widespread debate about the fairness, value, and sustainability of high-profile literary prizes.

Despite these internal disputes, Ishmael received the award and went on to attain substantial public and academic recognition. The discussion it generated contributed to a broader reflection on the role of literature in addressing global issues, even as the Turner Tomorrow Fellowship Award was discontinued and never presented again.

== Controversy ==
Some of the judges, including novelists William Styron, Peter Matthiessen and Wallace Stegner, felt while Ishmael was the best of the 12 manuscripts, "we didn't feel it was worth anything remotely like $500,000." They felt that Michael Reagan, of Turner Publishing, had handled their grievances dishonestly. Ray Bradbury disagreed with his fellow judges: "This is a fine piece of work... If Kitty Kelley can make $5-million-to-$6 million, why not half-a-million for a real book?" $10,000 was paid to each of the nine judges.
