= Dreamer (novel) =

1988 novel by Daniel Quinn

- First edition
- Author: Daniel Quinn
- Language: English
- Publisher: Tor Books
- Publication date: December 15, 1988
- Publication place: United States
- Media type: Paperback)
- Pages: 345 pp
- ISBN: 0-812-52475-6
- OCLC: 18917742
- LC Class: CPB Box no. 2479 vol. 15

Dreamer is a novel written by Daniel Quinn in 1988.

== Plot summary ==
Awake, Greg Donner falls in love with the beautiful red-headed Ginny Winters, a woman with a mysterious past. Asleep, Greg dreams of pursuing Ginny through a terrifyingly deserted Chicago. Awake, Richard Iles is confined to a sanatorium in Kentucky and trapped in a turbulent marriage to Ginny Winters. Asleep, Richard dreams he is Greg Donner. And when he next wakes up, he IS Greg Donner. But Ginny has gone. Overall, Quinn regards this work as a love story that depicts certain components of his relationship with his own wife.
