= Instinct (1999 film) =

1999 American film by Jon Turteltaub

- Theatrical release poster
- Directed by: Jon Turteltaub
- Screenplay by: Gerald Di Pego
- Story by: Gerald Di Pego
- Based on: Ishmael by Daniel Quinn
- Produced by: Michael Taylor; Barbara Boyle
- Starring: Anthony Hopkins; Cuba Gooding Jr.; Donald Sutherland; Maura Tierney; George Dzundza; John Ashton
- Cinematography: Philippe Rousselot
- Edited by: Richard Francis-Bruce
- Music by: Danny Elfman
- Production companies: Touchstone Pictures; Spyglass Entertainment
- Distributed by: Buena Vista Pictures Distribution (United States/Canada); Spyglass Entertainment (International)
- Release date: June 4, 1999
- Running time: 124 minutes
- Country: United States
- Language: English
- Budget: $60 million
- Box office: $34.1 million

Instinct is a 1999 American psychological thriller film, directed by Jon Turteltaub, and starring Anthony Hopkins, Cuba Gooding Jr., Donald Sutherland, Maura Tierney, George Dzundza, and John Ashton. It was very-loosely-inspired by Ishmael, a novel by Daniel Quinn. In the United States, the film had the working title Ishmael. In 2000, the film was nominated for and won a Genesis Award in the category of feature film. This was the first film produced by Spyglass Entertainment.

== Plot ==
The film examines the mind of anthropologist Ethan Powell who had been missing for a few years, living in the jungle of Uganda's Bwindi Impenetrable Forest with mountain gorillas. He is convicted of killing and injuring several supposed Wilderness Park Rangers in East Africa, and is sent to prison. A bright young psychiatrist, Theo Caulder, tries to find out why he killed them, but becomes entangled in a quest to learn the true history and nature of humankind, stating that civilization has steadily destroyed the natural world, advocating that humans abandon this. Eventually it is revealed that during the course of Powell's stay with the gorillas, they accepted him as part of their group; he was attempting to protect his great ape family when the poachers arrived and started shooting them. He gets a hearing to reveal the truth, but an attack by a vicious guard on another prisoner causes Powell to be reminded of the killed gorillas, at which point he violently attacks the guard to stop him, is restrained and stops talking again. At the end of the film, Powell escapes from prison using a pen to dig out the lock on a window, and heads back to Africa.

== Cast ==
- Anthony Hopkins as Dr. Ethan Powell
- Cuba Gooding Jr. as Dr. Theo Caulder
- Donald Sutherland as Professor Ben Hillard
- Maura Tierney as Lynn Powell
- George Dzundza as Dr. John Murray
- John Ashton as Dacks
- John Aylward as Warden Keefer
- Ivonne Coll as Dr. Marzuez
- Rex Linn as Alan
- Tracey Ellis as Annie
- Marc Macaulay as Foley
- Verne Troyer as Gorilla
- Tory Kittles as Prisoner

== Production ==
Wolfgang Petersen was initially looking to direct the film but became executive producer with his partner Gail Katz.

Principal photography began on January 25, 1998 and ended on August 7.

Buena Vista Pictures handled North American distribution, while Spyglass Entertainment handled international sales. Buena Vista International handled distribution rights in the United Kingdom, Australia and Latin America.

== Reception ==
The film received mixed reviews. Review-aggregator Rotten Tomatoes gives the film a critic score of 26% based on reviews from 65 critics. The site's consensus states: "A convoluted and predictable plot overshadows the performances". Metacritic gives the film a weighted average score of 43 out of 100 based on reviews from 23 critics, indicating "mixed or average" reviews. Audiences polled by CinemaScore gave the film an average grade of "A-" on an A+ to F scale.

James Berardinelli gave the film 2.5 out 4 describing the film as having "Solid directing and good acting!"

Roger Ebert of the Chicago Sun Times gave the film 1.5 stars out of 4.

=== Box office ===
The film underperformed at the box-office, grossing only $34,105,207 in the United States and Canada. The film won a Genesis Award for its themes of animal rights. On the day of the premiere for this film in Orlando, FL, Cuba Gooding, Jr. added his handprints to a star outside of the Chinese Theater at MGM Studios, a park at Walt Disney World. This walk of fame is a replica of the famous Walk of Fame in Hollywood, California.

== Soundtrack ==
Instinct

Film score by Danny Elfman
- Released: 1999

Danny Elfman chronology
Men in Black (1997)	Instinct (1999)	Sleepy Hollow (1999)

1. "Main Title"
2. "Into the Wild"
3. "Back to the Forest"
4. "Everybody Goes"
5. "The Killing"
6. "The Riot"
7. "Escape"
8. "End Credits"
