= The Story of B =

1996 novel by Daniel Quinn

- First edition
- Author: Daniel Quinn
- Language: English
- Publisher: Bantam Dell
- Publication date: December 1996
- Publication place: United States
- Media type: Print (hardback & paperback)
- Pages: 325 pp
- ISBN: 0-553-10053-X
- OCLC: 34663431
- Dewey Decimal: 813/.54 20
- LC Class: PS3567.U338 S76 1996
- Preceded by: Ishmael
- Followed by: My Ishmael

The Story of B is a 1996 philosophical novel written by Daniel Quinn and published by Bantam Publishing. It chronicles a young priest's movement away from his religion and toward the environmentalist teachings of an international lecturer known as "B".

The Story of B expands upon many of the philosophical ideas introduced in Quinn's 1992 novel Ishmael, and acts as the spiritual successor to both this book and My Ishmael, also written by Quinn.

== Plot summary ==
The Story of B is presented as a diary of the American first-person narrator and protagonist, Fr. Jared Osborne, a Roman Catholic priest of the (fictitious) Laurentian order. The Laurentians have traditionally made it their duty to be the first group to recognize the Antichrist. With this mission in mind, an esteemed member of the order, Fr. Bernard Lulfre, personally tasks Jared with investigating an itinerant American lecturer, Charles Atterley, who has gained notable attention in Europe and whose ideas the Laurentians consider a potential danger to humankind. Although told that Atterley was last spotted in Austria, Jared is initially unable to track down the enigmatic preacher. Upon discovering that Atterley is more commonly known to the public as "B", Jared at last discovers him on a lecture circuit throughout major cities in Germany. Jared begins to attend each of B's speeches and takes verbatim notes that he faxes back to Lulfre. Ultimately pressed for a judgment on the possibility of B's being the Antichrist, Jared is driven to penetrate B's inner circle where he soon finds his religious foundations shaken to their core.

Jared meets with and soon gets to know B personally. Although B immediately understands that Jared is a potential threat to himself and his movement, he does not seem to be as suspicious of or cold toward Jared as are the rest of B's cohort, including B's closest companion, the extremely distrusting, lupus-stricken Shirin. Instead, B welcomes Jared and seems legitimately motivated to educate him, even presenting his teachings to Jared one-on-one. Among the tenets of B's philosophy are: an advocacy of neotribalism and the "Great Remembering"—which is his idea humanity has forgotten its hunter-gatherer history and should reclaim this forgotten knowledge that once steadily supported humanity's survival—as well as an opposition to "totalitarian agriculture", the style of agriculture whereby its practitioners destroy all competition and assume all resources are made only for their own use. Jared finds himself logically supporting these and others of B's ideas, though is unable to rationalize them in terms of his religious convictions.

On a train after one of B's lectures, Jared stumbles upon the murdered body of B in an empty railroad car. B's followers immediately suspect Jared or his organization. To Jared's surprise, Shirin resumes Atterley's lectures where he left off and claims that she is now B. Even more surprising, she begrudgingly continues to personally tutor Jared in B's philosophy, though she openly calls Jared stupid, not because he lacks the capacity to learn but because she has never seen a person "with so much mental equipment being put to so little use". Shirin's further teachings include the idea of a Law of Life, the concept that storytelling may be a genetic characteristic of humans, the promotion of animism, and the notion that totalitarian agriculture results in ecological imbalance and over-population, which themselves are rapidly leading to humankind's self-destruction. Jared begins to see how he cannot remain devout to his religion and in agreement with B's teachings simultaneously.

The diary abruptly picks up when Jared regains consciousness after surviving a mysterious explosion. In the hospital, Jared attempts to piece together his memories, chronicling that one of B's lecture theatres was bombed, and Shirin and B's inner circle are presumably all dead. Flown back to the United States to recuperate, Jared eventually confronts Fr. Lulfre, from whom he learns that the Laurentian order indeed authorized both Atterley's assassination and the bombing of the theatre. Jared renounces his devotion to the order and returns hastily back to Europe, desperately searching for any information about possible survivors of the bombing and lamenting his lack of knowledge about the people he seeks out, for example, the fact that he never even learned Shirin's last name. Ultimately, Jared recalls that the theatre had a tunnel through which Shirin and the others might have escaped. Visiting the mouth of the tunnel, which is barricaded by wooden planks, Jared finds contact information engraved in the wood. He is later reunited with Shirin and the others, and the memory comes flooding in that he warned them to flee moments before the explosion, thus saving their lives.

A brief epilogue explains that Jared and Shirin plan to completely disappear from the public eye together. Moments before Jared must leave to board a plane, he urges the spreading of B's philosophy and writes the final words of his diary: that Charles Atterley, Shirin, he, and the reader, too, are all B.

== The Teachings of B ==
B's spoken lectures in Germany are fully written out at the end of the book in a roughly 80-page-long appendix called "The Public Teachings" (with a header on each of the following pages that reads "The Teachings of B"). Although the main text of the book is written in first-person point of view from Jared’s perspective, the author Quinn's real-life perspective echoes that of B, written in this appendix. The following teachings are from the lectures of B and represent Daniel Quinn’s historically-based ideas of human evolution and the future of human history.

=== The Great Forgetting ===
The "Great Forgetting" is the term B uses to describe an occurrence during the formative millennia of our civilization. What was forgotten is that there was a time when people lived without civilization and were sustained primarily by hunting and gathering rather than by large-scale animal husbandry and agriculture. By the time history began to be written down, thousands of years had passed since abandoning the hunter-gatherer lifestyle and it had been assumed that people had come into existence farming. B argues that our knowledge and worldview today would be greatly altered had the foundation thinkers of our culture known there was history beyond the beginning of civilization.

When paleontology uncovered three million years' worth of human generations, making it untenable that humanity, agriculture, and civilization all began at roughly the same time, our worldview was still not affected. Instead, humanity used terms like “pre-history” and “Agricultural Revolution” to label these events, rather than grafting their ramifications into our societal fabric.

=== Food and population control ===
A continual theme through B’s teachings is that population growth is dependent upon food production, with increases in food production leading to increases in population.

B's (i.e. Quinn's) thinking here should not be confused with the ideas of Thomas Malthus, who made the prediction that population would outrun food supply. In B's own words, "Malthus's warning was about the inevitable failure of totalitarian agriculture. My warning is about its continued success." Quinn characterizes the Malthusian problem as "How are we going to FEED all these people?" and contrasts this with his own: "How are we going to stop PRODUCING all these people?"

==== ABCs of ecology ====
To better exemplify his ideas of food production and population control, B introduces the ABCs of Ecology.

- Part A: The first part of ecology consists purely of food. Food is best described as all life forms.
- Part B: The second part of ecology consists of how populations are affected by the food supply. B explains that population and food supply are in a delicate balance: "As food populations increase, feeder populations increase. As feeder populations increase, food populations decrease. As food populations decrease, feeder populations decrease. As feeder populations decrease, food populations increase."

=== History of humanity since the Great Forgetting ===
The people of our culture established a style of agriculture that B labels "totalitarian agriculture." "Prehistoric" hunters and gatherers operated according to a worldview that promoted coexistence and limited competition between predator and prey. However, the totalitarian agriculturist operates with the worldview that the world is theirs to control and all the food in the world is theirs to produce and eat.

Totalitarian agriculturists, while originally representing a single society, eventually began to overrun other societies as their food supply and populations grew. (B sometimes calls the totalitarian agriculturists "Takers," a term first used by Ishmael in his eponymous novel). B notes that even tribal societies who battle with and claim victory over other ones do not normally force their defeated enemies to assimilate as do the members of our own world-dominating Taker culture. B comments, "The Tak [that is, B's name the earliest members of the Taker culture] had the remarkable and unprecedented idea that everyone should live the way they lived. It's impossible to exaggerate how unusual this made them. I can't name a single other [tribalistic] people in history who made it a goal to proselytize their neighbors."

Under proliferation of totalitarian agriculture, the world population began to double, first taking 2000 years; then taking 1600 years; and eventually only taking 200 years between 1700 and 1900 AD; then again between 1900 and 1960 AD; and yet again between 1960 and 1996 AD. Over the last 10,000 years, this single society has expanded to include 99.8% of the world’s population.

B argues that this exponential growth of the human population is not sustainable. He points to several major problems in our society that he claims arose from over-produced food and an over-crowded population. He states that war, crime, famine, plague, an exploited labor force, drug abuse, slavery, rebellion, and genocide have resulted from Totalitarian Agriculturists' continual expansion. B emphasizes that to reverse the damage we have caused, humankind does not inherently need to change, but rather a single culture has to be changed.

=== Collapse of culture ===
B uses the phrase “cultural collapse” to describe the point of history that we are living through today. He believes that circumstances have rendered the cultural mythology of the Takers meaningless to its people. When this happens to a culture, B states, things fall apart. "Order and purpose are replaced by chaos and bewilderment. People lose the will to live, become listless, become violent, become suicidal, and take to drink, drugs, and crime... laws, customs and institutions fall into disuse and disrespect, especially among the young, who see that even their elders can no longer make sense of them."

=== The Great Remembering ===
During his lectures, B introduces the Great Remembering as this generation’s most needed response to the Great Forgetting. He comments that, because we have already experienced a collapse of culture, our society is ready to abandon our totalitarian agriculture and industrial trends. B uses the examples of tribal cultures as the basis for this new society.

He claims that the "Great Forgetting blinds us to the fact that we are biological species in a community of biological species and are not exempt or exemptible from the forces that shape all life on this planet." He declares that what was forgotten in the Great Forgetting must be remembered in order for us to recognize "that what cannot work for any species will not work for us either."

=== Tribal societies ===
B looks to tribal societies as models for future societies because they exhibited 3 million years of societal evolution before being overtaken by the totalitarian agriculturalist.

B specifically looks at tribal law as a basis for law in the future. In hunter/gatherer tribes, there are no formal laws, only inherent practices that determine the identity of the tribe. Tribes do not write or invent their laws, but honor codes of conduct that arise from years of social evolution. B rejects the modern idea that there is one set moral standard for people to live by. Instead, he argues that the laws and customs that arise from each tribe are sustainable and “right” in their own way because they work for the tribe. Tribal societies offer a tested-true way for people to live and work today as well as they ever did.

B acknowledges that tribes make war on one another, but for a different reason than Taker countries. Taker countries make war to gain resources or expand territory, but a tribe attacks another tribe to remind themselves that they have a tribal identity and that they are different from the other tribe. Again, this is a sustainable model, because little harm is done to either side in the war, tribal boundaries are maintained, and after the brief war, normal relations between tribes are restored.

=== Salvation ===
B finally discusses the idea of salvation and the organized institutions in the Taker society that he calls "salvationist religions." He states that humans only began to think that they needed saving from humanity (i.e. themselves) because of the historical evolution of war, famine, etc., that resulted from totalitarian agriculture. The need for salvation by a Savior, he argues, like civilization and war, is not inherent to humanity but is a condition created by any human society, such as our own global one, that violates the Law of Life i.e. by practicing totalitarian agriculture. B asserts that humanity and the world do not need spiritual salvation, but, rather, that members of our one particular type of culture need to change their minds and actions if the human species is to survive in the world.

B's final comment is that he is indeed, as accusers have said, the Antichrist, or more appropriately: the Antisavior. B calls for followers to abandon the idea that humanity needs to be saved from itself and to tell accusers that "we're straying from the path of salvation...but not for love of vice and wickedness as you contemptuously imagined we might. We're straying from the path of salvation for love of the world."
