= Law of Life =

The Law of Life is a term coined by author Farley Mowat in his 1952 book People of the Deer, and popularized by Daniel Quinn, to denote a universal system of various natural principles, any of which tend to best foster life—in other words, any of which best guides behavior that tends toward the reproductive success and survival of some particular gene pool. The idea posits that, in general, the most fit organisms instinctively behave according to some natural rule (often, these rules vary among and are specific to the species). Since every organism has some instinctive "law" it can follow to be the most reproductively successful, this very notion is a sort of law itself, true of all living beings: thus, the Law of Life.

In his 1996 novel, The Story of B, Quinn writes, "A biologist would probably say what I'm calling the Law of Life is just a collection of evolutionarily stable strategies— the universal set of such strategies, in fact."

Quinn points out that this is a physical law, like gravity, not a commandment like "thou shalt not kill" nor a legislative ruling like "pay taxes". As he puts it, the latter two are written where only man can read them (in books), and that they can be changed by a vote, while the Law of Life is written in the fabric of the universe and cannot be broken. Those who do not follow the law simply won't live.
