= My Ishmael =

1997 English-language book by Daniel Quinn

- First edition
- Author: Daniel Quinn
- Cover artist: Claude Anderson
- Language: English
- Publisher: Bantam Books
- Publication date: December 1997
- Publication place: United States
- Media type: Print (hardback)
- Pages: 274
- ISBN: 0-553-10636-8
- OCLC: 37401101
- Dewey Decimal: 813/.54 21
- LC Class: PS3567.U338 M9 1997
- Preceded by: Ishmael, The Story of B

My Ishmael is a 1997 novel by Daniel Quinn that is a sequel—and largely a sidequel—to Ishmael. With its time frame largely simultaneous with Ishmael, its plot precedes the fictional events of its 1996 spiritual successor, The Story of B. Like Ishmael, My Ishmael largely revolves around a Socratic dialogue between the sapient gorilla, Ishmael, and a student, involving his philosophy regarding tribal society. Ishmael's pupil in My Ishmael is a twelve-year-old female protagonist, Julie Gerchak. The plot details her visits to Ishmael and her journey to Africa to prepare for Ishmael's return to his homeland.

== Summary ==
=== Background ===
My Ishmael is presented as the final copy of a book published by Julie Gerchak, who has herself read the book Ishmael. At the time she begins writing, Julie is sixteen; however, during the main plot of her story, she is merely twelve years old: "a plucky, resourceful, near-genius with a wobbly home life". Like the narrator of Ishmael, Julie discovers a newspaper advertisement from a teacher seeking a student who wishes to save the world. Julie discovers that the teacher is a gorilla, Ishmael, with whom she can communicate telepathically. When she asks Ishmael if he will teach her, he is initially ambivalent due to her very young age, though her skillful arguments convince him that she may indeed be open to his maieutic teaching style.

=== Plot ===
The novel mostly proceeds as a dialogue between Julie and Ishmael. Julie has come to Ishmael in search of a teacher due to anxiety about civilization's destructive impact on human well-being and the environment. She recounts a daydream of being recruited to go on a space mission to visit other planets and thereby learn solutions around the galaxy for Earth's many problems. Julie and Ishmael discuss a variety of topics, including the hidden mythology that drives our modern industrial and agricultural civilization, which disparages the foraging lifestyle of other societies; the evolution of humans by natural selection; the rise of social hierarchies; and the differing values between traditional foraging societies versus modern civilization. Julie ultimately learns she does not need to travel around the galaxy to find solutions. Instead, Ishmael directs her to think about how historical and present-day evidence demonstrate the successes of indigenous tribal communities.

Julie visits Ishmael as often as possible and notices a man sometimes leaving Ishmael's office: Alan Lomax (later revealed as the previously unnamed narrator of Ishmael). Julie feels an odd distaste for Alan, although she has never met him face-to-face. Ishmael maintains both pupils, though his teachings are not necessarily the same for each. With Julie, Ishmael discusses how human communities living in the wild compete but do not go as far as war, which is largely an invention of modern civilization. He also discusses how major social institutions like law and education operate differently and more effectively in forager societies.

Julie eventually meets Art "Artie" Owens, born in the Belgian Congo (later Zaire), a friend of Ishmael who intends to help him return to the West African jungle. Owens is a lifelong naturalist who grew up with Mokonzi Nkemi, the president of the (fictional) Republic of Mabili, a nation that has recently gained independence from Zaire. Owens, meanwhile, became a dual citizen of Zaire and Belgium, traveling to the United States and attending Cornell University, where he met a student who introduced him to Ishmael. Later, in Zaire, Owens helped the revolution that founded Mabili and became its interior minister for only a few months before he realized Nkemi's corrupt dealings with Zaire's President Mobutu. Exiled from Mabili, Owens fled back to the U.S. and purchased an animal menagerie, where he plans to house Ishmael for his last days in the U.S.

Ishmael and Owens now ask Julie to attain President Nkemi's permission to return Ishmael to the Mabili wilderness. Julie is astounded at first, initially wondering if they should ask Alan Lomax for help instead, but they deem Alan untrustworthy. She finally agrees to the potentially dangerous five-day trip and is drilled on how to act and be wary in African cities, including conversing with Mabili's leaders. In Mabili, Julie poses as a student who has won an essay-writing contest promising her a trip to meet Mabili's president. Upon meeting Nkemi, Julie claims that Ishmael is a gorilla who has gathered an American following of supporters who wish to see him successfully released back into the wild. When Nkemi asks why he should help her, she charms him with a parable asserting that they are bringing back to the land a beloved creature that was once lost.

Back in the U.S., Julie hears from Owens that Ishmael has completed the journey back to Africa. She also learns why Alan Lomax was not trusted with this mission: he was becoming too attached to Ishmael as his teacher. With this in mind, Alan is told that Ishmael has died. Such a ploy is regarded as successful since it motivates Alan to write the book Ishmael in 1992. Though Julie wishes to publish her book, this very story, Owens forbids her from doing so until Mobutu's regime (and with it, Nkemi's) is on the verge of collapse since the book might put Ishmael in danger by revealing to the authorities that he is still alive. However, in 1997 (when Julie is eighteen years old), Owens finally contacts Julie, telling her that Mobutu's days are numbered and she may publish My Ishmael at last.

== Ideas and themes ==
=== Takers and Leavers ===
Ishmael launches into a discussion of "Mother Culture", the personification of the often hidden influences of our culture on our lives, behavior, and worldview. He expounds upon civilization's delusion that human intelligence is a curse inherently propelling us toward making terrible decisions and our culture's fallacy that all human societies (or, at least, all the "civilized" ones) developed from foraging to a superior state of farming, neglecting the tribes all over the world who continue the foraging lifestyle. Ishmael refers to humanity in terms of "Takers" (members of the dominant globalized culture that destroys other peoples or forces them to assimilate) and Leavers (members of the countless cultures who lived or continue to live in tribal societies). He also examines evolutionary processes and how they tend to maintain behaviors that best sustain some particular gene pool and enforce a sort of equilibrium in which no single organism or group of organisms overwhelms the competition for resources in the biological community. He claims that Takers depart from this self-sustaining balance by keeping their resources, primarily food, under "lock and key." This, he claims, creates hierarchical social structures that, abandoning the cooperating ethos of Leavers, result in distress and conflict within the society, such as crime, suicide, poverty, famine, and senseless violence. He argues that although Taker societies flourish in terms of material wealth – such as technological advancement and greater scientific progress – they fail utterly with regard to what he believes to be actual wealth: the sense of belonging and security that hold together the fabric of human tribal societies.

=== Competition and war ===
Ishmael describes how tribes live alongside other tribes in a state of "erratic retaliation", meaning that they avenge their neighbors' acts of aggression but do not behave too predictably. This allows people to compete effectively for resources without engaging "in mortal combat for every little thing". Furthermore, Ishmael distinguishes erratic retaliation from war, a feature of Taker societies, which he describes thus: "Retaliation is giving as good as you get; going to war is conquering people to make them do what you want". Ishmael also outlines his preference for the Leaver (or tribal) notion of law, which is generally unwritten knowledge of how to deal with undesirable behaviors within the tribe. He explains that this is different from the Taker concept of law because since "tribal peoples didn't waste time with laws they knew would be disobeyed, disobedience was not a problem for them. Tribal law didn't outlaw mischief. It spelled out ways to undo mischief, so people were glad to obey it".

=== Education ===
Eventually, Ishmael's teachings turn toward the subject of formal education, which he argues is merely a way to keep children out of the work force and is otherwise unnecessary because humans learn on their own, naturally following their own interests and picking up information necessary to operate in their culture. In tribal cultures, this information inherently includes that which is relevant to surviving in the wild by learning to hunt and gather food, as well as easily adopting their culture's values, customs, and so on. In Taker culture, the otherwise automatic process of learning is hindered and convoluted by the institution of formal education, which largely forces students to study abstract topics that they do not directly apply outside of the classroom and that they therefore largely forget once the information is no longer required to pass tests or other evaluations.

=== Inspiration and innovation ===
When Ishmael asserts that humans must strive to belong to functional and secure communities, Julie asks for concrete examples of how this can be achieved. Ishmael praises the utter strength of human innovation, citing positive examples from the Industrial Revolution and claims that this will lead, and has already led, to a diversity of new models, including the Sudbury school, the Gesundheit! Institute, and intentional communities. He claims that humans must together create these answers little by little and that innovators in fact gradually build upon prior ideas toward eventual progress. He concludes his teachings with an iteration of his philosophy summed up in a single sentence: "There is no one right way for people to live".

== Influence ==
Tosin Abasi, founder of rock band Animals as Leaders in 2008, claims that My Ishmael was an inspiration for the band's name.

This book was mentioned by James Lee in his list of demands when he took several hostages at the Discovery Channel Headquarters on September 1, 2010. He demanded the network air daily programs based on the book, specifically content found on pages 207 through 212 (the chapter "Revolutionaries"). Quinn regarded Lee as "a fanatic" who warped his ideas.
