= Tribe =

Human social group

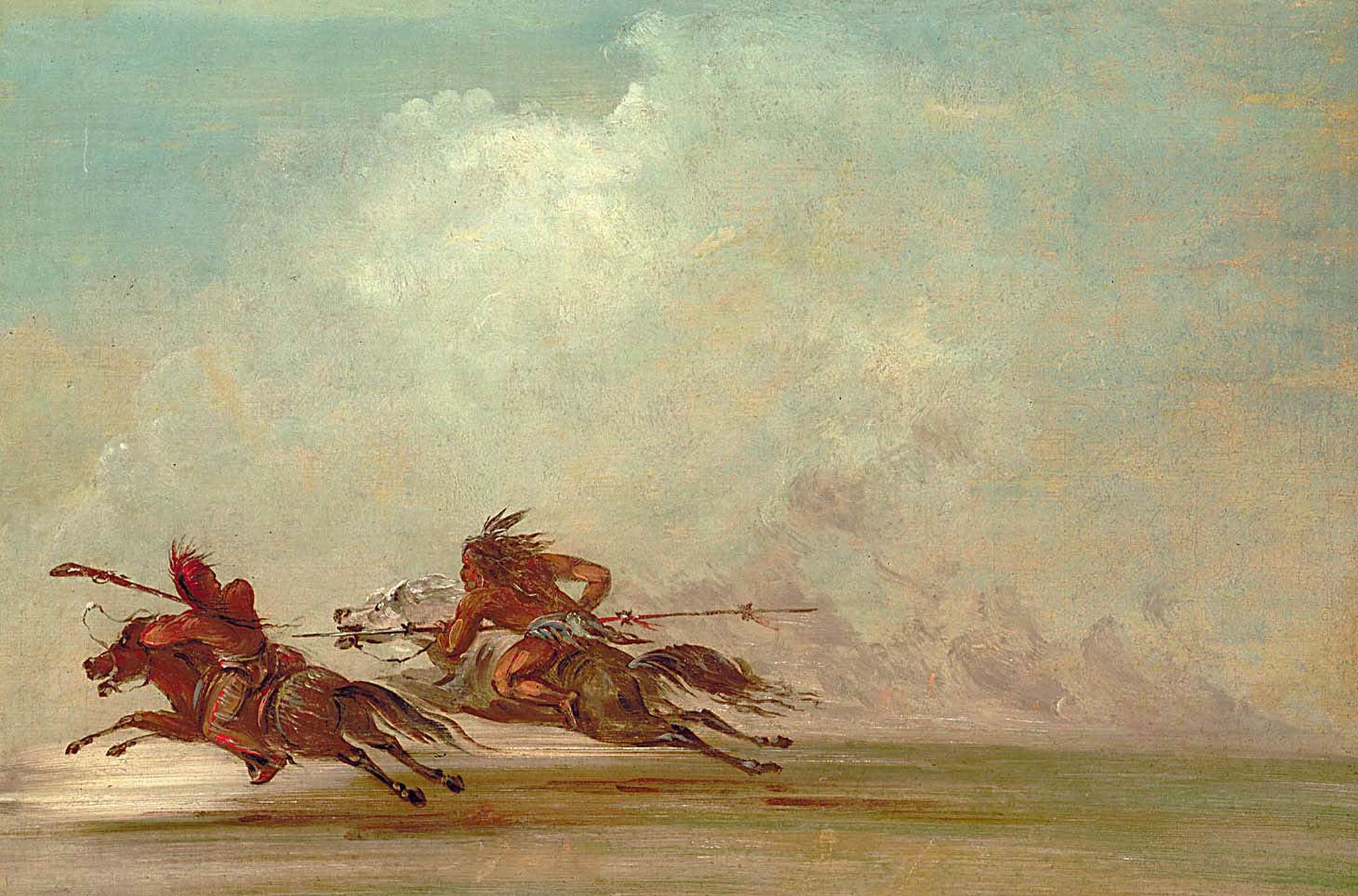
Tribal war on the plains. Comanche (right) trying to lance an Osage warrior. Painting by George Catlin, 1834

The term tribe is used in many different contexts to refer to a category of human social group. The predominant worldwide use of the term in English is in the discipline of anthropology. The definition is contested, in part due to conflicting theoretical understandings of social and kinship structures, and also reflecting the problematic application of this concept to extremely diverse human societies. Its concept is often contrasted by anthropologists with other social and kinship groups, being hierarchically larger than a lineage or clan, but smaller than a chiefdom, ethnicity, nation or state. These terms are similarly disputed. In some cases, tribes have legal recognition and some degree of political autonomy from national or federal government, but this legalistic usage of the term may conflict with anthropological definitions.

In the United States (US), Native American tribes are legally considered to have "domestic dependent nation" status within the territorial United States, with a government-to-government relationship with the federal government.

== Etymology ==
The modern English word tribe stems from Middle English tribu, which ultimately derives from Latin tribus. According to the Oxford English Dictionary, it remains unclear if this form is the result of a borrowing from a Romance language source (such as Old French tribu) or if the form is a result of borrowing directly from Latin (the Middle English plural tribuz 1250 may be a direct representation of Latin plural tribūs). Modern English tribe may also be a result of a common pattern wherein English borrows nouns directly from Latin and drops suffixes, including -us. Latin tribus is held to derive from the Proto-Indo-European compound *tri-dʰh₁u/o- ('rendered in three, tripartite division'; compare with Umbrian trifu 'trinity, district', Sanskrit trídha 'threefold').

== Classification ==
Considerable debate has accompanied efforts to define and characterize tribes. In the popular imagination, tribes reflect a primordial social structure from which all subsequent civilizations and states developed. Anthropologist Elman Service presented a system of classification for societies in all human cultures, based on the evolution of social inequality and the role of the state. This system of classification contains four categories:

- Hunter-gatherer bands that are generally egalitarian
- Tribal societies with some limited instances of social rank and prestige
- Stratified tribal societies led by chieftains (see Chiefdom)
- Civilizations, with complex social hierarchies and organized, institutional governments

Tribes are therefore considered to be a political unit formed from an organisation of families (including clans and lineages) based on social or ideological solidarity. Membership of a tribe may be understood as being based on factors such as kinship ("clan"), ethnicity ("race"), language, dwelling place, political group, religious beliefs, oral tradition or cultural practices.

Archaeologists continue to explore the development of pre-state tribes. Current research suggests that tribal structures constituted one type of adaptation to situations providing plentiful yet unpredictable resources. Such structures proved flexible enough to coordinate production and distribution of food in times of scarcity, without limiting or constraining people during times of surplus. Anthropologist Morton Fried argued in 1967 that bands organized into tribes in order to resist the violence and exploitation of early kingdoms and states. He wrote:

In fact, there is no absolute necessity for a tribal stage as defined by Sahlins and Service, no necessity, that is, for such a stage to appear in the transit from a single settlement with embedded political organization, to a complex-state structured polity. Such a developmental process could have gone on within a unit that we may conceptualize as a city-state, such a unit as Jericho might have become in its later stages ... tribalism can be viewed as reaction to the formation of complex political structure rather than a necessary preliminary stage in its evolution.

=== Controversy and usage deprecation ===
The term "tribe" was in common use in the field of anthropology until the late 1950s and 1960s. The continued use of the term has attracted controversy among anthropologists and other academics active in the social sciences with scholars of anthropological and ethnohistorical research challenging the utility of the concept. In 1970, anthropologist J. Clyde Mitchell wrote:

The tribe, a long respected category of analysis in anthropology, has recently been the object of some scrutiny by anthropologists ... Doubts about the utility of the tribe as an analytical category have almost certainly arisen out of the rapid involvement of peoples, even in the remotest parts of the globe, in political, economic and sometimes direct social relationship with industrial nations. The doubts, however, are based ultimately on the definition and meaning which different scholars give to the term 'tribe', its adjective 'tribal', and its abstract form 'tribalism'.

Despite the membership boundaries for a tribe being conceptually simple, in reality they are often vague and subject to change over time. In his 1975 study, The Notion of the Tribe, Fried provided numerous examples of tribes that encompassed members who spoke different languages and practiced different rituals, or who shared languages and rituals with members of other tribes. Similarly, he provided examples of tribes in which people followed different political leaders, or followed the same leaders as members of other tribes. He concluded that tribes in general are characterized by fluid boundaries, heterogeneity and dynamism, and are not parochial.

Part of the difficulty with the term is that it seeks to construct and apply a common conceptual framework across diverse cultures and peoples. Different anthropologists studying different peoples therefore draw conflicting conclusions about the nature, structure and practices of tribes. Writing on the Kurdish peoples, anthropologist Martin van Bruinessen argued, "the terms of standard anthropological usage, 'tribe', 'clan' and 'lineage' appear to be a straitjacket that ill fits the social reality of Kurdistan".

There are further negative connotations of the term "tribe" that have reduced its use. Writing in 2013, scholar Matthew Ortoleva noted that "like the word Indian, [t]ribe is a word that has connotations of colonialism." Survival International says "It is important to make the distinction between tribal and indigenous because tribal peoples have a special status acknowledged in international law as well as problems in addition to those faced by the wider category of indigenous peoples."

== Present-day ==
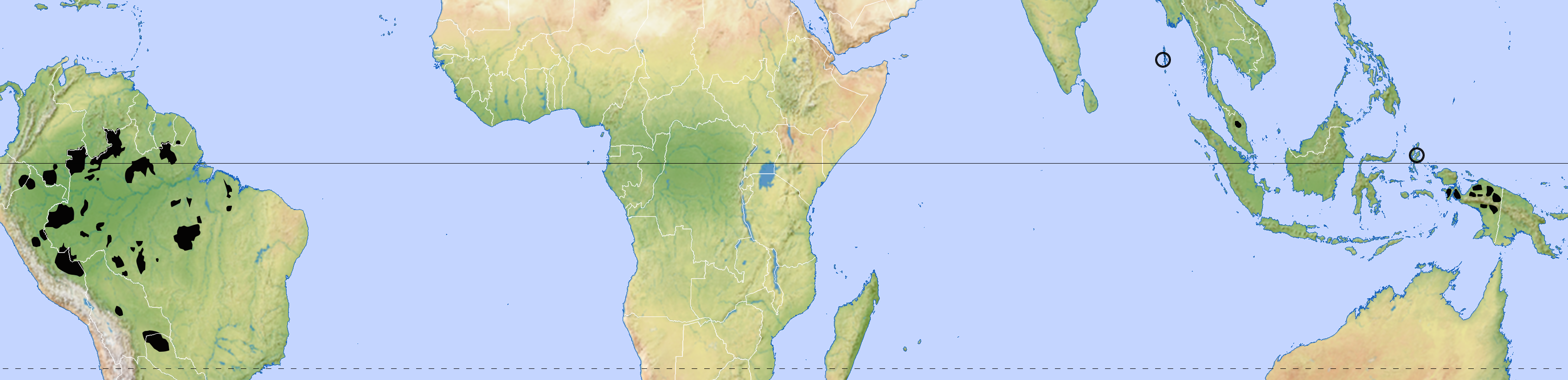
A map of uncontacted tribes, around the start of the 21st century

Few tribes today remain isolated from the development of the modern state system. Most tribes have lost their legitimacy to conduct traditional functions, such as tithing, delivering justice and defending territory, with these being replaced by states' functions and institutions, such as taxation, law courts and the military. Most have suffered decline and loss of cultural identity. Some have adapted to the new political context and transformed their culture and practices in order to survive, whilst others have secured legal rights and protections.

Fried proposed that most surviving tribes do not have their origin in pre-state tribes, but rather in pre-state bands. Such "secondary" tribes, he suggested, developed as modern products of state expansion. Bands comprise small, mobile, and fluid social formations with weak leadership. They do not generate surpluses, pay no taxes, and support no standing army. Fried argued that secondary tribes develop in one of two ways. First, states could set them up as means to extend administrative and economic influence in their hinterland, where direct political control costs too much. States would encourage (or require) people on their frontiers to form more clearly bounded and centralized polities, because such polities could begin producing surpluses and taxes, and would have a leadership responsive to the needs of neighboring states (the so-called tribes of the United States or British India provide good examples of this). The British favored the label "aboriginal tribe" for some communities.

India adopted a republican constitution in 1950, after three years of debate in its Constituent Assembly. During the debate, Jaipal Singh, a member of Munda tribe from Central India advocated for special provisions for the 'Adibasi' -- a translation into Hindi of 'aboriginal'. His arguments proved persuasive. These communities were to have seats in the legislatures and positions in government employment 'reserved' for them. Each of the assembly members prepared a list of communities that deserved special protections. These names were listed in a "Schedule" (appendix) to the Constitution. So these came to be called the 'Scheduled Tribes', often abbreviated to ST.

Second, bands could form "secondary" tribes as a means to defend against state expansion. Members of bands would form more clearly bounded and centralized polities, because such polities could begin producing surpluses that could support a standing army that could fight against states, and they would have a leadership that could co-ordinate economic production and military activities.

In the Native American tribes of North America, tribes are considered sovereign nations, that have retained their sovereignty or been granted legal recognition by the federal government.

Yemen is notable as the most tribal nation in the Arab world, largely due to the significant influence of tribal leaders and their deep integration into various aspects of the state. Estimates vary, with approximately 200 tribes in Yemen, although some reports list more than 400.

=== Primatological culture and hominid taxonomy ===
In late-20th and early-21st century primatology, paleoanthropology, and evolutionary biology, the application of socio-political terminology to non-human primates emerged as a distinct area of discourse. Traditional taxonomic nomenclature utilizes "tribe" strictly as a biological rank between subfamily and genus (such as Hominini, which encompasses both modern humans and chimpanzees). However, modern researchers and theorists have increasingly argued for a behavioral and sociopolitical application of the term to mirror definitions used in cultural anthropology.

Under this behavioral framework, a structural distinction is made between a tribe and a troop based on the presence of tool manufacture and cultural transmission:

- Tribe is defined behaviorally as a close-knit group of any species within the Hominidae (great ape) family that actively utilizes tools and transmits distinct, localized survival tactics to offspring across generations. Because these behaviors vary geographically between separate populations of the same species, they constitute a form of non-human cultural variation. Examples include the Gombe tribe of chimpanzees (noted for termite-fishing with customized twigs) and the Taï tribe (noted for utilizing stone hammers and wooden anvils to crack coula nuts).
- Troop is retained strictly for groups of non-hominid simians (such as monkeys or baboons). While certain non-hominid species may exhibit localized behaviors or primitive tool utilization (e.g., capuchin monkeys), their social structures are classified as troops to preserve the evolutionary and cognitive boundary of the hominid lineage.

This classification system argues that hominid groups using tools possess a social heritage and generational history that elevates them beyond instinctual animal aggregations. Concurrently, to avoid linguistic ambiguity between human and non-human hominid populations, this framework suggests that specific human groups be referred to by their autonomous proper titles rather than appending the generic noun "tribe," thereby allowing the term to clearly communicate non-human hominid cultural communities in literature.

E.g

- "The Sentinelese"
- "The Gombe tribe"

== See also ==
- Adivasi
- Anarcho-primitivism
- Band society
- Ethnic religion
- Faz'ah
- Federally recognized tribes in the United States
- Gens
- Matrilineality
- Meenas
- Micronation
- New Tribal Revolution
- Nomad
- Pantribal sodalities
- Patrilineality
- Segmentary society
- Shahsevan
- Social group
- Stateless society
- Tribal chief
- Tribal name
- Tribal sovereignty
- Tribal warfare
- Tribalism
  - Neotribalism
- Tribe (Internet)
- Tribes of Arabia
- Twelve Tribes of Israel
