= Dreamer =

Dreamer may refer to:

== General use ==
- A person experiencing a dream
- An idealist
- DREAMer, an immigrant with United States resident status under the DREAM Act or DACA

== Arts, entertainment, and media ==
=== Music ===
==== Albums ====
- Dreamer (Bobby Bland album), 1974
- Dreamer (Haste the Day album), 2008
- Dreamer (Caldera album), 1979
- Dreamer (Emmerson Nogueira album), 2008
- Dreamer (Soraya Arnelas album), 2010
- Dreamer, a 1967 album by Labelle
- Dreamer, a Japanese-language album by Hound Dog
- Dreamer (Eliane Elias album), 2004

==== Songs ====
- "Dreamer" (Alisa Kozhikina song), 2014
- "Dreamer" (Antônio Carlos Jobim song), 1962
- "Dreamer" (Axwell & Ingrosso song), 2017
- "Dreamer" (Chris Brown song), 2008
- "Dreamer" (Dennis Wilson song), 1977
- "Dreamer" (Europe song), 1984
- "Dreamers" (Jung Kook song), 2022
- "Dreamer" (Livin' Joy song), 1994
- "Dreamer" (Ozzy Osbourne song), 2001
- "Dreamer" (Martin Garrix song), 2018
- "Dreamer" (Sunrise Avenue song), 2018
- "Dreamer" (Supertramp song), 1974
- "Dreamer" (Tune in Tokyo song), 2010
- "Dreamer" (Alan Walker song), 2023
- "Dreamer", from The B. B. & Q. Band's 1985 album Genie
- "Dreamer", from Charli XCX's mixtape Number 1 Angel
- "Dreamer", from Hilary Duff's third studio album, Dignity
- "Dreamer", from the Jacksons' self-titled 1976 album, The Jacksons
- "Dreamer", from Laufey's 2023 album, Bewitched
- "Dreamer", from Prince's 2009 album LOtUSFLOW3R
- "Dreamer", from Tokio Hotel's album 2001
- "Dreamer", from Tomorrow X Together's album The Name Chapter: Freefall
- "Dreamer", from Toni Childs' album Union
- "Dreamer", from Trippie Redd's (reissue) album Neon Shark vs Pegasus
- "Dreamer", from Uriah Heep's album Sweet Freedom

=== Other uses in arts, entertainment, and media ===
- Dreamer (1979 film), a 1979 Bowling film
- Dreamer (2005 film), a 2005 film starring Dakota Fanning and Kurt Russell
- Dreamer (advertisement), a 2001 advertising campaign for Guinness
- Dreamer (novel), a 1988 novel by Daniel Quinn
- Nia Nal, also known as Dreamer, a fictional character in the TV series Supergirl

== Other uses ==
- Dreamers, a common name for the deep-sea anglerfishes family Oneirodidae
- PJ-II Dreamer, a two-seat, mid-wing monoplane
- Tommy Dreamer (born 1971), WWE and ECW hardcore wrestler
- Voyah Dreamer, an electric car

== See also ==
- Beautiful Dreamer (disambiguation)
- Dream (disambiguation)
- Dream Lover (disambiguation)
- Dreaming (disambiguation)
- The Dreamer (disambiguation)
- The Dreamers (disambiguation)
