= Dreamtime (disambiguation) =

Dreamtime may refer to a theme in Australian Aboriginal religion and mythology.

Dreamtime may also refer to:

== Music ==
- Dreamtime (musical), a 1992 Broadway musical
- Dreamtime (The Cult album), 1984
- Dreamtime (The Stranglers album), 1986
- Dreamtime (Tom Verlaine album), 1981
- "Dreamtime" (Daryl Hall song), 1986
- "Dreamtime", a song by Tangerine Dream from the album 220 Volt Live
- "Dreamtime", a song by Yes from Magnification (album)
- Dreamtime, a subsidiary label of Peaceville Records

== Other uses ==
- Dreamtime, an audio drama from Doctor Who: The Monthly Adventures
- Dreamtime (book), 1978 anthropological study of witchcraft by Hans Peter Duerr
- Dreamtime (climb), bouldering route in Cresciano, Switzerland
- Dreamtime Village, intentional community in West Lima, Wisconsin
- Paonia, Colorado#Dreamtime Festival, annual music and arts festival near Paonia, Colorado
- Dreamstime, stock photography website
- Dreamtime at the 'G, annual football match between AFL teams Essendon and Richmond
- Dreamtime (CORPS), a 1997 supplement for the role-playing game CORPS
- The Dreamtime Book (1973), Aboriginal myths painted by Ainslie Roberts

== See also ==
- Dream (disambiguation)
- Dreaming (disambiguation)
- Dreamer (disambiguation)
