= Dreaming =

Dreaming, Dreamin', or The Dreaming may refer to:

- Dreaming, experiencing a dream during sleep

== Culture and religion ==
- The Dreaming, a term for the religio-cultural worldview in Australian Aboriginal cultures
- Dreaming (Australian Aboriginal art), a term used for designs in contemporary indigenous Australian art
- The Dreaming: Australia's International Indigenous Festival, an arts and culture festival held from 1997 until 2012

== Film ==
- Dreaming (1944 British film), a comedy film
- Dreaming (1944 German film), a historical musical drama film
- The Dreaming (film), a 1988 Australian horror film

== Music ==
=== Bands ===
- The Dreaming (American band), a 2001–2018 rock band from Hollywood
- The Dreaming (Scottish band), a 1990s Celtic rock band

=== Albums ===
- Dreamin' (album) by Liverpool Express, or the title song, 1978
- The Dreaming (album) by Kate Bush, or the title song (see below), 1982
- Dreaming #11, an EP by Joe Satriani, 1988
- Dreaming (Grace Kelly album), or the title song, 2005
- Dreaming (Michael Rother album), or the title song, 2020
- Dreaming, by Missing Persons, 2020
- The Dreaming (Monsta X album), 2021
- Dreaming (EP), by April, 2015
- Dreamin' (EP), by Hockey Dad, 2014
- Dreaming: The Videos, a music video compilation by Crowded House, 2002

=== Songs ===
- "Dreaming" (Aurora song), 2002
- "Dreaming" (Blondie song), 1979
- "Dreamin'" (Cliff Richard song), 1980
- "Dreamin'" (Dom Dolla song), 2025
- "Dreamin'" (Eddie Friel song), 1995
- "Dreaming" (I Dream song), from children's TV series I Dream, 2004
- "Dreamin'" (Johnny Burnette song), 1960
- "The Dreaming" (song), by Kate Bush, 1982
- "Dreamin'" (Loleatta Holloway song), 1977
- "Dreaming" (M People song), 1999
- "Dreaming" (MN8 song), 1996
- "Dreaming" (Orchestral Manoeuvres in the Dark song), 1988
- "Dreaming" (Scribe song), 2004
- "Dreaming" (Smallpools song), 2013
- "Dreamin'" (Status Quo song), 1986
- "Dreamin'" (Vanessa Williams song), 1986
- "Dreamin'" (Weezer song), 2008
- "Dreamin'" (Will to Power song), 1987
- "Dreamin'" (Young Jeezy song), 2007
- "Dreamin'", by Amos Lee from Amos Lee, 2005
- "Dreaming", by Beyoncé from 4, 2011
- "Dreamin'", by Big K.R.I.T. from Return of 4Eva, 2011
- "Dreaming", by BT from Movement in Still Life, 1999
- "Dreaming", by Camouflage from Relocated, 2006
- "Dreaming", by Cream from Fresh Cream, 1966
- "Dreamin'", by Fat Joe and Remy Ma from Plata O Plomo, 2017
- "Dreaming", by Fool's Garden from 25 Miles to Kissimmee, 2003
- "Dreaming", by Goldfrapp from Head First, 2010
- "Dreamin'", by Kiss from Psycho Circus, 1998
- "Dreaming", by Mac DeMarco from 2, 2012
- "Dreaming", by Man Overboard from Hung Up on Nothing, 2008
- "Dreaming", by Men Without Hats from No Hats Beyond This Point, 2003
- "Dreamin'", by Nipsey Hussle from The Marathon, 2010
- "Dreamin'", by PnB Rock from TrapStar Turnt PopStar, 2019
- "Dreaming", by Pop Smoke from Meet the Woo 2, 2020
- "Dreamin'", by Pras from Win Lose or Draw, 2005
- "Dreaming", by Ruff Driverz, 1998
- "Dreamin'", by the Score, 2019
- "Dreaming", by System of a Down from Hypnotize, 2005
- "Dreaming", by Yngwie Malmsteen from Odyssey, 1988
- "The Dreaming Song", by the Wiggles from Here Comes a Song, 1992

== Other uses ==
- Dreaming (journal), a peer-reviewed academic journal
- Dreaming (sculpture), a sculpture by Jaume Plensa
- The Dreaming (comics), a fictional place in Neil Gaiman's The Sandman series, and a spin-off series of the same name
- The Dreaming (musical), a 2001 musical by Howard Goodall and Charles Hart
- The Dreaming (Tokyopop comic), an English-language manga by Queenie Chan
- The Dreaming, a fictional realm in the role-playing game Changeling: The Dreaming

== See also ==
- Dream (disambiguation)
- Dreamer (disambiguation)
- Dreaming Creek (disambiguation)
- Dreamtime (disambiguation)
