= David Niles (director) =

American television director

David Niles is an American media artist, director, producer, director of photography, engineer, and designer. He opened the first HDTV production facility in the world in France in 1984.. Niles is the director of Niles Creative Group, a design and production facility.

== Career ==
Niles began his early career in New York City migrating from architectural design to live theatre to music composition and eventually to film and television, working as a director, producer, director of photography, editor, art director, set designer, lighting director, technical director and as a composer.

From 1969 through 1987, Niles operated abroad in Paris, France, where, with Gilliane Le Gallic, he founded and designed his production facilities Captain Video and VOIR. Aside from serving the European television market, Canal+, TF1, BBC, Canale 5, Antenne 2, FR3 and Télé Monte-Carlo; Niles created programming for numerous clients including CBS, NBC, ABC, HBO, NHK and ESPN. Niles also created hundreds of music videos and commercials while in France, with the largest stars in Europe and the US Working on many award-winning commercials, documentaries, and Emmy award-winning sports programs like the Tour de France.

While in France, Niles was honored by the French government with the “Chevalier des Arts et des Lettres” for creating the on-air look of all three French television networks, an honor shared with Alfred Hitchcock, Walt Disney, Tim Burton, David Bowie, Philip Glass, Bob Dylan and Bono (U2) to name a few.

In 1984, while still in Paris, Niles created the first HDTV production facility in the world, still under the name Captain Video, producing, editing or directing feature films variety shows, live concerts and documentaries for clients including HBO, CBS Entertainment, Twentieth Century Fox, BBC, ABC Wide World of Sports, Lucasfilm, Merv Griffin Productions, and more; featuring stars like Kathleen Turner, Sting, Isabella Rossellini, Catherine Deneuve, Tom Jones, Shirley Maclaine, Phil Collins, Cher, Joni Mitchell, Kris Kristofferson and many others. Niles produced, directed, shot and edited commercials for Sony, Lancome, L’Oreal, Kellogg’s and countless others.

In 1987, Niles returned to New York City and started 1125 Productions, a then state-of-the-art HDTV television production facility, America’s first full production facility for HDTV, utilizing Sony HDVS equipment. The company acquired the lease to the Ed Sullivan Theater in 1990 and combined their HDTV studio with the landmark theater to house the Broadway show Dreamtime in 1992. The studio was used during the day to shoot HDTV productions with Aerosmith and Crosby, Stills & Nash, and Neil Young for MTV Unplugged, and Tony Bennett, Mick Jagger, Liza Minnelli (for which Niles received an Emmy nomination), Paul McCartney, Aretha Franklin, Itzhak Perlman and Jackie Mason. Niles continued working with clients like HBO and CBS as well; producing the 1987 Tyson vs. Biggs fight, comedy specials, CBS Movie of the Week, the Genesis live concert and much more.

In 1989, Niles directed the first live broadcast of an HDTV program, “Our Common Future”, (NHK Japan), a five hour special, with stars like Elton John, Stevie Wonder, Herbie Hancock, Diana Ross, Christopher Reeve, Sigourney Weaver and a host of others. The show originated from Lincoln Center, in NYC. Niles was also responsible for overseeing the technical aspects of the show, directing it from one of his own HD Mobile video trucks.

== Awards ==
In 1989 Niles received the Gold Astrolabium 1st Prize Award at the International Electronic Cinema Festival in Montreaux, Switzerland for a short HD film titled Moscow Melodies, the first US/Soviet HD co-production, which later aired in the US. That same year he won the citation for the 2nd prize at the International Electronic Cinema Festival with “Year of the Dance”, created and produced by Niles, who also executed the graphics and composed the original score. Niles went on to win numerous awards for his work at the festival in years to come as well.

In 1990 with HD in production and demand growing around the world, the Federal Communications Commission asked Niles to create a series of visual tests for accessing and evaluating competing HDTV Standards; tests would both determine and define the broadcast standard for HDTV in the United States (ATSC). Niles was called on again, this time by Kodak, to create all of the visual tests to assess Film Stock vs. HD. Niles produced, directed, and decided on all content for the tests. Niles continued to develop his industry credentials, developing and testing HD cameras with Panasonic and Sony, HD switchers with Snell & Wilcox, speaking on the current state of HDTV on programs like PBS' NOVA and being the subject of many books and documentaries around the world, on the history of HDTV.

In 1992 Dreamtime was created by Niles based on an original story by Marc Cerrone. Niles also directed, produced, wrote the book for the musical, choreographed and did the scenic design. The show ran for 140 performances. Eddie Bracken, Sonia Jones, and Steve Overland starred in the show which also features Camille Donatacci, Deirdre Imus, Bonnie Comley and Stephanie Daniels. The show; billed as “A New Broadway Musical Experience” combined giant screen images in high definition with live actors, music and laser lighting effects. The audience members were videotaped upon their entrance and became part of the show’s finale thanks to the high tech, quick video editing equipment incorporated into the theater.

In 1995, Niles produced another multimedia extravaganza called “Show Me New York”. Hosted by Jerry Orbach, the show combined HDTV on a 40-foot (12 m) wide screen with a lightshow and fireworks, was a three - part journey combining giant screen High Definition Video, computer controlled effects, live actors and total immersion environments that propelled visitors through the past, present and future of New York City. He executed the conception, design and construction of the theaters and displays as well as directing and editing of all content for the shows. In 1998, Niles consulted and directed the redesigning of Madison Square Garden studio into HDTV production facilities and has begun design for HDTV facilities for Radio City Music Hall.

Early in 1998 and through 2006, Niles moved the facilities downtown; opening ColossalVision, where he provided clients with the highest standard of HDTV production and post-production, with clients such as Lions Gate Films, CBS, Macy's Federated Department Stores, IFC Films, NASA, Sony Music Classics, Panasonic, Sharp and a host of others. During this period he continued consulting for Panasonic, Sony, Disney Imagineering and many others, while also working for Radio City Music Hall on their conversion to HD.

In 2001, the Blue Note host to the concert documentary Rendezvous in New York, which documented performances and interview segments featuring jazz pianist Chick Corea alongside several musical collaborators. Niles served as co-producer, director, and editor of the live film, which accompanied a Grammy-winning album of the same title.

In 2002, Niles directed and edited The Jammy Awards video at the Roseland Ballroom, (Produced by Peter Shapiro). On the stage for an extended jam session (for which the show and awards pay tribute) were: John Mayer, Trey Anastasio (Phish), Bob Weir (Grateful Dead), Mike Gordon (Phish), Gov’t Mule, Stefan Lessard (Dave Matthews Band), Andy Hess (Black Crowes), Derek Trucks, The Allman Brothers and many others.

In 2002 the NHK did a documentary about Niles and the history of HDTV.

In 2003, Niles directed, edited and did the sound mix for “Deacon Johns Jump Blues”, in New Orleans Orpheum Theater, which would go on to win awards for “Best Concert Video” at the 2004 Surround Music Awards, “Variety Performance and Music Video," 2004 Cine Golden Eagle Awards, “Best Concert Video” 2004 Telly Awards and Finalist—“Best DVD-A Mix” 2004 Surround MusicAwards, (Produced by Vetter Communications Corporation).

In 2001, after the tragedy on September 11, he conceived, designed, built and operated “Tribute”, a 39,000-square-foot gallery and exhibit space that was created to celebrate NYC, featuring two 80-seat HD digital cinemas that hosted events for clients including Jaguar, Elton John AIDS Foundation, Warner Brothers, The Wall Street Journal, American Express, Sotheby’s, Cablevision, Apple, and Robert Altman. Tribute was home to Niles film Remember.

In 2002, Niles was made a member of The Academy of Digital Television Pioneers, a select group of 200 individuals who have played a significant role in the decade-long effort that has made digital television a reality for consumers. The DTV Academy includes individuals from the broadcasting, program development, consumer electronics manufacturing and retail industries, as well as present and former government officials and members of the media.

== Kinetic art ==
- 2006 – Radio City Music Hall

Niles was a consultant to Radio City for their first installation of an LED screen on the stage. He also conceived and created all of the content for 2006 holiday show.

- 2008 – present – The Comcast Experience
  David Niles and Niles Creative Group are responsible for the overall concept, complete content production, choice of technology, content delivery system design, fabrication and installation. This project was the first of its kind; visually integrating the 10 million pixel LED screen into the architecture, making it virtually disappear at moments and creating a content delivery system designed with artificial intelligence to create an array of ever-changing imagery. Creating the unexpected using a cast of characters that were ordinary people doing extraordinary things.

=== Awards ===
- 2009 - DSE Content award winner, Niles Creative Group for Content and Content Delivery System, 2009 Archi - Tech AV Award, Niles Creative Group for Outstanding Achievement in Technology Integration, 2009 PRO AV Spotlight Judges' Award, AV Integrator: Niles Creative Group, New York Designer: Niles Creative Group, New York. Niles continues to create all content for the Comcast experience, including the Holiday Show and special shows like Eternally Rome and Falling Water.
- 2009 – 1540 Broadway, NY

Niles and NCG are responsible for the overall concept, complete content production, choice of technology, content delivery system design, fabrication and installation.

- 2010 – (opened in 2014) – The show "The People" The George W. Bush Presidential Center (Freedom Hall), Dallas, Texas

Niles was commissioned in 2010 by The GWB Foundation to create an artistic centerpiece for the George W. Bush Presidential Center in Freedom Hall. The 360-degree show, The People, is a permanent installation in Freedom Hall at the Center. The experience begins as people gather in Freedom Hall, surrounded by what appears to be a 360-degree 200×21-foot painted mural wrapping around all four walls of the 50×50-foot room. It then transforms into a 360-degree time lapse, living landscapes and evolves into a tapestry of the land, its people and the Capitol; set to an original composition performed by a 65-piece orchestra. The finale incorporates a surprise that makes the viewer part of the experience. David Niles and Niles Creative Group were responsible for the overall concept, complete content and music production, choice of technology, content delivery system design, fabrication and installation. Niles also produced other pieces in the center.

- DSE Gold Content Award to Niles Creative Group recognized for its originality in content application tailored specifically for DOOH audiences in the Arts & Entertainment category
- 2014 DSE APEX Award (Silver) Arts, Entertainment and Recreation.
- 2009 - Niles created a 3D holiday show for Comcast at The Comcast Center in Philadelphia.
- 2010 - The China Pavilion "Under One Roof, Shanghai Expo 2010
  Niles and Niles Creative Group were responsible for the overall concept, complete content production, choice of technology, content delivery system design, fabrication and installation and lighting design.
- 2010 - Alexandria Center For Life Science, NY, NY
  Niles and Niles Creative Group were responsible for the overall concept, complete content production, choice of technology, content delivery system design, fabrication and installation.
- 2010 - Lights of Liberty "Liberty "360" Show, Philadelphia, PA
  Niles and Niles Creative Group were responsible for the overall concept, complete content production, choice of technology, content delivery system design, fabrication and installation, sound design.
- 2010-2013 – New York Stock Exchange (NYSE), NY
- 2014–present - The Gateway At City Center DC, Washington DC.
  Niles designed the 25-foot-high, 50-foot-wide video art installation at CityCenterDC entitled The Gateway at CityCenter.

Niles and Niles Creative Group were responsible for the overall concept, complete content and music production, choice of technology, content delivery system design, fabrication and installation.

- 2014 - Longwood Center, Boston MA

Niles and Niles Creative Group were responsible for the overall concept, complete content production, choice of technology, content delivery system design, fabrication and installation

- 2014 - BAIN Capital headquarters, Boston, MA

Niles and Niles Creative Group were responsible for the overall concept, complete content production, choice of technology, content delivery system design, fabrication and installation.

- 2015 - JALC Jazz at Lincoln Center<vr>

Niles was commissioned as a visual artist to create a piece with musician Wynton Marsalis, for a new 26 ft LED wall in Fredrick P. Rose Hall.

- 2015 - The Commons on the Champa, Denver, CO

Comcast provided a digital art installation designed by Niles. The installation creates a visually tactile, futuristic experience with a 270-degree LED display and luminous corridors.

- 2015 - Eternally Rome - a special show for The Comcast Experience
  Niles is the Director, writer, producer, DP, editor and was co-composer and did the music mix. This piece has an original score and was recorded with a live orchestra. Niles and NCG went to Rome for 2 weeks to shoot super high-resolution images for the piece which was commissioned for the Pope's visit to Philadelphia, PA.
- 2015 - "American Snapshot" - a special show for The Comcast Experience
- 2015 - 181 West Madison, Chicago, IL

Niles and Niles Creative Group were responsible for overall concept, complete content production, choice of technology, content delivery system design, fabrication & installation.

- 2016 - OUE US Bank Tower, Los Angeles, CA

Niles and Niles Creative Group were responsible for overall concept, complete content production, choice of technology, content delivery system design, fabrication and installation. (screen installation was done by AG Light & Sound). Niles designed a curved 127-foot by 17-foot LED screen composed of 1,248 custom, high-resolution 4.5 mm pixel pitch tiles, featuring a pixel resolution of 8500 × 1440 (more than 12.2 million pixels). Imagery is so clear and precise that it often appears three-dimensional (screen made by Barco and SiliconCore Technologies). The content by Niles features 4K, 6K and 8K video content depicting LA history and cultural vignettes with a wink and a nod to old Hollywood and architectural details from LA's past.

- 2016 - OUE Skyspace, Los Angeles, CA
- 2016 - 1800 K Street, Washington DC - Lobby interior art and exterior art

Niles was commissioned as an artist - content concepts and content production

- 2017 (not open yet) – One Arts Plaza, Dallas, TX
  Niles was commissioned as an artist - content concepts and content production.
