= Dream Lover (disambiguation) =

"Dream Lover" is a 1959 song by Bobby Darin.

Dream Lover(s) may also refer to:

== Film, television, and theater ==
- Dream Lover (1986 film), an American thriller directed by Alan J. Pakula
- Dream Lover (1993 film), an American erotic thriller directed by Nicholas Kazan
- Dream Lover (1995 film), a Hong Kong film co-produced by Sharla Cheung
- Dream Lovers, a 1986 Hong Kong film directed by Tony Au
- "Dream Lover" (Doctors), a 2005 television episode
- "Dream Lover" (Roseanne), a 1990 television episode
- "Dream Lover" (The Twilight Zone), a 2002 television episode
- "The Dream Lover" (The O.C.), a 2007 television episode
- Dream Lover: The Bobby Darin Musical, a 2016 Australian jukebox musical

== Music ==
=== Performers and albums ===
- Dreamlovers (band), a Belgian pop group
- The Dreamlovers, an American doo wop group
- Dreamlovers (album), by Tanya Tucker, 1980

=== Songs ===
- "Dreamlover", by Mariah Carey, 1993
- "Dream Lover" (The Vaccines song), 2015
- "Dreams" (The Cranberries song), 1992; covered as "Dream Lover" by Faye Wong, 1994
- "Dream Lover", written by Victor Schertzinger and Clifford Grey, 1929
- "Dream Lover", by the Marshall Tucker Band from Together Forever, 1978
- "Dream Lover", by the Jesus and Mary Chain from Munki, 1998

== Other uses ==
- The Dream Lover (short story collection), a 2008 book by William Boyd
