= Ed Sullivan Theater =

Television studio in Manhattan, New York

- Hammerstein's Theatre; Manhattan Theatre; Billy Rose's Music Hall; CBS Radio Playhouse No. 3; CBS Studio 50
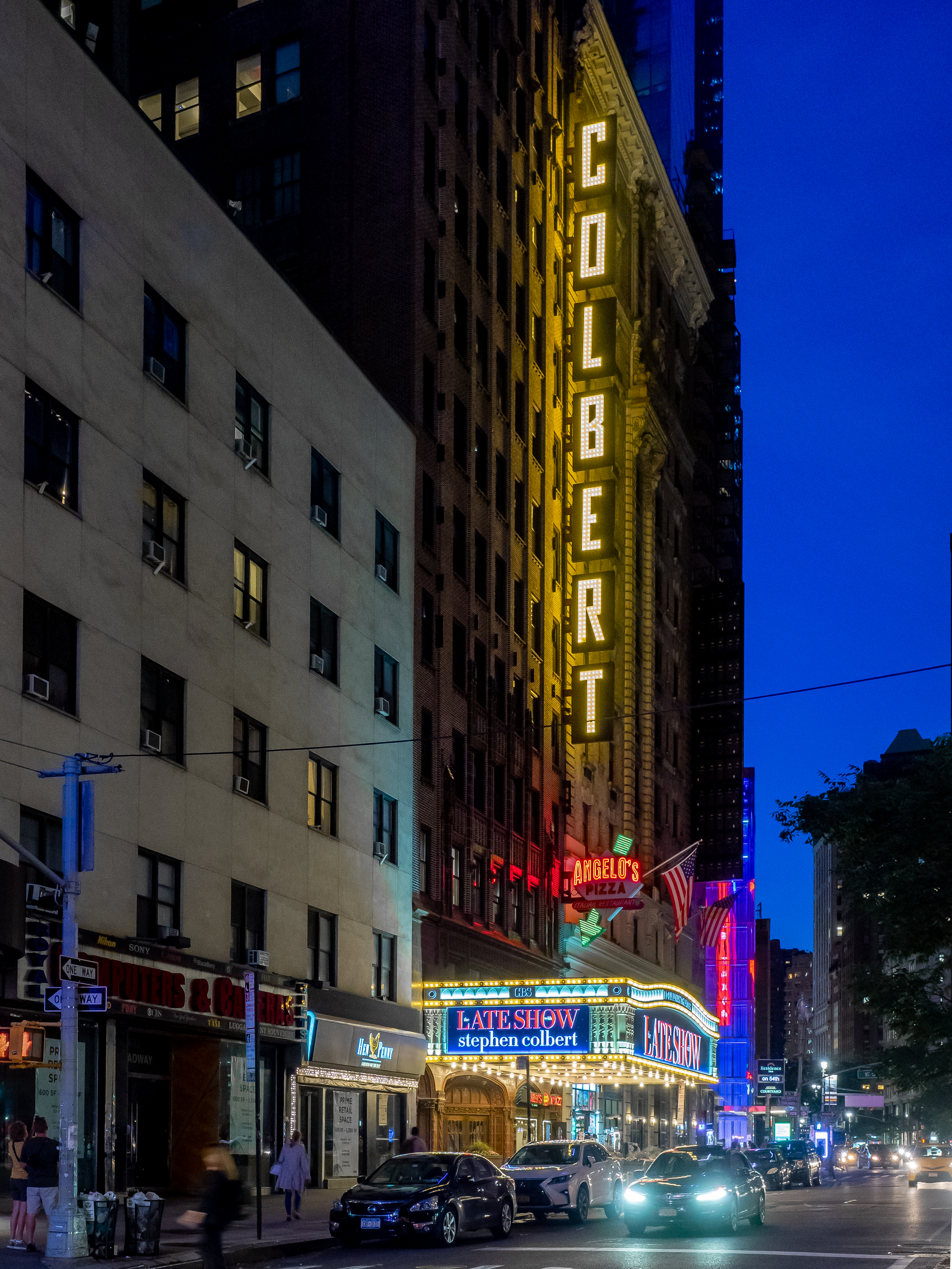
- The Ed Sullivan Theater with The Late Show with Stephen Colbert marquee
- Interactive map of Ed Sullivan Theater
- Former names: Hammerstein's Theater (1927–1935); CBS Studio 50 (1936–1967)
- Address: 1697 Broadway; Manhattan, New York; United States
- Coordinates: 40°45′49.8″N 73°58′58″W
- Owner: Skydance Corporation
- Capacity: 457
- Type: Television studio (Former broadway)
- Current use: Television studio
- Production: The Ed Sullivan Show (1953–1971); The Merv Griffin Show (1969–1970); Saturday Night Live with Howard Cosell (1975–1976); Late Show with David Letterman (1993–2015); The Late Show with Stephen Colbert (2015–2026)

Construction
- Opened: November 30, 1927; 98 years ago
- Closed: 1935 (as Hammerstein's Theater)
- Reopened: 1936 (as CBS Studio 50) 1968 (Ed Sullivan Theater)
- Rebuilt: 1936 (CBS Studio 50); 1968 (Ed Sullivan Theater); 2015 (Restored for Colbert Show)
- Years active: 1927–1936 (Broadway theater); 1936–2026 (Radio and television studio)
- Architect: Herbert Krapp
- Builders: Arthur Hammerstein & Herbert Krapp

Tenant
- The Late Show

U.S. National Register of Historic Places
- Designated: November 17, 1997
- Reference no.: 97001303
- Designated entity: Theater

New York State Register of Historic Places
- Designated: September 23, 1997
- Reference no.: 06101.007023
- Designated entity: Theater

New York City Landmark
- Designated: January 5, 1988
- Reference no.: 1381
- Designated entity: Lobbies and auditorium interiors

The Ed Sullivan Theater (originally Hammerstein's Theatre; later the Manhattan Theatre, Billy Rose's Music Hall, CBS Radio Playhouse No. 3, and CBS Studio 50) is a theater at 1697–1699 Broadway, between 53rd and 54th streets, in the Theater District of Midtown Manhattan in New York City, U.S. Built from 1926 to 1927 as a Broadway theater, the Sullivan was developed by Arthur Hammerstein in memory of his father, Oscar Hammerstein I. The two-level theater was designed by Herbert J. Krapp with over 1,500 seats, though the modern Ed Sullivan Theater was downsized to 370 seats by 2015. The neo-Gothic interior is a New York City designated landmark, and the building is on the National Register of Historic Places.

The Ed Sullivan Theater was built in conjunction with a 13-story Gothic-style office building facing Broadway. An entrance vestibule and two lobbies lead from the main entrance on Broadway to the auditorium on 53rd Street. The auditorium was purposely designed to resemble a cathedral, unlike other structures that were designed as Broadway theaters. It has a domed ceiling with ribs, as well as walls with stained glass. Though the seating arrangement and stage have been heavily modified from their original design, many of the design elements in the lobbies and auditorium are intact.

Hammerstein operated the theater from 1927 to 1931, when he lost it to foreclosure. For the next five years, the theater was leased to multiple operators as both a theater and a music hall. The theater became a venue for CBS radio broadcasts in 1936, and it was converted to TV broadcasting in 1950. Under the Studio 50 name, the theater housed The Ed Sullivan Show from 1953 to 1971, as well as other shows such as The Garry Moore Show and The Jackie Gleason Show. Studio 50 was renamed after Ed Sullivan in 1967, and Reeves Entertainment used the Sullivan in the 1980s as a broadcast facility. The Sullivan staged CBS's The Late Show franchise from 1993 to 2026, first under David Letterman, then under Stephen Colbert from 2015 to 2026. After The Late Show was canceled, the series aired its final broadcast from the Ed Sullivan Theater on May 21, 2026, leaving the venue vacant.

== Site ==
The Ed Sullivan Theater is at 1697 Broadway, in the Theater District of Midtown Manhattan in New York City, U.S. It is on the west side of Broadway between 53rd and 54th streets. The theater building's site is approximately L-shaped and covers 17,527 square feet (1,628.3 m^{2}). The site has a frontage of about 50.3 feet (15.3 m) on Broadway and 150 feet (46 m) on 53rd Street. The theater building wraps around—filling in the "L"—two commercial structures of five stories each, and the surrounding area typically contains hotels and commercial buildings. Nearby locations include Studio 54 to the northwest, 1717 Broadway to the north, 810 Seventh Avenue to the southeast, the Broadway Theatre to the south, and the August Wilson Theatre to the southwest.

== Design ==
The Ed Sullivan Theater was designed by architect Herbert J. Krapp and built by Arthur Hammerstein between 1926 and 1927. The theater building consists of two major portions: a 13-story office tower on the narrow Broadway frontage, as well as the auditorium at the rear on 53rd Street. This layout was necessary because New York City building regulations of the 1920s prohibited developers from constructing offices above theaters.

=== Facade ===
The building has a facade made of brown brick and terracotta. The Broadway elevation of the facade contains the theater entrance and offices, and it is largely designed with Gothic-style glazed terracotta trim. The ground story is elaborately decorated with glazed terracotta blocks. The center of the ground story contains the theater entrance, which has four pairs of recessed bronze-and-glass doors. There is a modern marquee above the entrance, which since 2015 has advertised The Late Show with Stephen Colbert. To the south of the theater entrance is a pointed arch leading to the office lobby. To the north is a pointed arch and a storefront with twisted colonettes. As of 2015, Angelo's Pizza occupied the storefront to the north.

The remainder of the Broadway elevation is relatively simple in design. On Broadway, the windows are divided by brick piers into seven bays. There is Gothic ornamentation on the second through fifth floors and atop the facade.

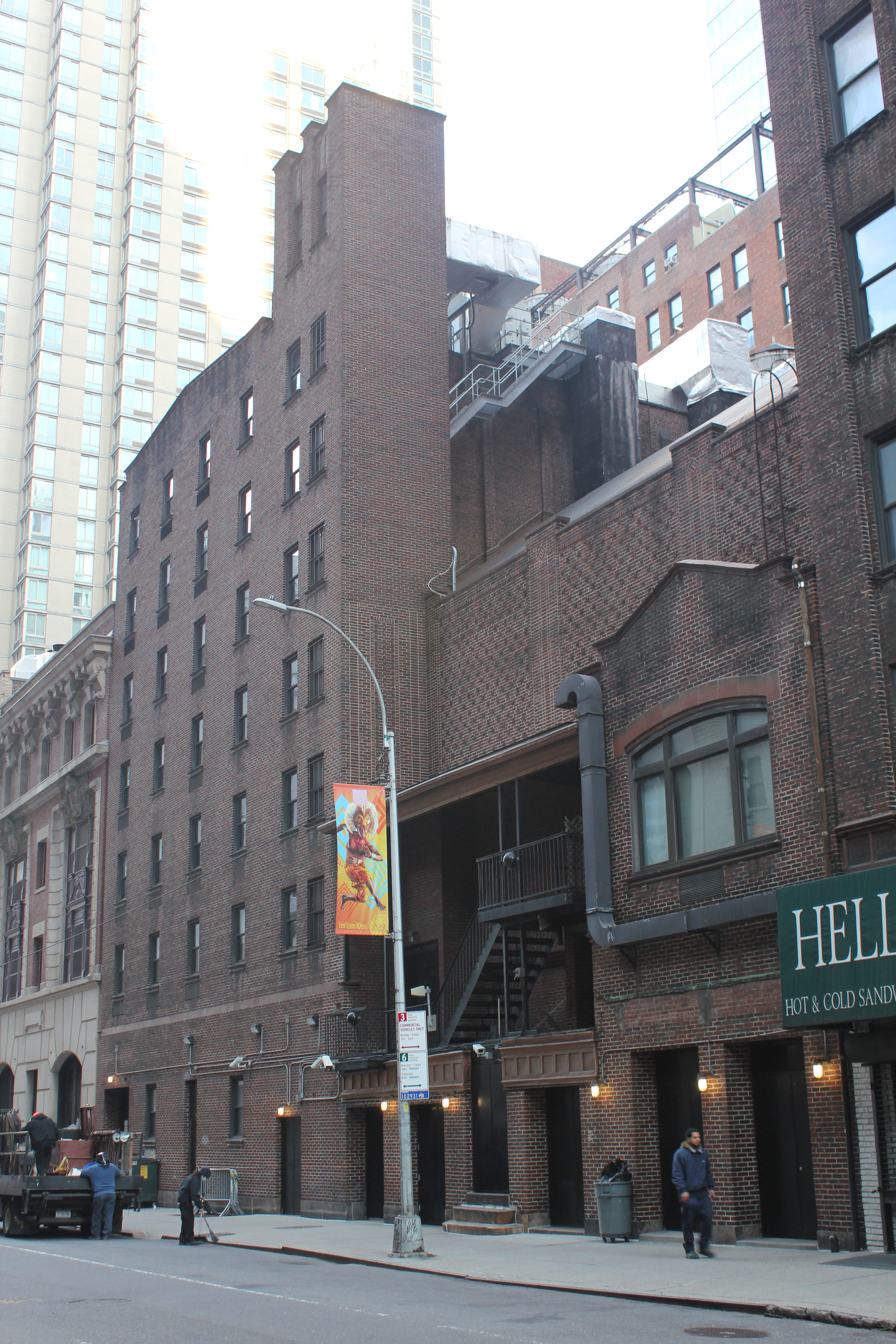
Western portion of the facade's 53rd Street elevation

The 53rd Street elevation is divided into three parts from east to west: the office section, the auditorium exit, and a seven-story auditorium facade. The office section to the east is six bays wide and 13 stories high, with the windows on each story being grouped in pairs. The ground story contains a storefront and an entrance to the Ed Sullivan Theater's office lobby, while the top stories contain Gothic ornament. The auditorium exit at the center is three stories high and contains burned stretchers between the red brick. The second story of this section has a fire escape and an arched window. The third story contains a brick pattern with pulled-out bricks, as well as vertical stretchers that are arranged to resemble piers. The auditorium facade at the west is seven stories high, with six window openings on each story. An electrical substation for the New York City Subway exists immediately west of the auditorium.

=== Interior ===
The Ed Sullivan Theater is housed in the western portion of the L-shaped site, along 53rd Street. The neo-Gothic auditorium was purposely designed to resemble a cathedral, uniquely among structures that were designed as Broadway theaters. The theater was equipped with ventilating and heating/cooling systems that were advanced designs for the 1920s. In a report about the Ed Sullivan Theater, the New York City Landmarks Preservation Commission (LPC) could not identify a reason why the theater was designed in the neo-Gothic style as opposed to the more common Adam or neoclassical styles.

The office building lobby has terrazzo-and-marble floors; plaster wall panels with marble wainscoting; a bronze mailbox; a plaster vaulted ceiling. Four elevators lead from the office lobby to the upper floors, and a stair with a cast-iron balustrade also leads up from the office lobby. The office stories were designed with high ceilings and column-free spaces. Each story was originally arranged with a narrow elevator vestibule, which has been replaced on most floors. The office stories were otherwise decorated in a utilitarian fashion. Arthur Hammerstein reportedly kept a bar room in his office. Among the tenants of the office stories are the Mayor's Office of Film, Theatre & Broadcasting, a New York City government agency on the sixth floor.

==== Entrance vestibule and lobbies ====
Generally, the vestibule and lobbies have marble floors, cast-stone wall panels, and cast-iron radiator grilles. The four double doors on Broadway lead west to a small theater vestibule, which is irregular in shape. The floor of the vestibule has marble panels in a rhombus pattern. The vestibule's walls contain baseboards made of veined marble, above which are cast-stone wall panels that are designed to resemble travertine. The walls contain shallow archways. The north wall contains a cast-iron radiator grille in the Gothic style, which is divided by the arches. The west wall has six bronze-and-glass doors leading to the outer lobby. The vestibule contains a Gothic-style vaulted ceiling made of plaster. Foliate corbels support the ribs of the ceiling, while the center of the ceiling contains a flat rectangular panel.

The outer lobby is L-shaped and has Gothic design details. As in the vestibule, the outer lobby's marble floor has a rhombus pattern, while the walls have marble baseboards and cast-stone panels. The north and south walls are each divided into three bays, with pairs of piers projecting from either wall. The center bay of the south wall has a three-sided ticket booth, while the westernmost bay on the south wall leads into the inner lobby of the auditorium. The ticket booth projects outward and contains cusped arches with windows, surrounds with Gothic details, and finials. The north wall has cast-iron radiator grilles as well. The west wall contains metal double doors with Gothic tracery, which lead to a service alley, while the east wall contains doors from the entrance vestibule. The ceiling contains transverse ribs, which rise from columns along the north and south walls, dividing the ceiling into coffers. Within each coffer, there are moldings with foliate decoration, as well as rosette bosses.

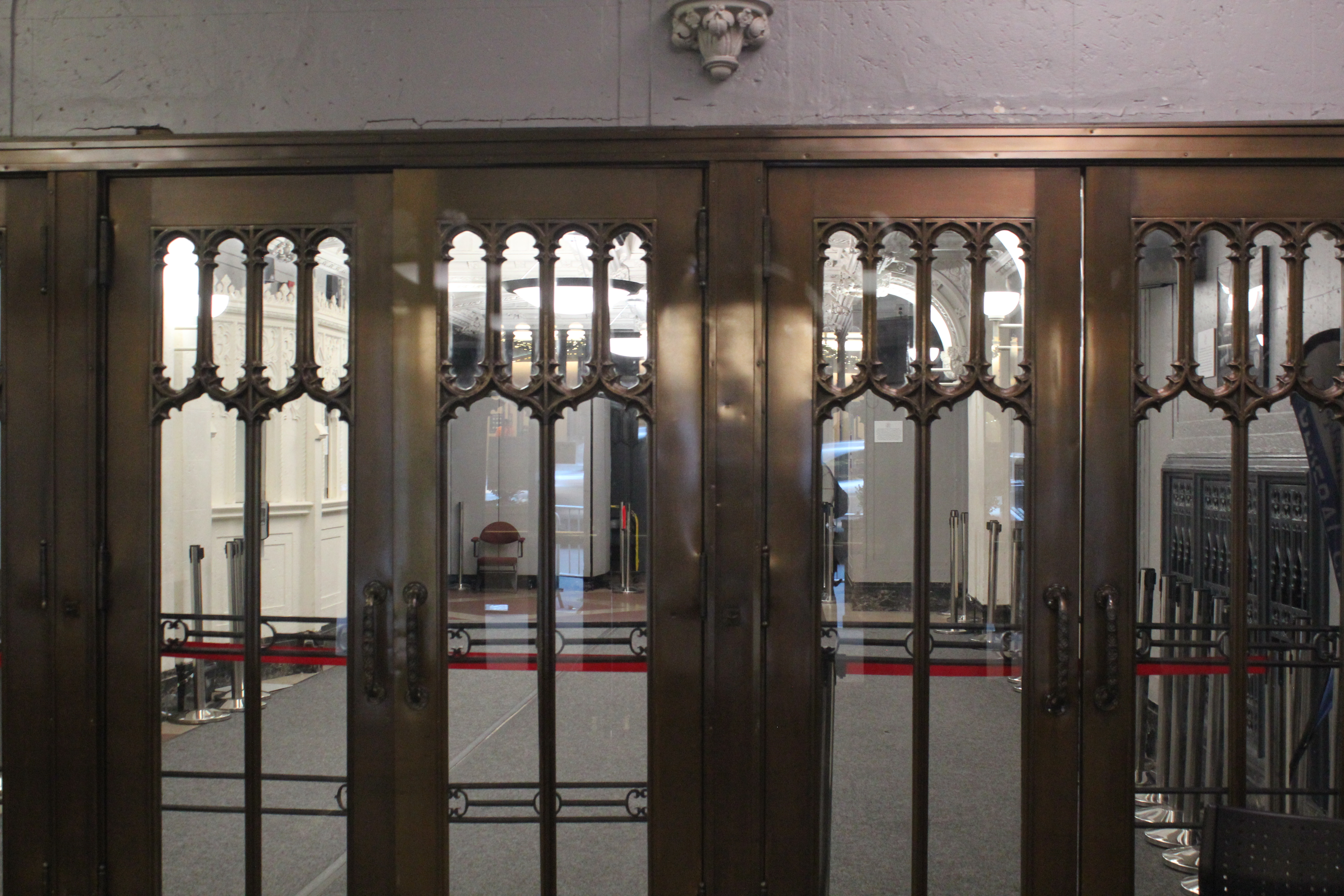
View into entrance vestibule, with outer lobby seen behind the doors

The inner lobby is rectangular and arranged on a north-south axis, approached via the outer lobby on the north. The marble floor is made of a synthetic stone that is designed to resemble rock pavement. The east and west walls are both divided into three bays by projecting shafts, composed of clusters of columns. The center bay of the west wall is slightly recessed and leads to the orchestra level of the auditorium. On either side are staircases ascending to the balcony, with Gothic-style balustrades. The east and south walls, as well as the undersides of the west wall's staircases, contain marble baseboards, wood wainscoting, and cast-stone wall panels. The center bay of the east wall contains Gothic-style tracery that formerly flanked a statue of Arthur Hammerstein's father, Oscar Hammerstein I. The statue was designed by Pompeo Coppini and was made of bronze. The inner lobby has transverse ribs that divide the ceiling into coffers, with foliate-molded ribs that converge at rosette bosses. The coves of the ceilings are decorated with latticework panels.

==== Auditorium ====
The auditorium has an orchestra level, one balcony, and a proscenium arch. The auditorium's width is greater than its depth, and the space is designed with plaster decorations in high relief. Hammerstein's Theatre was originally designed with 1,265 seats. As of 2015, the Ed Sullivan Theater has 370 seats. The Sullivan does not have boxes. The orchestra level was originally raked, but this rake was leveled in subsequent renovations. The auditorium has ten stained glass windows in total, depicting scenes from the elder Hammerstein's opera productions. The stained glass was removed during the run of Late Show with David Letterman (1993–2015), but these were subsequently restored when The Late Show with Stephen Colbert took over.

The rear (west) end of the orchestra contains a promenade, which has wooden wainscoting with heraldic shields, as well as cast-stone walls. Clustered columns divide the promenade wall into three bays with Gothic arches. The rear of the orchestra also contains a Gothic-style rail. The side walls of the orchestra contain floating corbels just below the balcony, which divide each wall into four bays. The underside of the balcony contains Gothic-style moldings, including ribs with foliate decoration and ceiling panels that resemble webs. The balcony level is divided into front and rear sections by an aisle halfway across its depth, which contains Gothic railings. The walls are divided into bays by clustered columns, which are topped by capitals with foliate decoration. The outermost bays have exits within pointed archways, while the center bays had stained glass windows inside pointed arches.

There are four-story-tall openings near the front of the orchestra, which resemble apsidal recesses with stained glass windows in them. Near the front of the orchestra, the walls curve inward toward an elliptical proscenium arch. The archway is flanked by Gothic arches with tracery, as well as clustered columns. The capitals of the columns contain foliate decoration and serve as the imposts of the arch. There is a decorated concave panel on the arch itself.

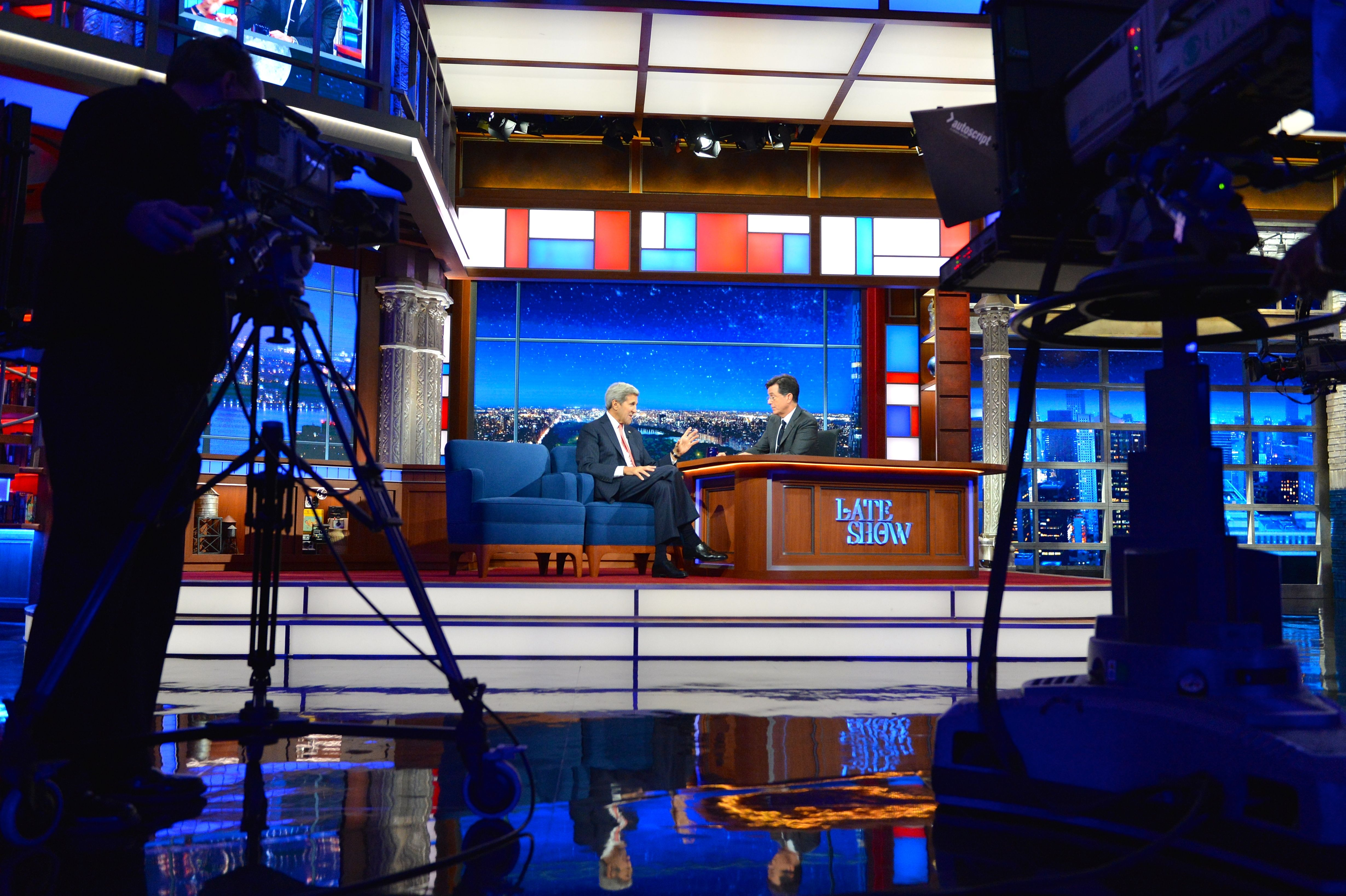
The Late Show with Stephen Colbert stage, with Stephen Colbert interviewing U.S. Secretary of State John Kerry in 2015

The stage is in front of the arch. The original stage had hydraulic equipment that could lift sets from the basement. Installed beneath the stage are heavy-duty "elephant columns", installed in the 1950s to support the weight of Ringling Brothers Circus elephants that visited the theater. The orchestra pit in front of the stage could seat 50 musicians and could descend into the basement; the pit also had a theatrical organ. After a 2015 renovation, the auditorium contained a stage that projected into the seating areas. Raised two steps above the stage, left of center, was a desk area used by Stephen Colbert, host of The Late Show with Stephen Colbert. Colbert had a curved, reddish wood desk, with shelves to allow him to pull props from under the desk area, as well as a monitor in the desktop. The set also contained balconies above the stage area. Louis Cato and the Late Show Band, the show's in-house band, had their own area on the stage next to Colbert.

The ceiling contains a dome with 30 ribs, which intersect above the center of the auditorium. Each rib contains molded foliate decorations as well as bosses. Midway up the ribs, there is a set of ten latticework grilles between the ribs. A lantern hangs from the center of the ceiling. The five-story dome was covered by ceiling panels when Letterman hosted The Late Show, but they were uncovered in 2015 during Colbert's tenure.

== Use as Broadway theater ==
Times Square became the epicenter for large-scale theater productions between 1900 and the Great Depression. During the 1900s and 1910s, many theaters in Midtown Manhattan were developed by the Shubert brothers, one of the major theatrical syndicates of the time. The Ed Sullivan Theater in particular was developed by Arthur Hammerstein, son of Oscar Hammerstein I, who went to form his own theatrical career in 1910. After Oscar died in 1919, Arthur started negotiating with Lee Shubert, one of the Shubert brothers, to develop a theater in Oscar's honor. Arthur proposed naming what is now the Imperial Theatre after his father. While Shubert rejected the proposal, the Imperial did host two Hammerstein works in its early years. One of those, Rose-Marie, grossed enough to fund a dedicated memorial theater for Oscar Hammerstein I, which was to cost $3 million.

=== Development and early years ===
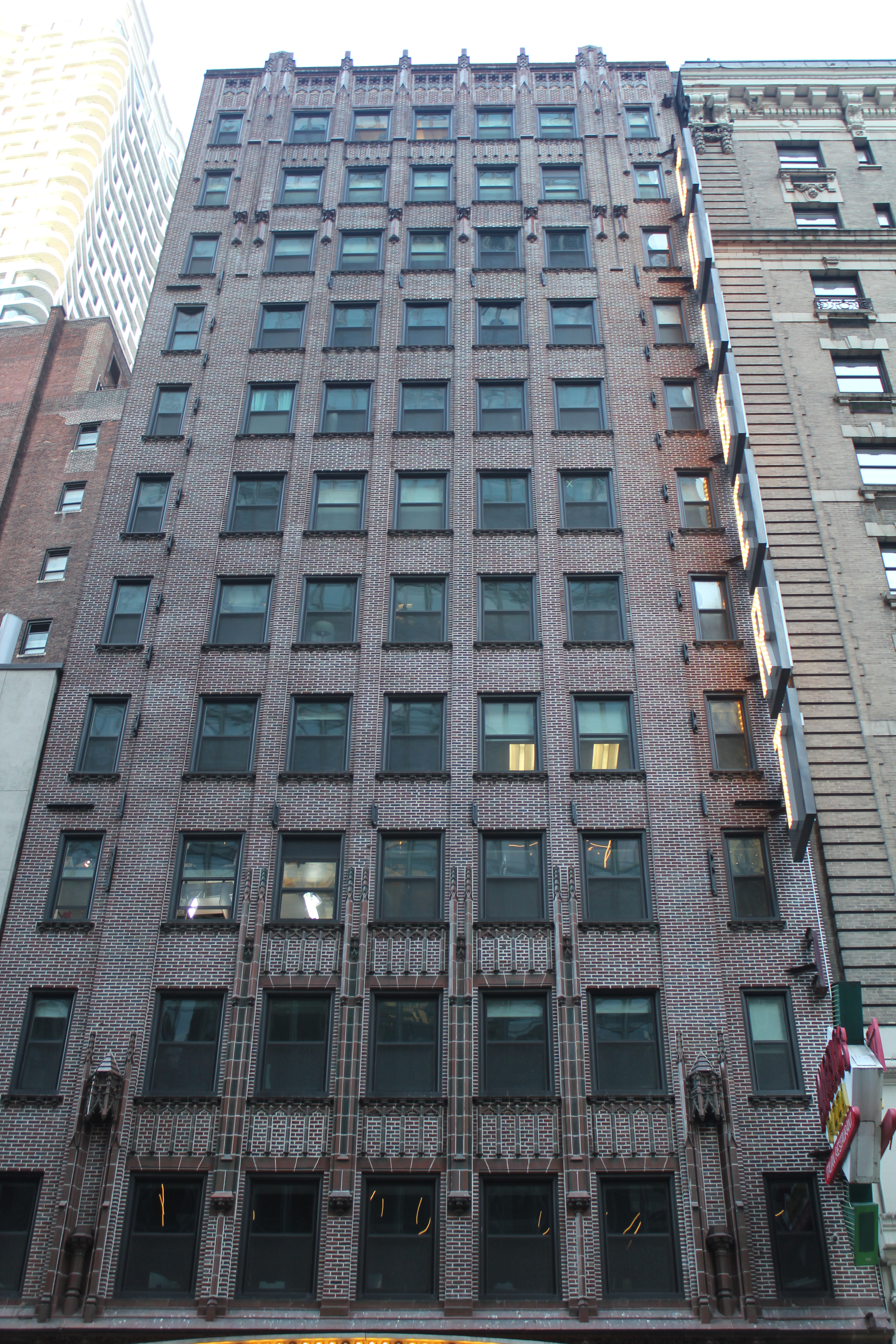
Detail of upper-story facade

In 1926, Arthur Hammerstein paid $1.5 million (equal to $218 million in 2025) for several land lots at 1697 Broadway and 213–223 West 53rd Street, near the northwest corner of these two streets. That May, Hammerstein announced plans for a "Temple of Music" in memory of his father, to be designed by Herbert Krapp in the Gothic style. In October 1926, Variety reported that Arthur planned to leave a covenant in his will, prohibiting the theater from being renamed while it was standing. The following January, Hammerstein hired Emmerich Kálmán to write the musical Golden Dawn, to be played at the theater's opening, with soprano Louise Hunter as a featured performer. The theater's name was shortened to "Hammerstein's Theatre" in March 1927 because the words "Temple of Music" could not fit on playbills. Work officially began on March 21, 1927. A cornerstone-laying ceremony was held on September 30, where mayor Jimmy Walker made a speech praising the Hammersteins. The Broadway Association donated a bronze tablet, and mementos of Oscar Hammerstein, including a silk top hat and a cigar, were placed into the cornerstone.

Hammerstein's Theatre was formally dedicated on November 30, 1927. The first production at the theater was Golden Dawn, which featured the American debut of Cary Grant (then known by his birth name, Archie Leach) as well as the first topless woman in a stage production in the U.S. The artist Joseph Cummings Chase designed 11 portraits of Golden Dawn's cast members, which were hung in the lobby for the dedication. The theater was lavishly decorated with materials such as Czechoslovak rugs, gold-colored mosaics, and stained glass. New York Daily News critic Burns Mantle likened Hammerstein's to "a vaulted temple in free Gothic", while New York Daily Mirror critic Robert Coleman said the theater was "just such a playhouse as the father of American grand opera would have loved". Less successful was Golden Dawn, which ultimately lost money, even though it ran 184 performances into May 1928.

After the end of Golden Dawn's run, Arthur Hammerstein announced he would screen the Soviet film The Last of St. Petersburg at the theater, though approval of that film was delayed slightly by New York state censors. The next production to play at Hammerstein's was Good Boy, which opened in September 1928 and ran 253 performances through April 1929. Hammerstein's third production was Sweet Adeline, which opened in September 1929, weeks before the Wall Street Crash of 1929. Even so, Sweet Adeline managed 235 performances before it closed in March 1930. By then, Arthur Hammerstein had lost his wealth during the financial crisis, and he hoped to recover some of his losses by staging a hit. Another issue was the fact that the office wing was not profitable because an elevated railroad line ran nearby. The remainder of 1930 brought two major flops: Luana, which closed after 16 performances in September and October, and Ballyhoo, which ran 68 performances from December 1930 to February 1931.

=== Hammerstein's bankruptcy ===
In February 1931, the Manufacturers Trust Company moved to foreclose on about $1.3 million (equal to $22 million in 2025) in mortgage loans on the theater. The next month, Arthur Hammerstein filed for bankruptcy, saying that he had just $5.77 to his name (equal to $122 in 2025), having lost $2 million in the preceding years (equal to $34 million in 2025). Hammerstein had to give up the theater to satisfy the outstanding mortgage; he blamed his misfortune on Luana and Ballyhoo, as well as the decline in musical comedy. Hammerstein's bankruptcy filings described the theater and office building as the "milestone" in his bankruptcy, without which he would have still been fairly wealthy. Manufacturers Trust foreclosed on the property at an April 1931 auction, and the bank tried to sell the building unsuccessfully. Ultimately, Laurence Schwab and Frank Mandel leased the theater for their musical shows that June, and it was renamed the Manhattan Theatre at a ceremony in August 1931.

Mandel and Schwab removed some glass windows and Oscar Hammerstein's lobby statue and expanded the orchestra pit. The first musical under the new management was Free For All, which opened in September 1931 and ran just 15 performances before closing. A subsequent musical, East Wind, opened in October 1931 and was little more successful, ran 23 performances. The Manhattan staged a third musical, Through the Years, in January 1932; it lasted 20 performances. Schwab and Mandel had terminated their two-year lease by April 1932, ten months after signing the lease. That month, Earl Carroll's brother Norman S. Carroll leased the Manhattan Theatre for five years, intending to show revues there. Earl Carroll had hoped to stage a musical based on the Austin Melford farce It's a Girl. Six months later in October, Norman Carroll had relinquished his own lease on the Manhattan. The theater was again dark for an extended period. Harry Kline took over management in March 1933.

=== Music hall and attempted theatrical revival ===
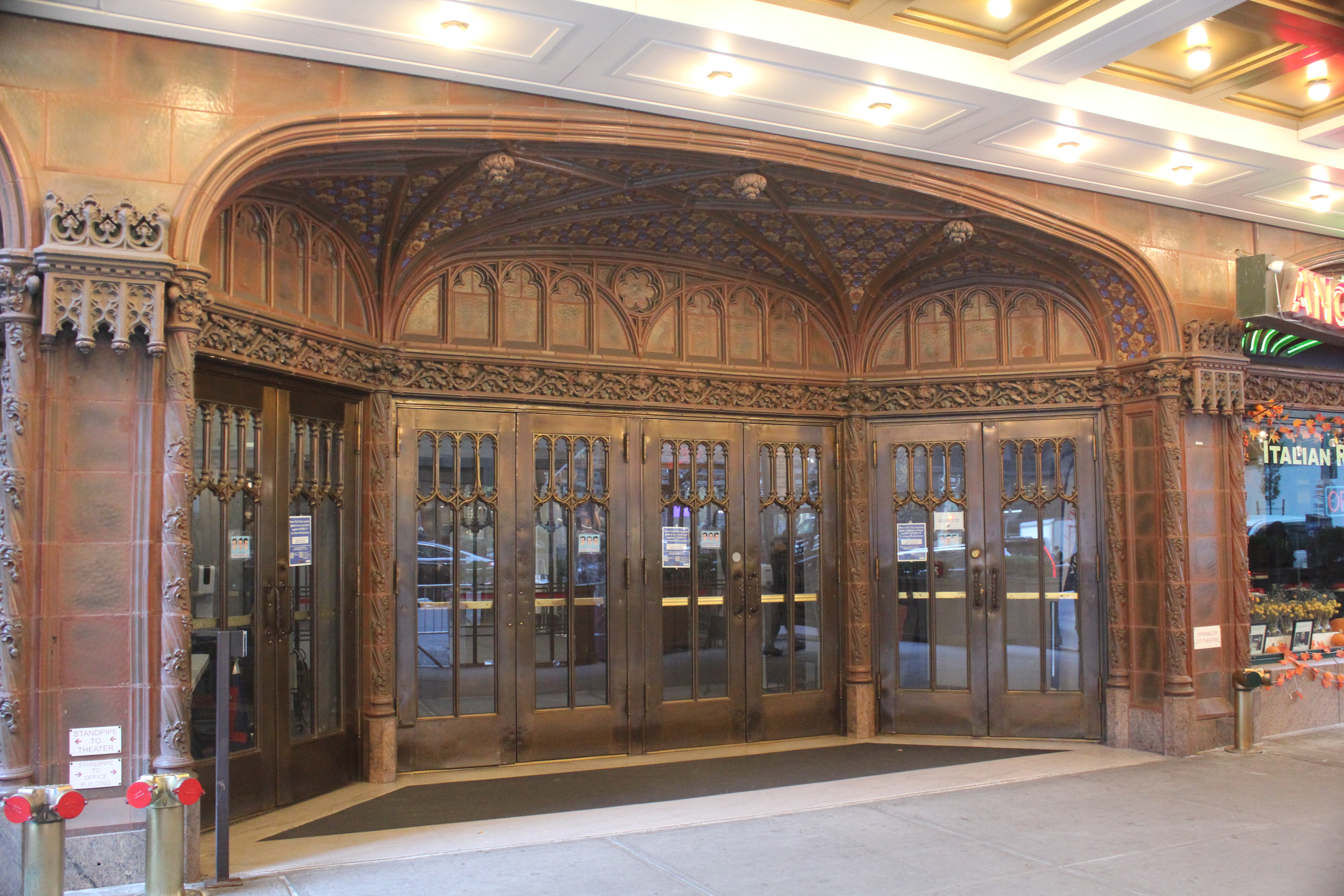
Entrance to the theater

In September 1933, the Stevenson Holding Company leased the Manhattan Theatre for five years from Manufacturers Trust. Stevenson planned to renovate the venue into the Manhattan Casino, a "restaurant and music hall" for 1,500 patrons. The improvements included removing the auditorium's seats and placing tables on the orchestra and balcony level. The orchestra was flattened so movable tables and chairs could be installed. Murals were installed to give the space an old west feeling, and the main floor was equipped with a wishing well. In addition, the space was outfitted with bars in the lobby and the basement lounge. Known tentatively as the Manhattan Casino, the planned music hall was subsequently renamed Billy Rose's Music Hall after Billy Rose signed a lease for the Manhattan Theatre in early 1934. Clark Robinson, who decorated both Radio City Music Hall and Rose's Casino de Paree, designed alterations for the interior, though he kept the overall decorative scheme intact.

Billy Rose's Music Hall opened on June 21, 1934. It was one of three theaters near 54th Street that were converted to nightclubs in the mid-1930s. The hall offered luncheons, dinners, and suppers with entertainment such as newsreels, comedies, a hundred singing waiters, and a hundred "American beauties" who doubled as hostesses. Authentic reenactments of vaudeville were also presented. Initially, the music hall was successful, and Rose decided to travel to Europe for eight weeks to obtain acts for the hall's next season. Within a month of the hall's opening, Rose was forced to fire many of the singing waiters and hostesses due to labor complaints. Mobsters became involved in the hall's operation during Rose's absence, including Lucky Luciano, prompting an investigation that involved J. Edgar Hoover. That September, the New York City government tried to force the music hall to apply for a theatre license because the venue showed short films, even though the hall was technically registered as a cabaret. The same month, Rose withdrew from the hall because of disagreements over pay.

In November 1934, the venue was renamed the Manhattan Music Hall. However, the venue struggled to succeed without Rose's leadership. The Manhattan Music Hall was "temporarily" shuttered in January 1935, and the hall sought to reorganize shortly afterward. After another year of failures, the Manhattan Music Hall closed permanently in January 1936 and the Hammerstein's Theatre space was used by the Works Progress Administration (WPA) under the auspices of the "Popular Price Theater". The first WPA production to be staged at the Manhattan was American Holiday, which opened on February 21, 1936, and ran for a month. This was followed by Murder in the Cathedral in March, Class of '29 in May, and Help Yourself in July 1936. As of 2025, no further theatrical productions have been staged at the theater after Help Yourself closed.

== Use as playhouse ==
=== CBS playhouse ===
==== Radio Theater No. 3 ====
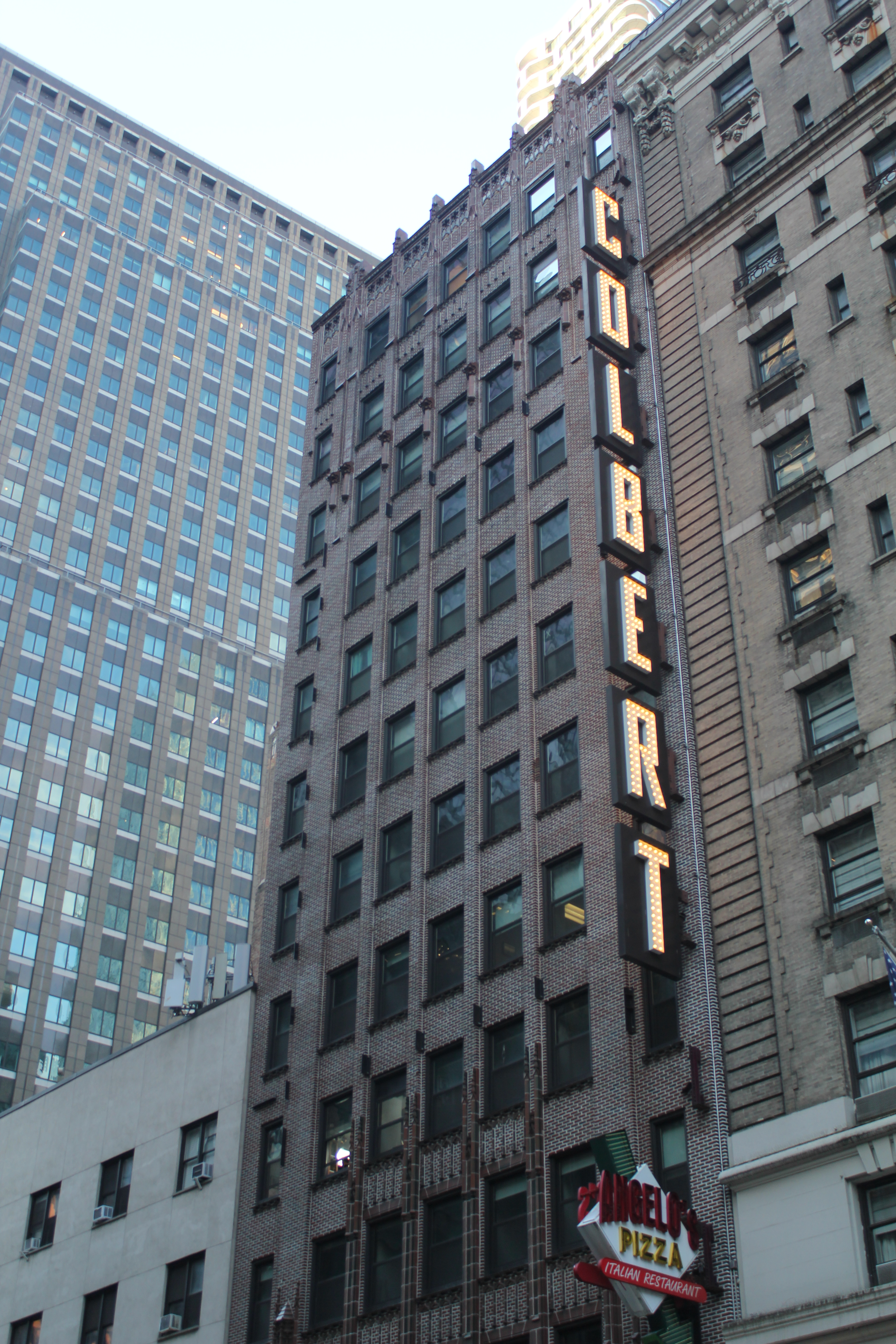
View looking south from Broadway

The Columbia Broadcasting System (CBS) tested the Manhattan Theatre's acoustics in July 1936 to determine whether it was suitable as a broadcast playhouse. The next month, CBS acquired a lease on the theater, relocating there from the Little Theatre. Architect William Lescaze renovated the interior, keeping nearly all of Krapp's design touches, but covering many walls with smooth white panels. The magazine Architectural Forum praised Lescaze's work. CBS engineers also added rock wool on the floors and walls to insulate the auditorium from passing elevated and subway trains, and they added telephone and public-announcement systems. The new playhouse was tentatively known as the CBS Theatre on the Air. These modifications cost $25,000 (equivalent to $580,000 in 2025) and increased the theater's capacity very slightly, to 1,269 seats.

The radio network began broadcasting from the Manhattan in September 1936, moving in broadcast facilities it had leased in the NBC Studios at Rockefeller Center. The debut broadcast was the Major Bowes Amateur Hour. In February 1937, the Manhattan Theatre became CBS Radio Theater No. 3 after the network acquired the Golden Theatre, which was labeled as theater number 1. The theater was subsequently known as the CBS Radio Playhouse. A New York Times reporter wrote in 1943 that the onetime memorial to Oscar Hammerstein was now "another kind of shrine" on Saturday nights. At the time, teenagers often congregated at the playhouse to hear Frank Sinatra. The comedy program The Fred Allen Show was also broadcast at CBS Radio Theater No. 3, as was the wartime variety show Command Performance.

Manufacturers Trust sold the theater and offices in May 1944 to Howard S. Cullman and the Cullman brothers, subject to a mortgage of $400,000 ($6 million in 2025). CBS Radio Theater No. 3 continued to operate within the auditorium and some of the upper stories, and CBS's lease had two years remaining. By December 1945, with CBS's lease about to expire, the network was negotiating to buy the Alvin Theatre. The Cullman brothers intended to return Hammerstein's to theatrical use the following year, presenting musical comedies. Theatre Incorporated expressed interest in operating Hammerstein's. Ultimately, in June 1946, Cullman and CBS formed an agreement in which CBS could use Hammerstein's for five more years, while Cullman would present productions at the Alvin instead.

==== CBS Studio 50 ====
The onetime Hammerstein's Theatre was converted for television in 1949, and it became CBS-TV Studio 50. The modifications included the addition of camera runways. Shielded television cameras had to be developed due to strong magnetic interference from equipment at a neighboring subway substation. With the conversion of Studio 50 to television use, the auditorium ceiling was painted white. By January 1950, Studio 50 was being used exclusively for television broadcasts and AM radio-television simulcasts. The first TV show to be broadcast from Studio 50 was Arthur Godfrey's Monday prime-time show Arthur Godfrey's Talent Scouts, which had simulcast on radio and TV since December 6, 1948. The next production to air from Studio 50 was The Jackie Gleason Show, which commenced in September 1952. Toast of the Town (later renamed The Ed Sullivan Show), hosted by newspaper columnist and impresario Ed Sullivan, relocated to Studio 50 in January 1953 because its previous quarters at the Maxine Elliott Theatre were too small.

Cullman and CBS decided in 1951 to swap Studio 50 and the Alvin for another three years, allowing Studio 50 to be used for television. When the lease on Studio 50 came due in 1954, CBS extended its lease for another four years. The theater and building were sold in October 1955 to a client of Walter Scott & Co., and the Bowery Savings Bank placed a $600,000 loan on the property ($6 million in 2025). In addition to CBS, the tenants at the time included Fred Waring & the Pennsylvanians and the American Guild of Variety Artists. During the 1950s, the theater also hosted shows such as The Garry Moore Show and The Big Payoff. Additionally, The Stage Show with Tommy and Jimmy Dorsey featured the first national television appearances by rock music icon Elvis Presley.

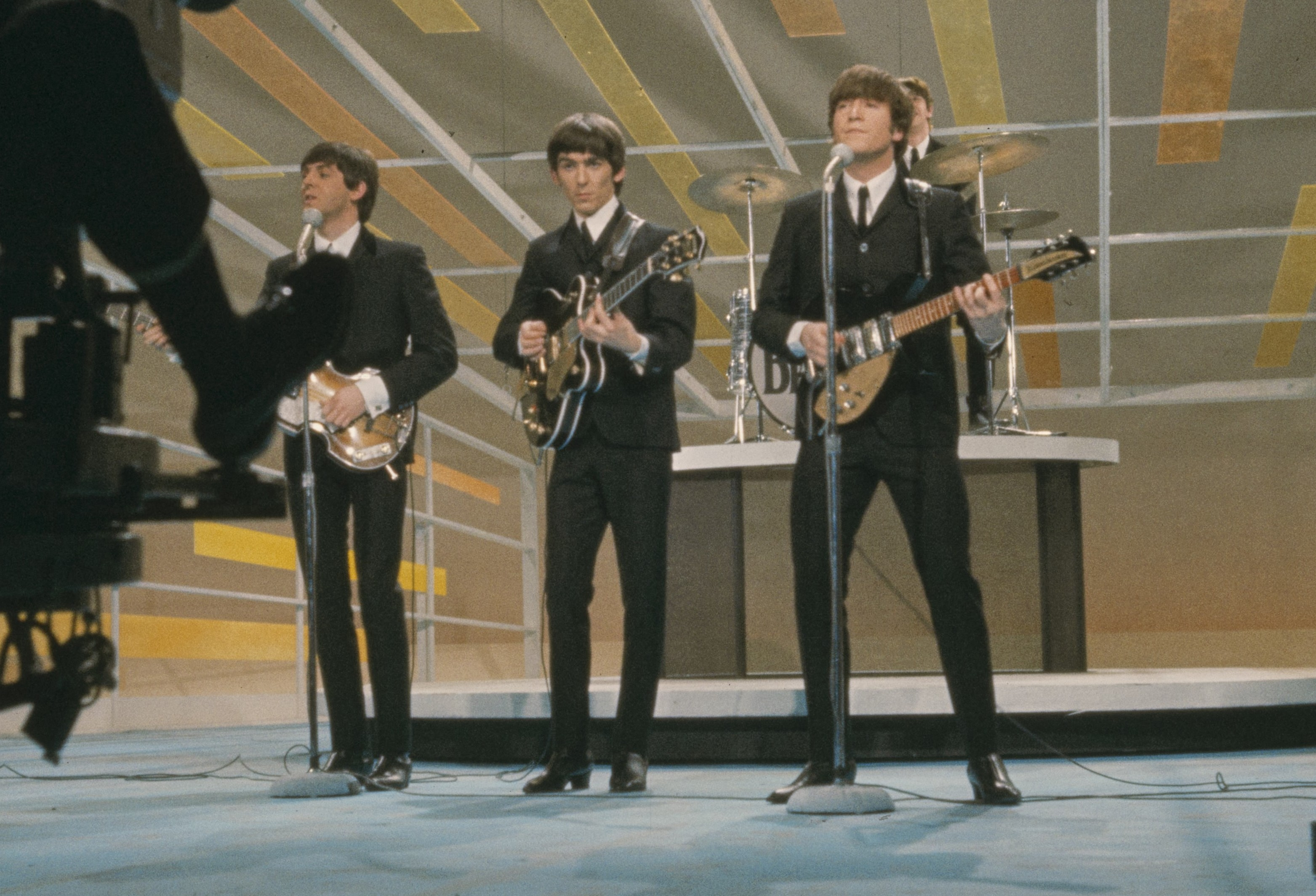
The Beatles performing on The Ed Sullivan Show in 1964

By the early 1960s, Studio 50 and the neighboring Studio 52 were among CBS's busiest stages. Studio 50 was used not only for Sullivan's program but also for The Merv Griffin Show and several game shows. The Ed Sullivan Show hosted numerous events, including The Beatles' debut performance in the United States in 1964, as well as notable and still-beloved performances from Lesley Gore, Tom Jones, Dusty Springfield, the Supremes, the Mamas & the Papas, and the Jackson 5. (Note: See also: "View of a car driving past CBS Television Studio 50 Theatre on Broadway prior to an upcoming performance by The Beatles on The Ed Sullivan Show at the venue, the first appearance by the group in the city, in New York in February 1964". Getty Images. February 1964.) Studio 50 was converted to color in 1965, and the first color episode of The Ed Sullivan Show debuted on October 31 of that year. What's My Line?, To Tell the Truth, and Password also moved to Studio 50 after CBS began broadcasting regularly in color. For Ed Sullivan's 20th anniversary in 1967, CBS announced plans to rename Studio 50 for Sullivan; the theater was officially renamed on December 10, 1967. By the time Ed Sullivan was canceled in 1971, it was the longest-running television show ever.

Line and Truth remained at the Ed Sullivan Theater until 1971, after Ed Sullivan's cancellation, when they were relocated to save money. While the rental was to expire in 1976, CBS was paying $100,000 a year for the Sullivan (equal to $440 thousand in 2025), which no longer had a major tenant. For the next two decades, the Sullivan hosted a multitude of events and broadcasts, including several game shows. The $10,000 Pyramid premiered in 1973 and continued to broadcast there after moving to ABC in 1974. Other short-lived game shows produced at the theater included Musical Chairs with singer Adam Wade (1975), some episodes of the NBC game show Shoot for the Stars with Geoff Edwards (1977), and Pass the Buck with Bill Cullen (1978). In addition, Saturday Night Live with Howard Cosell started broadcasting from the Sullivan in 1975. Overall, however, the Sullivan remained largely empty after the cancellation of The Ed Sullivan Show.

=== Reeves Entertainment ===
By 1980, the Ed Sullivan Theater and its office wing were owned by Bankers Life and Casualty. CBS's lease on the building was set to expire in December 1981, but the network did not seek to renew the lease. The Nederlander Organization and the Shubert Organization both expressed interest in leasing the Ed Sullivan Theater and turning it back into a legitimate Broadway venue. The Shuberts, which were federally prohibited from acquiring more theaters, even petitioned a federal court to lift the restriction, a sign of its interest in the Sullivan. Furthermore, by late 1981, Bankers Life announced that it would also sell the Sullivan to avoid tax penalties, since Bankers Life had to divest many of its properties under law.

The Sullivan became Teletape Studios, a facility for Reeves Entertainment, in March 1982. Reeves taped the plays The Country Girl and Morning's at Seven there immediately after buying the theater. The company remodeled the Sullivan with a larger stage measuring 80 by 80 feet (24 by 24 m). The dressing rooms were also refurbished and new lighting and soundproofing were installed. Under Reeves's management, the Sullivan hosted the sitcom Kate & Allie from 1984 to 1989. It also hosted tapings of some Merv Griffin Show episodes, The Great Space Coaster, Doug Henning's World of Magic, the early Nickelodeon talk show Livewire, and a pilot of The Stiller and Meara Show. The theater remained largely empty after Kate & Allie ended.

The New York City Landmarks Preservation Commission (LPC) had started considering protecting the Sullivan as an official city landmark in 1982, with discussions continuing over the next several years. The LPC designated the interior as a landmark in January 1988. This was part of the LPC's wide-ranging effort to grant landmark status to Broadway theaters, which had commenced in 1987. The New York City Board of Estimate ratified the designations in March 1988. David Niles and his company 1125 Productions signed a lease in December 1989 for his HDTV studio and his new Broadway show Dreamtime. Niles recalled that the theater resembled a "bombed-out tenement". The theater was renovated to accommodate HDTV broadcasts, the first of which took place in early 1991 with a taping of the Seattle Opera. An NBC special celebrating Phil Donahue's 25 years on television was taped at the Sullivan in 1992, as well as an MTV "Up Close" interview with Paul McCartney of the Beatles. In addition, NBC News used the theater for election-night coverage of the 1992 United States elections.

=== Late Show use ===
==== Late Show with David Letterman ====
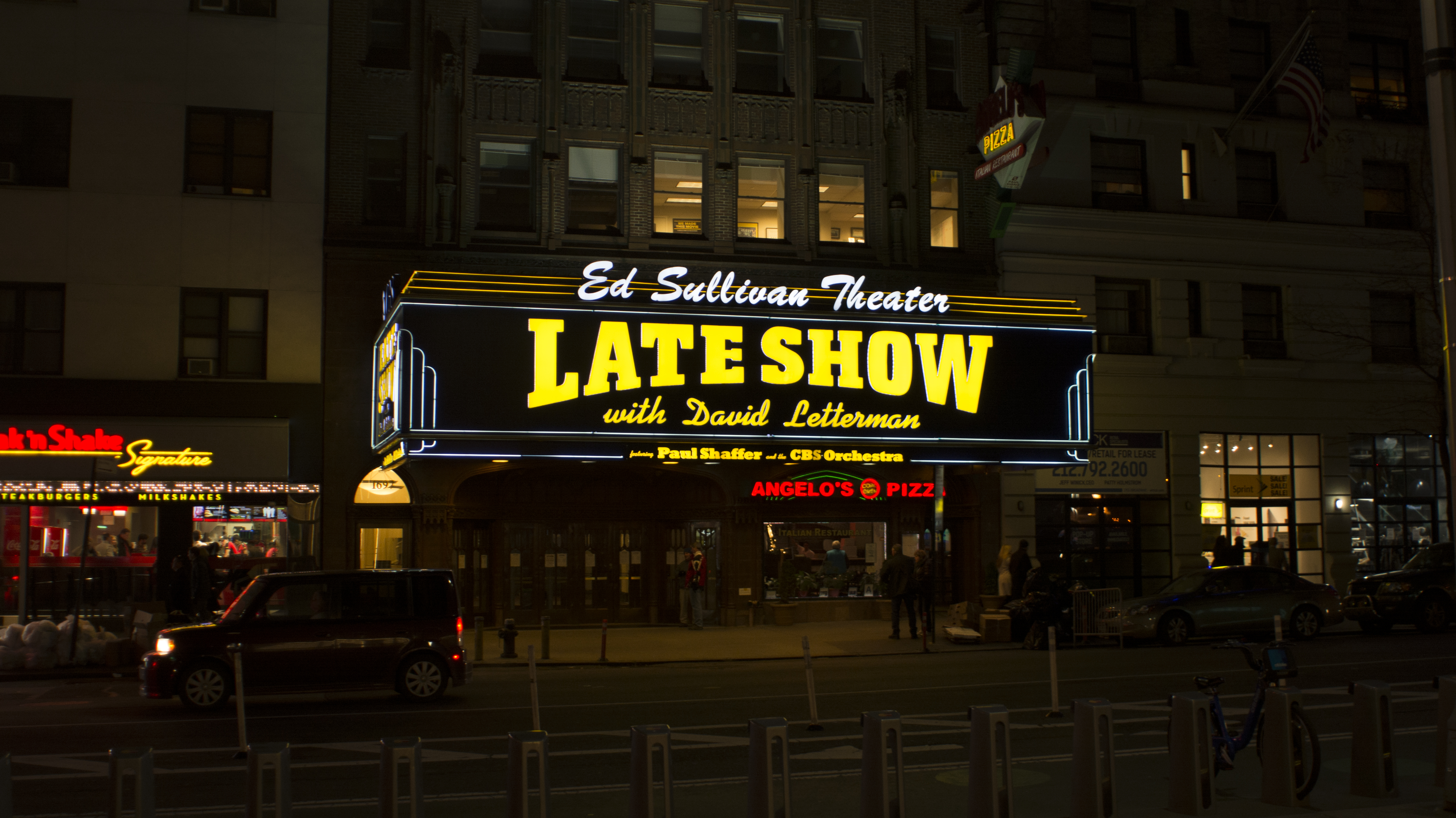
The Ed Sullivan Theater with the Late Show with David Letterman marquee

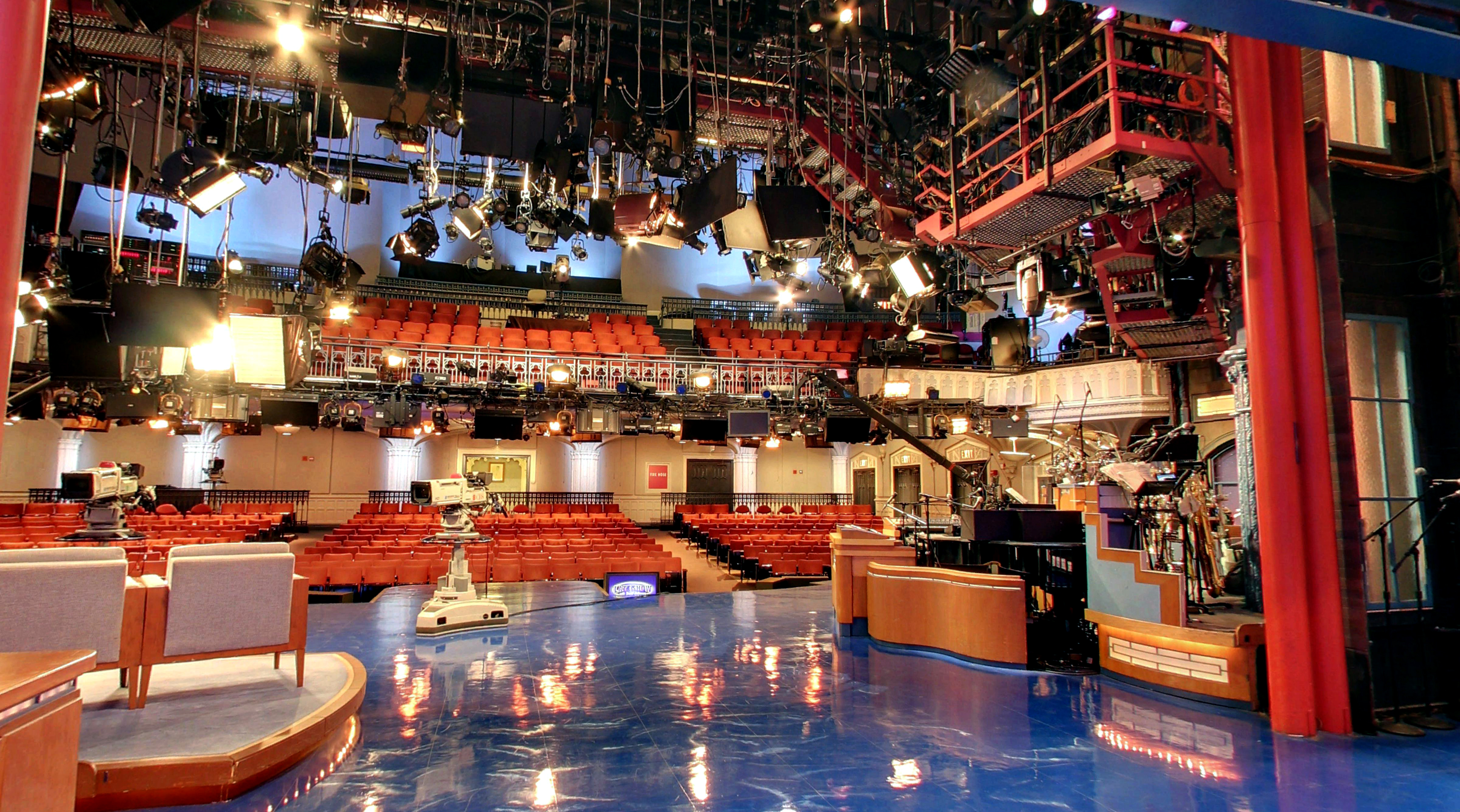
View from proscenium on the set of the Late Show with David Letterman

In January 1993, after David Letterman switched from NBC to CBS, he considered taping his new Late Show with David Letterman in either Los Angeles or New York City. CBS looked at 15 theaters in New York City before buying the Ed Sullivan Theater from Winthrop Financial Associates for $4.5 million in February. Niles's Dreamtime was given four weeks to vacate, but Dreamtime closed instead because of the high cost of relocating. The rapid sale earned its broker the Henry Hart Rice Achievement Award for the Most Ingenious Deal of the Year for 1993. Polshek Partnership was hired to renovate the theater, while HRH Construction managed the project. In addition, Letterman's production company Worldwide Pants was to have its offices in the theater's office building.

Two hundred workers worked for twelve weeks to reconfigure the theater. To speed up approvals for the renovation, Polshek agreed to design all the modifications so they could be reversed later. Five concave sound-insulation shells were hung from an elliptical ring below the dome, concealing air-conditioning systems that kept the temperature at 62 °F (17 °C). Acoustic baffles were installed along the rear of the auditorium to give it an "intimate" feel, and the number of seats was reduced to 400. CBS removed the stained-glass windows and placed them in storage, covering the window openings with acoustic material. Since the existing interior was decayed, much of the existing plasterwork was restored or replaced. Part of the balcony railing was replaced with fiberglass, and a control room from the Ed Sullivan era was also relocated. The cost of the renovation, which was never publicly disclosed, has been estimated at $4 million.

The Late Show premiered at the Ed Sullivan Theater on August 30, 1993. The premiere of the Late Show led to a revitalization of the surrounding neighborhood, but this led to businesses being relocated or displaced due to high rents. For example, CBS evicted McGee's Pub from the Broadway storefront in 1994; the pub was replaced by a Late Show-themed restaurant that closed two years after opening. The Ed Sullivan Theater was listed on the National Register of Historic Places in 1997. CBS began moving HD production equipment into the Sullivan's control room in mid-2003, but a full HD upgrade was delayed due to the layout of the theater. Ultimately, the Sullivan was refitted with cabling and equipment to broadcast HDTV in mid-2005.

==== The Late Show with Stephen Colbert ====
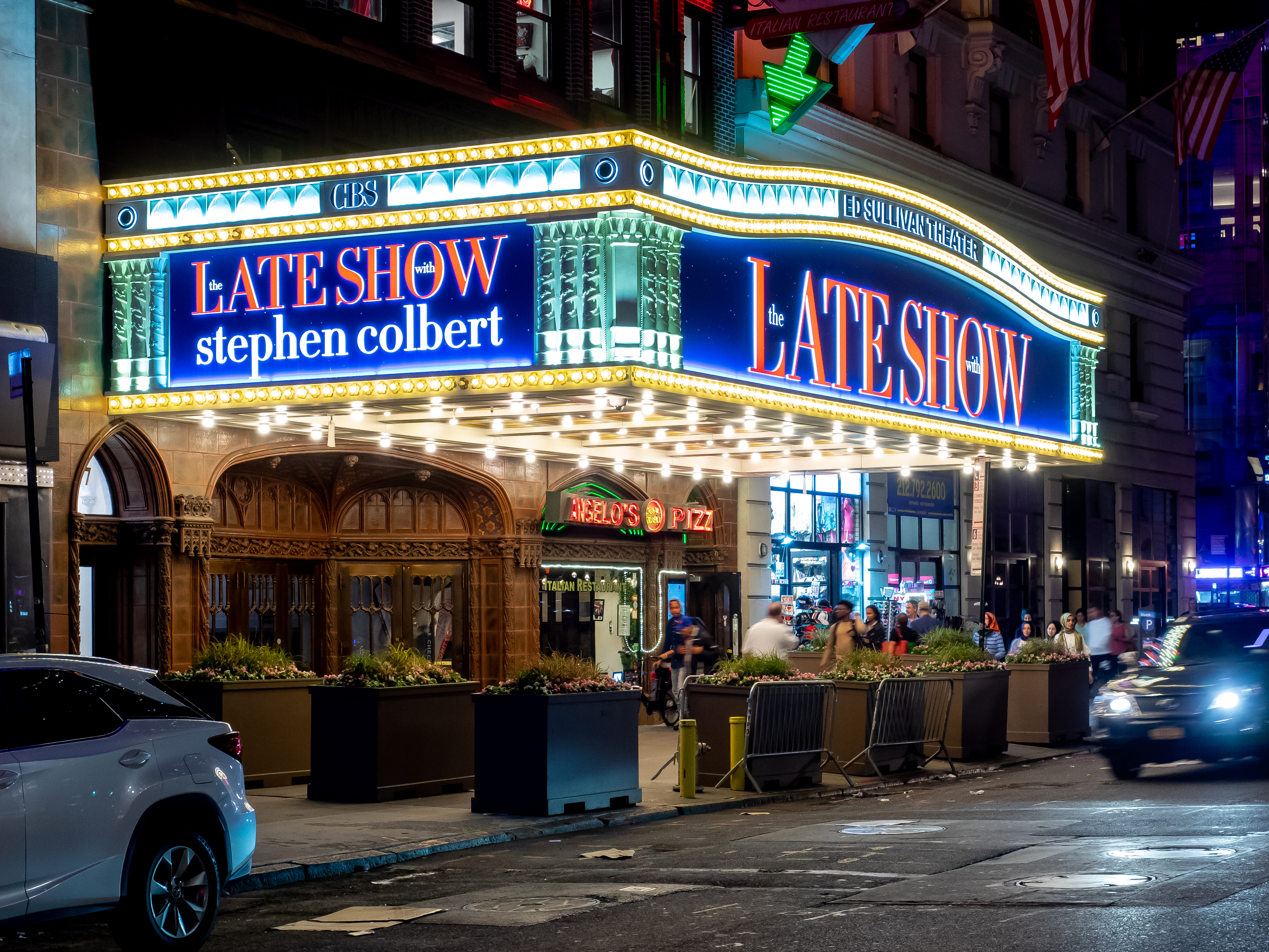
The Ed Sullivan Theater received a new marquee for The Late Show with Stephen Colbert.

In 2014, Letterman announced that he would retire from the Late Show and that Stephen Colbert would succeed him as the show's host. CBS secured $5 million worth of tax breaks from the New York state government, which convinced network executives to keep the show at the Ed Sullivan Theater. Colbert called for the theater's restoration after learning about the auditorium's dome. The Letterman set was removed a week after his last show on May 20, 2015, and Worldwide Pants moved out. Letterman's marquee was also removed and temporarily replaced by a banner promoting the neighboring Angelo's Pizza restaurant, featuring Colbert posing with a slice of pizza. A new Colbert marquee and vertical sign were installed in August 2015. The sign was designed to have a "glitzy" appearance appropriate for Broadway. CBS late-night executive Vincent Favale joked that 30 Rockefeller Plaza's rear marquee (for The Tonight Show Starring Jimmy Fallon) looked like a mall kiosk in comparison.

The auditorium was gutted during renovations. The theater's dome, which had been covered up by air ducts and sound buffers, was uncovered; Colbert recalled that restorers found objects such as old tools, traffic citations, and cigars from the mid-20th century. The original stained-glass windows, which had been removed and placed in storage during the Letterman era, were also restored, as well as a wooden chandelier with individual stained-glass chambers. Advances in technology allowed the introduction of less intrusive sound and video equipment. The new set was described as "intimate", with a multi-tier design, many LED lighting and video projection backdrops, and a larger desk area two steps above the orchestra. Exposed for the new show, the Sullivan's dome is lighted with a digital projection system, which displays images such as a kaleidoscopic pattern with images of Colbert's face and the CBS logo. New, larger audience seats were installed, reducing the overall capacity from 461 to 370. E-J Electric also renovated the building's top four floors for Colbert's offices.

The Late Show with Stephen Colbert held its first show at the Ed Sullivan Theater on September 8, 2015. The Late Show went in production hiatus in March 2020 due to the COVID-19 pandemic in New York City, ultimately broadcasting remotely. The Late Show returned to in-studio production on August 10, 2020, but using a smaller, secondary set modeled after Colbert's personal office (with a window showing a view similar to the auditorium's main backdrop), and still having guests appear remotely. The Late Show returned to the auditorium with a studio audience on June 14, 2021. Despite subsequent increases in COVID-19 cases, Colbert said in January 2022 that he would continue to broadcast from the Ed Sullivan Theater rather than from an upper-story office. The Late Show ran at the Ed Sullivan Theater until May 21, 2026, when it was canceled. In early 2026, objects from The Late Show's set at the Ed Sullivan Theater were sold off; the actual set was given to the Museum of Broadcast Communications in Chicago.

After The Late Show aired its final episode, the venue was vacant; the Colbert marquee was replaced with signage containing the theater's name in September 2026. The theater could not be demolished due to its historic-landmark designation, and the building must legally remain a theater, though CBS had not yet announced a future tenant or permanent purpose for the broadcast space. Though CBS had no plans to sell the theater, numerous office-building landlords, as well as Broadway theater operators Shubert Organization, Nederlander Organization, and ATG Entertainment, expressed interest in potentially buying the theater building. At the time, the theater's original design remained largely intact, and there was a shortage of available Broadway theaters.

==== Other productions ====
Besides The Late Show, the Ed Sullivan Theater has occasionally staged other productions since 1993. The Rosie O'Donnell Show was broadcast from the theater for a week in October 1996 when several eighth-floor studios at NBC's 30 Rockefeller Center headquarters experienced complications from an electrical fire. An early incarnation of CBS This Morning broadcast a week of shows from the theater in May 1995, while Late Show was taping in London.

In the early 21st century, during the Late Show with David Letterman's run, the top of the theater's marquee hosted concerts by several musicians, starting with the band Bon Jovi on June 13, 2000. Subsequent appearances included Dave Matthews Band on July 15, 2002; Audioslave on November 25, 2002; Phish on June 21, 2004; Paul McCartney on July 15, 2009; and Eminem and Jay-Z in June 2010. The Sullivan also hosted finales for the reality game show Survivor, starting with Survivor: The Amazon in 2003, after a live finale outdoors in Central Park was canceled due to rain. On February 9, 2014, the 50th anniversary of the Beatles' first Ed Sullivan performance, CBS News hosted a roundtable discussion at the theater, moderated by Anthony Mason. A replica of the marquee to the theater as it looked the night of the original performance also covered up the Late Show marquee over the weekend.

CBS This Morning temporarily relocated to the Sullivan during March 2020 after its normal facilities at the CBS Broadcast Center were shut down during the COVID-19 pandemic, placing a desk used from a recent CBS News presidential debate broadcast atop the Late Show stage.

== See also ==
- List of Broadway theaters
- List of New York City Designated Landmarks in Manhattan from 14th to 59th Streets
- National Register of Historic Places listings in Manhattan from 14th to 59th Streets
