= I Hate Rock 'n' Roll =

1995 single by the Jesus and Mary Chain

Single by the Jesus and Mary Chain

from the album Hate Rock 'n' Roll
- B-side: "Bleed Me"; "33 1/3"; "Lost Star"
- Released: 5 June 1995
- Label: Blanco y Negro
- Songwriter: William Reid
- Producers: Jim Reid, William Reid

The Jesus and Mary Chain singles chronology
"Come On" (1994)	"I Hate Rock 'n' Roll" (1995)	"Cracking Up" (1998)

"I Hate Rock 'n' Roll" is a song by the Scottish alternative rock group the Jesus and Mary Chain. It was released as a single on CD and 10-inch vinyl in June 1995 and reached number 61 on the UK Singles Chart. The 10-inch format was numbered and limited to 5,000 copies, although additional copies are rumored to exist. This single was the band's last release on Blanco y Negro Records, for whom they had recorded since 1985.

In the US, the four tracks were only available on Hate Rock 'n' Roll, the band's third compilation album, released later in 1995 by American Recordings. A reworked version of the track, retitled "I Love Rock 'n' Roll", was later included on the group's sixth album, Munki, released in 1998.

== Track listing ==
10" (NEG 81TEX) and CD single (NEG81CD)

1. "I Hate Rock 'n' Roll" (William Reid) – 3:46
2. "Bleed Me" (Jim Reid) – 3:37
3. "33 1/3" (J. Reid) – 3:17
4. "Lost Star" (W. Reid) – 2:05

== Personnel ==
The Jesus and Mary Chain

- Jim Reid – vocals, guitar, production
- William Reid – vocals, guitar, production
- Ben Lurie – bass, guitar
- Nick Sanderson – drums

Additional personnel

- Dick Meaney – engineer
