= Eddie Bracken =

American actor (1915–2002)

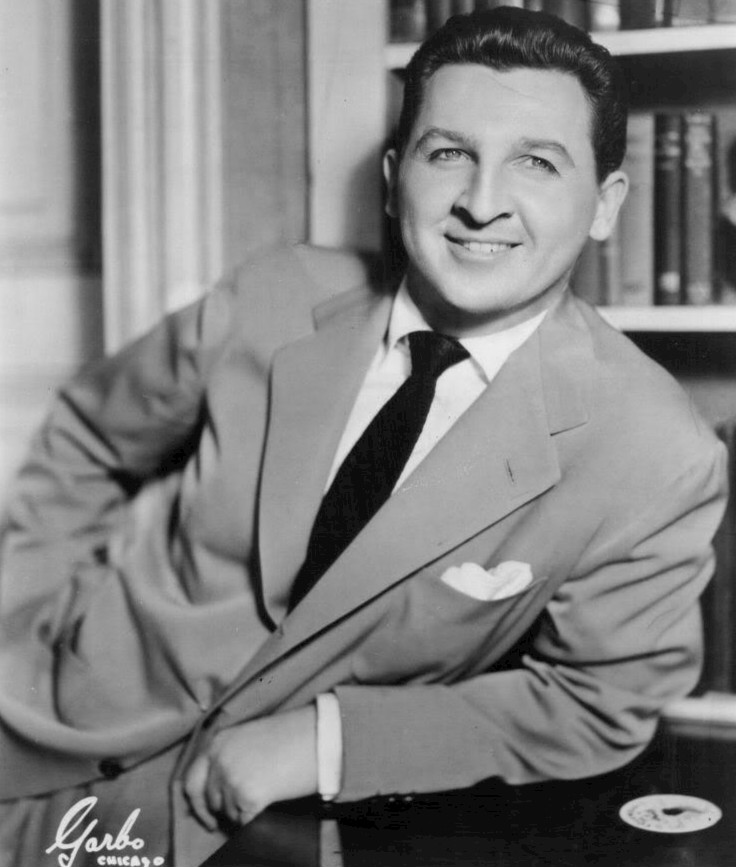
- Born: Edward Vincent Bracken; February 7, 1915; Astoria, Queens, New York, U.S.
- Died: November 14, 2002 (aged 87); Glen Ridge, New Jersey, U.S.
- Occupations: Actor; comedian; singer
- Years active: 1930–2002
- Spouse: Connie Nickerson (m. 1939; died 2002)
- Children: 5

Edward Vincent Bracken (February 7, 1915 – November 14, 2002) was an American actor. Bracken came to Hollywood prominence for his comedic lead performances in the films Hail the Conquering Hero and The Miracle of Morgan's Creek both from 1944, both of which have been preserved by the National Film Registry. During this era, he also had success on Broadway, with performances in plays like Too Many Girls (1940).

Bracken's later movie roles include National Lampoon's Vacation (1983), Oscar (1991), Home Alone 2: Lost in New York (1992), Rookie of the Year (1993), and Baby's Day Out (1994).

== Life and career ==
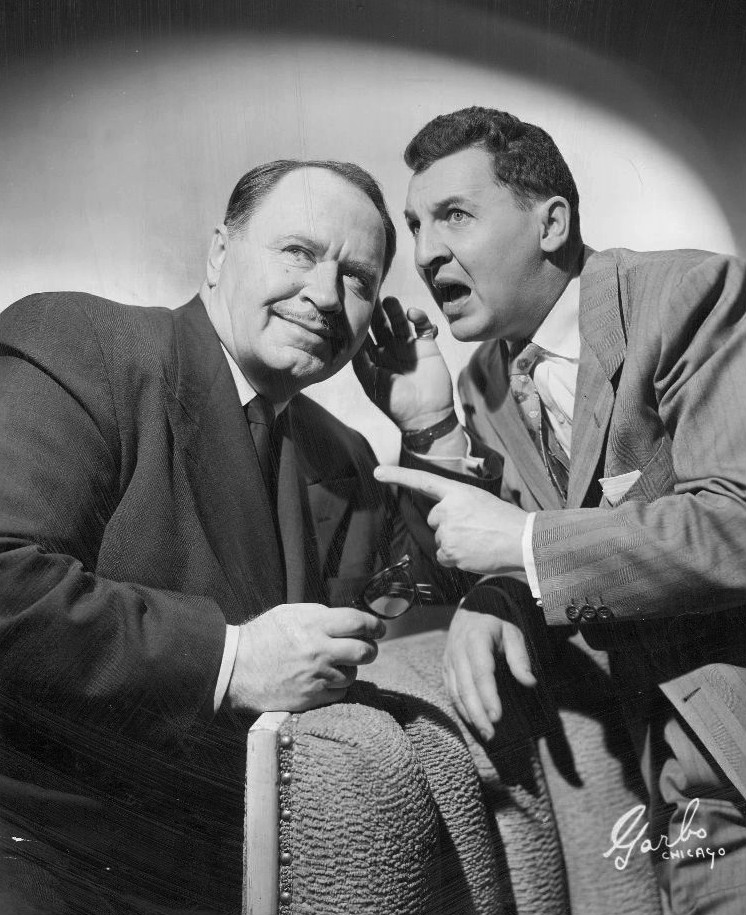
Howard Freeman and Eddie Bracken, 1954

Edward Vincent Bracken was born in Astoria, Queens, New York on February 7, 1915, the son of Joseph L. and Catherine Bracken. Bracken performed in vaudeville at the age of nine and gained fame with the Broadway musical Too Many Girls in a role he reprised for the 1940 film adaptation. He had performed in a short film series called The Kiddie Troupers (one of many Our Gang-like series) prior to that, but that film was his big break. In 1936, Bracken enjoyed success on Broadway with his starring run in the Joseph Viertel play So Proudly We Hail. The military drama, co-starring Richard Cromwell, opened to much fanfare but closed after 14 performances at the 46th Street Theatre.

In the 1940s, director Preston Sturges cast Bracken in two of his films, The Miracle of Morgan's Creek, opposite Betty Hutton, and Hail the Conquering Hero. Due to the popularity of these films, Eddie Bracken was a household name during World War II. He made numerous radio broadcasts and had his own program, The Eddie Bracken Show.

In 1953, Bracken left Hollywood. He appeared on Broadway in Shinbone Alley; Hello, Dolly!; The Odd Couple; and Sugar Babies. His last appearance on Broadway was in the musical Dreamtime, directed by David Niles at the Ed Sullivan Theater, at the age of 77. In 1970, he purchased the Coconut Grove Playhouse in Miami, Florida for $1 million.

Bracken's television roles between 1952 and 2000 include an episode of The Golden Girls as Rose Nylund's ex-childhood boyfriend from St. Olaf, as well as an episode of Tales from the Darkside playing a stubborn old man who refuses to believe that he has died. After nearly 30 years out of feature films, he returned to perform character roles, including the sympathetic Walley World theme park founder Mr. Roy Walley in National Lampoon's Vacation (1983), Five Spot Charlie in Oscar (1991), Duncan's Toy Chest toy store owner Mr. Duncan in Home Alone 2: Lost in New York (1992), and Chicago Cubs team owner Bob Carson in Rookie of the Year (1993). He had a cameo role in Patrick Read Johnson's 1994 film, Baby's Day Out, as one of the veterans in the old soldiers' home. Bracken also had a long career with Paper Mill Playhouse in New Jersey, starring in dozens of productions from the 1980s to the early 2000s. One high point was their production of Show Boat in which he played Captain Andy Hawkes. This production was broadcast on PBS in 1990.

Bracken acted in films with two actors who later became U.S. Presidents: Ronald Reagan and Donald Trump. He co-starred in The Girl from Jones Beach with Reagan in 1949, and Trump played a minor part in Home Alone 2: Lost in New York in 1992.

Bracken campaigned for Republican Thomas E. Dewey during the 1944 U.S. presidential election campaign.

=== Death ===
On November 14, 2002, Bracken died in Glen Ridge, New Jersey, of complications from surgery for a crushed disk in his neck at the age of 87. His wife of 63 years, Connie Nickerson, a former actress, died in August 2002, just three months before his death. He met Connie when they performed together in a road company of the Broadway play What a Life in 1938. Together Eddie and Connie had five children: two sons (Michael and David) and three daughters (Judy, Carolyn and Susan).

=== Hollywood Walk of Fame ===
For his contributions to radio and television, Bracken has two stars on the Hollywood Walk of Fame, at 1651 Vine Street and 6751 Hollywood Boulevard respectively.

== Filmography ==
- Pacific Liner (1939) as Junior officer (uncredited)
- Too Many Girls (1940) as Jojo Jordan
- Life with Henry (1941) as 'Dizzy' Stevens
- Reaching for the Sun (1941) as Benny Hogan
- Caught in the Draft (1941) as Bert Sparks
- Safeguarding Military Information (1942) (short subject for military training)
- The Fleet's In (1942) as Barney Waters
- Star Spangled Rhythm (1942) as Johnny Webster
- Sweater Girl (1942) as Jack Mitchell
- Happy Go Lucky (1943) as Wally Case
- Young and Willing (1943) as George Bodell
- The Miracle of Morgan's Creek (1944) as Norval Jones
- Hail the Conquering Hero (1944) as Woodrow Truesmith
- Rainbow Island (1944) as Toby Smith
- Bring on the Girls (1945) as J. Newport Bates
- Out of this World (1945) as Herbie Fenton
- Duffy's Tavern (1945) as Eddie Bracken
- Hold That Blonde! (1945) as Ogden Spencer Trulow III
- Ladies' Man (1947) as Henry Haskell
- Fun on a Weekend (1947) as Pete Porter aka P.P. Porterhouse III
- The Girl from Jones Beach (1949) as Chuck Donovan
- Summer Stock (1950) as Orville Wingait
- Two Tickets to Broadway (1951) as Lew Conway
- About Face (1952) as Biff Roberts
- We're Not Married! (1952) as Wilson Boswell 'Willie' Fisher
- The Gulf Playhouse (Television series, 1952) as Lt. Merivale R. Colquhoun
- A Slight Case of Larceny (1953) as Frederick Winthrop Clopp
- Lux Video Theatre (Television series, 1953) as Larry
- Schlitz Playhouse (Television series, 1953–1956) as Gunner's Mate
- Playhouse 90 (Television series, 1957) as Stephen Minch
- The Roaring 20s (Television series, 1961) as Ace Johnson
- Always on Sunday (1962) Bit Part (uncredited)
- Going My Way (Television series, 1962) as Danny Everett
- Rawhide (Television series, 1963–1964) as Edgar Allan Smithers / Morris G. Stevens
- Burke's Law (Television series, 1964–1965) as Simeon Quatraine / 'Evil Eye' Hatton
- Shinbone Alley (1970) as Archy (voice)
- The New Dick Van Dyke Show (Television series, 1973) as Eddie
- Busting Loose (Television series, 1977)
- National Lampoon's Vacation (1983) as Roy Walley
- Tales from the Darkside (Television series, 1984) 'A Case of the Stubborns' as Grandpa
- Murder, She Wrote (Television series, 1985) as Barney Ogden
- The Wind in the Willows (1987) as Moley
- The Golden Girls (Television series, 1990) as Buzz
- Oscar (1991) as Five Spot Charlie
- Home Alone 2: Lost in New York (1992) as E.F. Duncan
- Rookie of the Year (1993) as Bob Carson
- Baby's Day Out (1994) as Old Timer
- The Brave Little Toaster to the Rescue (1997) as Sebastian (voice) (direct-to-video)

== Stage credits ==
- Lottery (1930)
- The Man in Stilts (1931)
- The Lady Refuses (1933)
- The Drunkard (1934)
- Life's Too Short (1935)
- So Proudly We Hail (1936)
- Iron Men (1936)
- Brother Rat (1937)
- What A Life (1938–1939)
- Too Many Girls (1939)
- The Seven Year Itch (1953–1959)
- The Tender Trap (1953–1956)
- Will Success Spoil Rock Hunter? (1956)
- The Teahouse of the August Moon (1956)
- Shinbone Alley (1957)
- Three Men on a Horse (1957)
- The Tunnel of Love (1958)
- Where's Charley? (1958)
- Visit to a Small Planet (1958)
- Say Darling (1959)
- The Golden Fleecing (1960)
- Finian's Rainbow (1960)
- Mister Roberts (1960)
- Beg, Borrow or Steal (1960)
- Hot September (1965) (closed on the road)
- The Odd Couple (1965)
- You Know I Can't Hear You When the Water's Running (1967–1968)
- The Girl in the Freudian Slip (1972)
- Never Too Late (1973)
- Born Yesterday (1974)
- The Sunshine Boys (1975)
- Hot Line to Heaven (1975)
- Hello Dolly! (1977–1980)
- Show Boat (1979–1980)
- Sugar Babies (1981–1982)
- Damn Yankees (1981)
- Kismet (1984)
- Show Boat (1985)
- Sugar Babies (1986–1987)
- Show Boat (1988–1989)
- Babes in Toyland (1991)
- The Wizard of Oz (1992)
- Dreamtime (1992)
- It Runs in the Family (1993–1994)
- These Golden Years (1996)
- No, No, Nanette (1997)
- Follies (1998)
- The Student Prince (2000)
- Carousel (2001)

== Radio appearances ==
Year	Program	Episode/source
1944	Suspense Mystery Radio Play	The Visitor
1947	Suspense Mystery Radio Play	Elwood
1953	Broadway Playhouse	Hail the Conquering Hero

== Television appearances ==
Year	Program	Character	Notes
1952	What's My Line	Himself	Sep 7
1990	The Golden Girls	Buzz Mueller	Twice in a Lifetime
