= The Dreamer =

The Dreamer may refer to:

== Comics ==
- The Dreamer (comics), a 1985 semi-autobiographical graphic novel by Will Eisner
- The Dreamer (webcomic), a 2007–2017 comic book series and webcomic by Lora Innes

== Film and television ==
- The Dreamer (1916 film), directed by Alfred Hollingsworth
- The Dreamer (1936 film), a German film directed by Carl Froelich
- The Dreamer (1947 film), a film featuring Mantan Moreland
- The Dreamer (1965 film), an Italian film directed by Massimo Franciosa
- The Dreamer (1970 film), an Israeli film directed by Dan Wolman
- The Dreamer (2016 film), a Peruvian-French romantic drama film
- The Dreamer (TV series), a 2020 South Korean esports program

== Music ==
=== Albums ===
- The Dreamer (Blake Shelton album) or the title song, 2003
- The Dreamer (Etta James album), 2011
- The Dreamer (Jimmy MacCarthy album), 1994
- The Dreamer (José James album) or the title song, 2008
- The Dreamer (Rhett Miller album), 2012
- The Dreamer (Tamyra Gray album), 2004
- The Dreamer (Yusef Lateef album) or the title song, 1959
- The Dreamer, by Mister Speed (Benjamin Speed), 2007
- The Dreamer, by Khalil Fong, 2024
- The Dreamer – Joseph: Part One, by Neal Morse, 2023

=== Songs ===
- "The Dreamer", written by Arthur Schwartz and Frank Loesser for the film Thank Your Lucky Stars, 1943
- "The Dreamer", by Badfinger from Airwaves, 1979
- "The Dreamer", by Common from The Dreamer/The Believer, 2011
- "The Dreamer", by Neil Sedaka, 1963
- "The Dreamer", by Ryan Sheridan, 2011

== Other uses ==
- The Dreamer (painting), a c. 1712–1717 painting by Antoine Watteau
- The Dreamer (sculpture), a 1979 sculpture by Manuel Izquierdo in Portland, Oregon, US
- The Dreamer: An Autobiography, a 2020 book by Cliff Richard

== See also ==
- Dreamer (disambiguation)
- The Dreamers (disambiguation)
