= Dreaming Creek =

Dreaming Creek may refer to:

- Dreaming Creek (Kentucky), a stream in Madison County
- Dreaming Creek (Virginia), a stream in Lynchburg
