= Beautiful Dreamer (disambiguation) =

"Beautiful Dreamer" is an American popular song written by Stephen Foster.

Beautiful Dreamer may also refer to:

== Fictional characters ==
- Beautiful Dreamer (Marvel Comics), a Marvel Comics character
- Beautiful Dreamer, a comic book character and member of the Forever People

== Film and television ==
- Beautiful Dreamer (2006 film), a 2006 American film
- Beautiful Dreamer: Brian Wilson and the Story of Smile, a 2004 documentary film
- Beautiful Dreamers, a 1990 Canadian film
- Urusei Yatsura 2: Beautiful Dreamer (1984), an anime film
- "Beautiful Dreamer" (Bless This House), a 1976 episode
- "Beautiful Dreamer", an episode of Touched by an Angel

== Music ==
- Beautiful Dreamer (album), a compilation album of contemporary artists playing Stephen Foster songs
- Beautiful Dreamers (album), a 2010 album by guitarist Bill Frisell featuring a version of the Stephen Foster song
