= The Dreaming (Scottish band) =

- Also known as: Tinderbox
- Origin: Scotland
- Genre: Rock
- Years active: 1993–1998, 2007-present
- Label: Freaked Records
- Members: Charlie Love; John Anderson; Carol Anderson; Keith Beacom; Sarah Barnes; Scott Lyon; Graham Shedden; Stuart Gordon
- Website: The Dreaming/Tinderbox

The Dreaming are a celtic rock band based in Scotland. The group were formed in 1993 by two friends Charlie Love (vocals/guitars/mandolins) and John Anderson (guitars). The original membership of the group also consisted of Karen Mathiewson (Fiddle), Keith Beacom (Drums), Anna Towler (Vocals) and Stuart Gordon (Bass Guitar).

The group had some noted success between 1992 and 1997 touring with Runrig, Texas, Travis and others with appearances with Van Morrison, The Waterboys, Big Country and others.

== Albums ==
The Dreaming E.P.
The band recorded The Dreaming E.P. which featured the songs "I Want Out", "Fake", "The Haunting" and "For The Children".

The self-financed recording sold several thousand copies and attracted initial record company interest. The recording also prompted Runrig's manager, Marlene Ross, to book the unsigned Aberdeen band for the support slot on the "Castle and Canvas Tour 1994".

Following on from this appearance The Dreaming where booked to play at the 1st and 2nd Celtic Connections Festival in Glasgow.

Let The Feast Of Fools Begin
The first full album recorded by the band contained one side of studio tracks, recorded at The Mill Studio, Crathes and one side live, recorded at The Lemon Tree, Aberdeen. The track list was: Side 1 (studio) "Thorn In My Pride", "Girl With Brown Eyes", "Jane", "Rain On The Level", Side 2 (live) "I Want Out", "Broken", "The Haunting", "Happy" and was produced by Pallas guitarist, Niall Mathewson.
The song "Rain On The Level" is written about "The Level" in Brighton, which is an open green space in the middle of the town where Charlie slept when busking in England.

Live At The Arches
Live At The Arches, was recorded in Christmas 1994 in The Arches. A limited release of 1000 which included the tracks - "Thorn In My Pride", "I Want Out", "Satellite", "Rain On The Level", "Happy", "Fake", "The Haunting", "The Road" and "World Song".

The Christmas concert also featured Martyn Bennett and The Humpff Family (who do not appear on the recording).

War Of Currents
In mid of 1995 War Of Currents was released as a second limited pressing live album. This album contained the complete live show recorded in 1993 for Let The Feast Of Fools Begin and was remixed at The Mill Studio in Crathes by Niall Mathewson.

== Battle with EMI ==
In mid-1995, EMI threatened legal action against The Dreaming because another act by the same name had been signed by the record company. After lengthy proceedings, The Dreaming changed their name to Tinderbox and continued playing and recording until 1998. The other Dreaming disappeared shortly after one tour with Deacon Blue.

== Reformation ==
In 2007, The Dreaming reformed and announced a one-off concert at The Lemon Tree in Aberdeen. Following this event, at which the band performed as The Dreaming / Tinderbox, they release a digital best of album under the title "Tales Of The Evening...The Best Of The Dreaming / Tinderbox". This release includes a variety of material from their recording career including previously unreleased tracks.

== References and notes ==
- "Fit Like New York": The history of rock music in Aberdeen and North East Scotland by Peter Innes, ISBN 1-901300-02-1
