= Munki =

Studio album by The Jesus and Mary Chain
- Released: 2 June 1998
- Genre: Alternative rock
- Length: 69:28
- Label: Creation (UK), Sub Pop (US)
- Producer: Jim Reid, William Reid

The Jesus and Mary Chain chronology
Hate Rock 'N' Roll (1995)	Munki (1998)	The Complete John Peel Sessions (2000)

Singles from Munki
- 1. "I Hate Rock 'n' Roll" Released: May 1995; 2. "Cracking Up" Released: April 1998; 3. "I Love Rock 'n' Roll" Released: May 1998

Munki is the sixth studio album released by Scottish alternative rock band The Jesus and Mary Chain. After leaving Blanco y Negro, the Reid brothers signed to Sub Pop in the U.S. and Creation, who had released their debut single "Upside Down" in 1984, in the UK. Munki peaked at No. 47 in the UK album charts, the band's first studio album not to make the Top 40. It would also be the band's last album for 19 years, as they would release their next studio album Damage and Joy in 2017.

The album features an appearance from Hope Sandoval of Mazzy Star, who had previously duetted with the band on the single "Sometimes Always", and includes the singles "I Hate Rock 'n' Roll" (released in 1995), "Cracking Up" and "I Love Rock 'n' Roll".

== Background ==
The origin of the album title, according to Ben Lurie in an interview with Spin magazine, was that they "wanted an un-Mary Chain-like title...It doesn't mean anything. It's just a word. Misspelled on purpose." In an interview with The Herald, Jim said that their sister Linda suggested it. This was the band's final studio album before their 8-year breakup from October 1999 to June 2007.

The band returned to their original record company, Creation, due to parting with Warner Records, however the band were surprised to see how much their label had changed since they had left the label, Jim Reid said. "The first time we were on Creation we spent days folding the paper covers inside plastic sleeves for 'Upside Down' in Alan McGee's back bedroom in Tottenham. Alan still held down a day job back then, so to go back 15 years later to do Munki it was like they'd become a proper record company!"

The album is often thought of as sounding "divided" due to the Reids' crumbling relationship, as Jim Reid recalled: "Me and William weren't really getting along at all. That last year we barely even spoke. Munki is one of my favorite albums, but it was really divided. William would go into the studio with the rest of the band and record while I wasn't there, and then I'd go in with them when William wasn't there."

According to an interview in Alternative Press magazine, Jim said that "I Hate Rock 'n' Roll" was written by his brother "out of sheer frustration with the kind of crap we have to deal with in the music business." To counterbalance these sentiments, Jim wrote "I Love Rock 'n' Roll" because "I thought it left [Munki] kind of negative - I felt it was only half the story." In the same issue of Alt Press, Munki was rated a perfect 5 out 5.

== Release ==
"Cracking Up", the second single taken from Munki, was released by Creation Records in April 1998. It reached #35 in the UK single charts.

The third single, "I Love Rock 'n' Roll" was released by Creation Records in May 1998 and reached #38 in the UK single charts. The song is a reworked version of a previous song, "I Hate Rock 'n' Roll", which was included in the band's 1995 compilation album, Hate Rock 'n' Roll. It was the band's last single before they split up.

== Reception ==
Professional ratings
Review scores
Source	Rating
AllMusic	3/5 stars
Alternative Press	5/5 stars
Drowned in Sound	7/10
Entertainment Weekly	B+
Los Angeles Times	3/4 stars
NME	6/10
Pitchfork Media	7.1/10
Rolling Stone	3/5 stars
Uncut	4/5 stars
Wall of Sound	85/100

Jason Ankeny of AllMusic gave the album a three star review, saying "Munki, is schizophrenic and impassioned, a record that both summarizes the band's career to date and cleans the slate for their future. Virtually each of the 17 tracks here echoes a prior moment in the Chain's existence, moving at breakneck pace from the volcanic noise of their earliest material to the bleak grace of Darklands, through to the sleek, supercharged pop of Automatic -- even Mazzy Star's Hope Sandoval makes a cameo, as she did on Stoned & Dethroned. In a sense, it's an ideal primer to the Reid brothers' mercurial world, flirting with both brilliance and mediocrity; even after well over a decade, the Jesus and Mary Chain continue to thrill, irritate, and confound -- they're a true love/hate obsession."

Dom Gourlay of Drowned in Sound praised the album saying retrospectively, "Looking back at Munki now, it's one of those records that in hindsight serves as a document of a band that's falling apart. The likes of 'Commercial' and 'Never Understood' have a tragicomic edge to them not previously displayed by the Mary Chain." and noted "It's also worth remembering that Munki initially came out amidst a sea of all things Britpop yet still managed to achieve a longevity and relevance many other records released that year (1998) haven't succeeded in doing so."

Entertainment Weekly praised the album, giving it a B+ "After a four-year exile, Jim and William Reid still have the gall to pen ”school-fool-cool” rhymes, filch classic melodies (Buddy Holly's ”It’s So Easy”), wallow in guitar noise, and fret over their "darkened souls". Thank God. They almost discover trip-hop on ”Perfume,” a keyboard-spiked seance with Hope Sandoval. Otherwise it's rock minimalism as usual — less glacial, maybe, but still able to sink ships."

== Track listing ==
=== Double-LP (CRELP 232 / SP 426) ===
Disc one – Side A

1. "I Love Rock 'n' Roll" (Jim Reid) – 2:37
2. "Birthday" (William Reid) – 3:57
3. "Stardust Remedy" (J. Reid) – 2:26
4. "Fizzy" (W. Reid) – 3:39

Disc one – Side B

1. "Moe Tucker" (J. Reid) – 3:19
2. "Perfume" (W. Reid) – 4:39
3. "Virtually Unreal" (J. Reid) – 3:38
4. "Degenerate" (W. Reid) – 5:29

Disc two – Side A

1. "Cracking Up" (W. Reid) – 4:40
2. "Commercial" (W. Reid) – 7:02
3. "Supertramp" (J. Reid) – 3:37
4. "Never Understood" (W. Reid) – 4:14

Disc two – Side B

1. "I Can't Find the Time for Times" (W. Reid) – 4:17
2. "Man on the Moon" (J. Reid) – 3:41
3. "Black" (W. Reid) – 5:18
4. "Dream Lover" (J. Reid) – 3:05
5. "I Hate Rock 'n' Roll" (W. Reid) – 3:42

=== CD (CRECD 232 / SPCD 426) ===
1. "I Love Rock 'n' Roll" (J. Reid) – 2:37
2. "Birthday" (W. Reid) – 3:57
3. "Stardust Remedy" (J. Reid) – 2:26
4. "Fizzy" (W. Reid) – 3:39
5. "Moe Tucker" (J. Reid) – 3:19
6. "Perfume" (W. Reid) – 4:39
7. "Virtually Unreal" (J. Reid) – 3:38
8. "Degenerate" (W. Reid) – 5:29
9. "Cracking Up" (W. Reid) – 4:40
10. "Commercial" (W. Reid) – 7:02
11. "Supertramp" (J. Reid) – 3:37
12. "Never Understood" (W. Reid) – 4:14
13. "I Can't Find the Time for Times" (W. Reid) – 4:17
14. "Man on the Moon" (J. Reid) – 3:41
15. "Black" (W. Reid) – 5:18
16. "Dream Lover" (J. Reid) – 3:05
17. "I Hate Rock 'n' Roll" (W. Reid) – 3:42

== Personnel ==
=== The Jesus and Mary Chain ===
- Jim Reid – vocals (tracks 1, 2, 3, 5, 7, 10, 11, 13, 14, 16), guitar, production
- William Reid – vocals (tracks 2, 4, 6, 8, 9, 12, 15, 17), guitar, production
- Ben Lurie – guitar, bass
- Nick Sanderson – drums

=== Additional personnel ===
- Sister Vanilla – vocals (track 5)
- Sean Lebon – vocals (track 5)
- Hope Sandoval – vocals (track 6)
- Terry Edwards – horns
- Dick Meaney – mixing (tracks 1 to 7, 9 to 12, 14, 16, 17)
- Alan Moulder – mixing (tracks 8, 13, 15)
- Nick Addison – additional mixing (track 6)
