= Dreamlovers (band) =

Belgian pop group

Dreamlovers is a Belgian pop group.

== Discography ==
- Nothing's Gonna Change My Love For You (CD, Single) Arcade Music Company (Belgium) 1999
- 15 Hits (CD) CNR Music 2000 #5 in the Ultratop
- Always Be With You (CD, Single), Arcade Music Company (Belgium), 2000
- Someone Loves You Honey & The Way You Are (CD, Single), CNR Music, 2000
- 18 Hits (CD), Mouse Music Company, 2001, #1 in the Ultratop
- I Just Can't Help Believin' (CD, Single), Mouse Music Company, 2001
- Love Story (CD, Single), Mouse Music Company, 2001
- 18 Hits III (CD, Album), Mouse Music Company, 2002, #1 in the Ultratop
- I Can See Clearly Now (CD, Single), Mouse Music Company, 2002
- Stop! (CD, Single), Mouse Music Company, 2002
- 20 Hits 4 (CD, Album), #1 in the Ultratop
- 20 Best Slows (CD), Universal Music (Belgium), 2004
