= Dreaming Creek (Virginia) =

Physical characteristics
- Source
  - coordinates: 37.3270878°N 79.2253023°W
- Mouth
  - coordinates: 37.3806981°N 79.2080806°W

Dreaming Creek is a stream in Lynchburg, Virginia, in the United States. It is a branch of the James River.

== See also ==
- List of rivers of Virginia
