= PJ-II Dreamer =

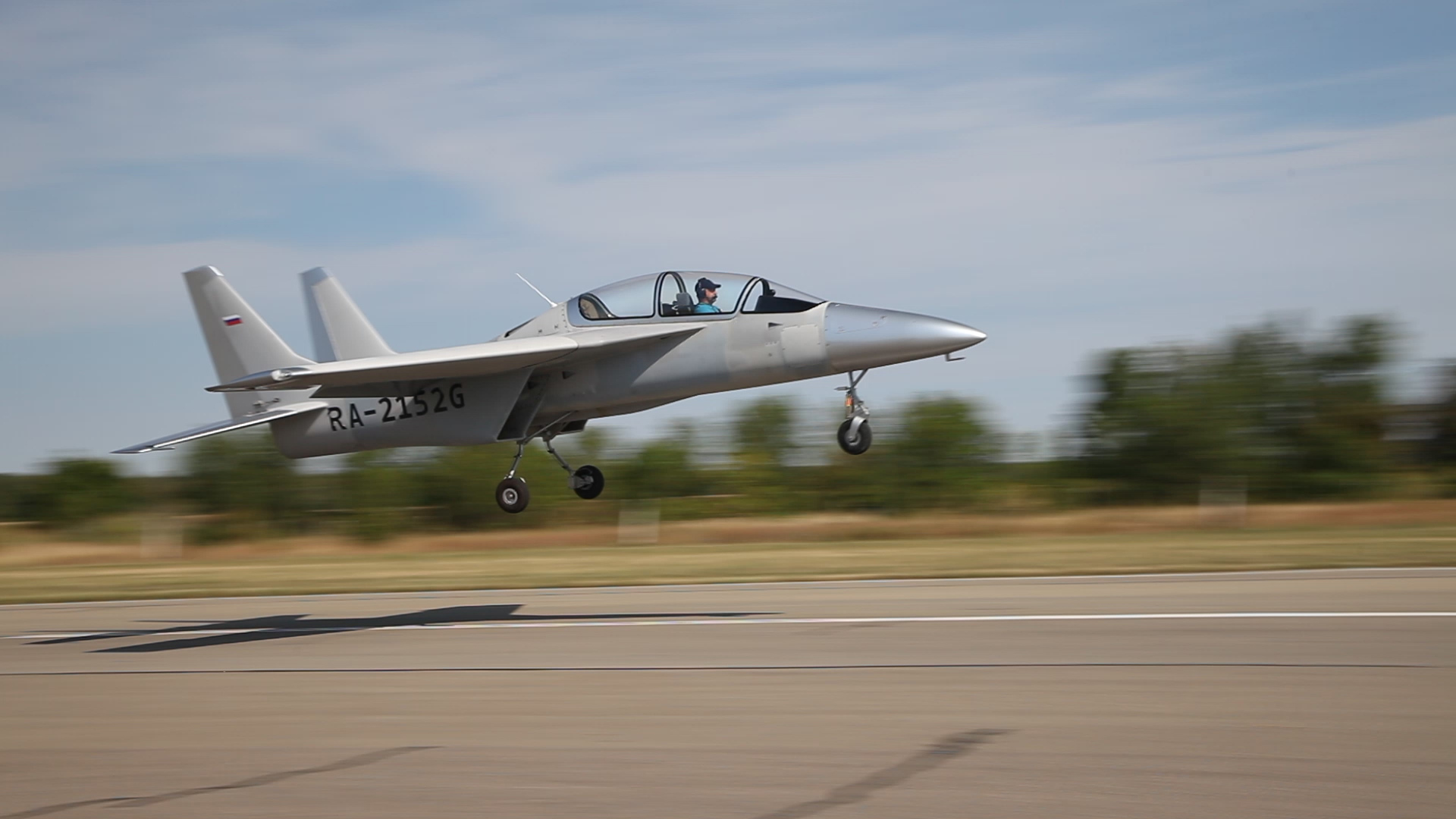

General information
- Type: Kit aircraft
- National origin: United States/Russia
- Manufacturer: Aeroconcept, LLC
- Designer: Ben Kolotilin
- Status: Flying prototype

History
- First flight: March 17, 2015

The PJ-II Dreamer is a two-seat, mid-wing monoplane. Propelled by ducted fans, the aircraft features a tandem seat layout with dual controls, a retractable landing gear, and a composite construction.

== Details ==
The Dreamer aircraft uses a special type of propulsion system called a dual ducted fan. This system gives it similar handling to a jet engine but is cheaper and less complicated to operate. Unlike propeller-driven planes, it doesn't have torque or P-factor issues, which are forces that can make the aircraft harder to control.

The aircraft is powered by a single General Motors LS6 5.7-liter V8 engine, which is liquid-cooled and produces 388 horsepower. There's also an option for a more powerful 450 horsepower engine.

The Dreamer can reach a top speed of 218 mph (351 km/h) and has a cruising speed of 187 mph (301 km/h). It can handle forces up to +4.4 g and as low as -2.2 g which allows the aircraft to perform some aerobatic maneuvers.

== See also ==
- G-Aerosports Archon
- Windstar YF-80
- Me 262 Project

== Sources ==
- Piloot en Vliegtuig - Editie 08-2016 augustus 2016. Article "Opvallend: de Russische Sky World PJ-11 Dreamer, net een F-15 maar dan in zakenuitvoering."
- Replica fighters magazine - December 2022. Article "PJ II Dreamer An update from Ben Kolotilin"
- Replica fighters magazine - July 2016. Article "Enter jet age. The Russians are coming"
