= Louise Hunter =

American actress

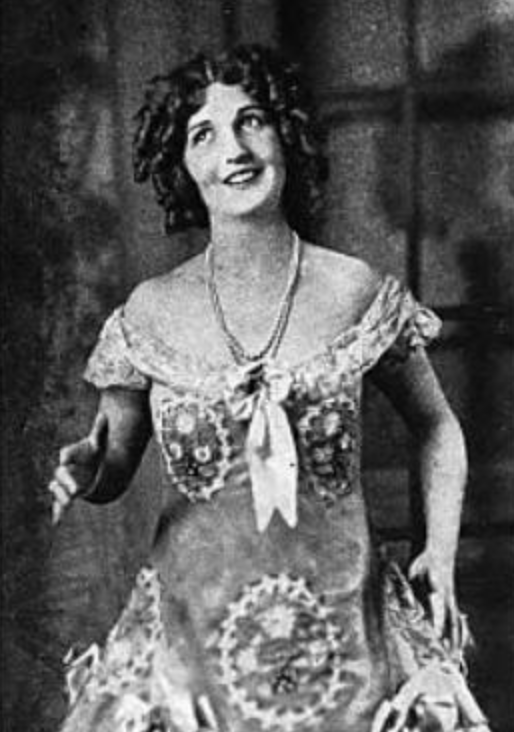
- Louise Hunter, from a 1929 publication
- Born: Louise Todhunter; Middletown, Ohio, U.S.
- Died: September 13, 1981; Denver, Colorado, U.S.
- Other names: Louise Hunter Windsor
- Occupation(s): Opera singer, operetta singer
- Relatives: Henry Haven Windsor (father-in-law)

Louise Hunter (died September 13, 1981), born Louise Todhunter, was an operatic soprano. After four years at the Metropolitan Opera singing small roles, she transitioned to operetta. She created the title role in the Broadway musical Golden Dawn.

== Early life and education ==
Anna Louise Todhunter was born in Middletown, Ohio. At the age of 10, while attending public school, she began taking vocal lessons from B. W. Foley of the Cincinnati Conservatory. Upon hearing her, Mrs. George M. Verity of Dayton, Ohio arranged for Louise to study at the Schuster-Martin School of Drama in Cincinnati.

== Career ==
Beginning in 1923, now billed as Louise Hunter, she appeared with the De Feo Opera Company singing Musetta in La bohème, Nedda in Pagliacci and Micaela in Carmen.

Hunter signed a four-year contract with the Metropolitan Opera in October 1923. She made her first appearance with the company on November 11, 1923, singing Act II of Lucia di Lammermoor at one of the company's Sunday evening concerts. Her first staged appearance took place on November 17, 1923, as one of the three orphans in Der Rosenkavalier. Although she sang small roles, among her more notable assumptions were Musetta in La Boheme, Feodor in Boris Godunov, Yniold in Pelléas et Mélisande, and Papagena in Die Zauberflöte. She sang Olympia in The Tales of Hoffmann for a single performance on April 25, 1925, while the Met was on tour in Atlanta. She received a positive review, with the reviewer noting that Hunter would be appearing in Atlanta that summer for a season of light opera. Her final performance with the company took place on April 30, 1927, on tour in Atlanta where she sang the role of Stephano in Roméo et Juliette. She had given 139 performances with the company.

During the summers, Hunter sang in Atlanta with the Municipal Light Opera. Among the operettas she sang were The Firefly, The Chocolate Soldier, Naughty Marietta, Robin Hood, The Pirates of Penzance, and Katinka. Of a 1926 performance of Franz Lehár's The Merry Widow an unnamed reviewer wrote: "Possessing the most of this world's good, Louise Hunter is an outstanding personality. She has the sparkle of youth, she has unusual beauty, she is an actress of very high caliber, and, to crown it all, she has that gloriously lovely voice."

In January 1927 it was announced that Hunter had left the Metropolitan Opera and signed a five-year contract with Arthur Hammerstein to appear in operettas. She appeared in only one of Hammerstein's productions creating the title role in Golden Dawn, which opened on Broadway on November 30, 1927. Her final performance in the role was at the matinee of February 18, 1927, during which she became violently ill. She was rushed to the hospital for an appendectomy.

During her convalescence she announced her release from Hammerstein's contract (which he granted) in order to marry. Although officially retired after 1928, she continued singing informally. A 1934 notice had her singing in a Palm Beach chapel.

== Personal life ==
On January 22, 1928, she married Henry Haven Windsor, Jr., son of Henry Haven Windsor, founder of Popular Mechanics. They had two sons, Henry Haven Windsor III (1929-2003), and William Todhunter Windsor (born 1930). The Windsors divorced in Chicago on February 15, 1943. (Five weeks later, Henry H. Windsor, Jr. married Dorothy Foltz on March 24, 1943.)

Louise Hunter Windsor (as she was named after her first marriage and divorce) moved to Denver in 1962. She died there September 13, 1981. She was survived by six grandchildren, including grandsons Willie Windsor (a songwriter based in Nashville) and John Windsor, an actor.
