= The Dreamers =

Dreamers or The Dreamers may refer to:

== Books ==
- "Dreamers", a 1918 war poem by Siegfried Sassoon
- "The Dreamers" (play), a 1982 play by Jack Davis
- The Dreamers (novel series), a 2003–06 fantasy series by David Eddings and Leigh Eddings
- The Dreamers (novel), a 2019 science-fiction novel by Karen Thompson Walker
- Dreamers (novel), a 1904 novel by Knut Hamsun
- The Dreamers (novella), a 2024 novella by Stephen King

== Film and TV ==
- Dreamers (2009 film), a Bosnian short documentary film
- Unsettled Land, also called The Dreamers, 1987 Hebrew film by Uri Barbash
- The Dreamers (2003 film), a film by director Bernardo Bertolucci
- The Dreamers (unfinished film), an unfinished film from Orson Welles
- Dreamers (2025 film), a British film

== Music ==
- The Dreamers (opera), a 1996 chamber opera by David Conte
- Freddie and the Dreamers, 1960s British beat music band
- The Dreamers of Phi Mu Alpha, an all-male a cappella group at Penn State
- Dreamers, the first name used by the alternative rock band Concrete Blonde, apparently for a single recording ("Heart Attack")
- Dreamers (band), an American pop-rock duo
- The Dreamers (album)
- The Dreamers, a doo wop group founded in 1954

=== Albums ===
- Dreamers (Shine Bright Baby album), 2013
- Dreamers (Take That album), 2026
- Dreamers, 2017 album by Mighty Oaks

=== Songs ===
- "The Dreamers", a song by David Bowie from the album Hours
- "Dreamers", 1981 single by David Soul written by J. Murphy, D. McKenzie
- "Dreamers", 1981 song by Firefall, written by David Muse, George Hawkins
- "Dreamers", song from the musical Jean Seberg by Marvin Hamlisch and Christopher Adler; 1984 single by Frankie Vaughan
- "Dreamers" (Rizzle Kicks song), 2012
- "Dreamers", a song by Janyse Jaud, 2008
- "Dreamers", a song by Jack Savoretti
- "Dreamers", a song by K.Flay from Every Where Is Some Where, 2017
- "Dreamers" (Jung Kook song), 2022

== Other uses ==
- The Dreamers (sculpture), an art work by Larry Zink and Monica Taylor
- DREAMers, recipients of U.S. resident status under the DREAM Act or DACA
- Oneirodidae, a family of deepsea anglerfish commonly called "dreamers"

== See also ==
- The Dreamer (disambiguation)
