= Dreamtime (musical) =

Musical by Jean Marc Cerrone and David Niles

- Original Broadway poster
- Music: Marc Cerrone
- Lyrics: David Niles; Bob Mitchell
- Book: David Niles
- Basis: Concept by Cerrone
- Productions: Broadway 1992 The Ed Sullivan Theater

Dreamtime is an original musical by Jean Marc Cerrone and David Niles. It was created by Niles, based on an original story by Cerrone. Niles wrote the book for the musical. The show's message is the power of love and dreams. Billed as a "New Broadway Musical Experience," the show combined giant screen images in high definition with live actors, music and laser lighting effects. The hi-tech, quick editing equipment incorporated into the theater allowed the audience members to be videotaped upon their entrance and become part of the show's finale. Dreamtime ran on Broadway at the Ed Sullivan Theater in 1992.

== Production origins ==
Dreamtime is an adaptation of several of Cerrone's earlier works. Cerrone was invited to perform several outdoor concerts with laser lights, synchronized water fountains and fireworks commemorating national celebrations before audience of hundreds of thousands. The first, in 1978 was a show inside a plexiglass pyramid on the Pavilion for 1200 people. Over the next ten years the concerts developed more of a theme and narrative storyline.

In 1988 at the request of Paris’ Minister of Culture, Jack Lang, Cerrone conceived the mystical rock opera, The Collector. The Collector, featured musicians Mary Hopkins, Steve Overland and rock bands YES, Earth, Wind & Fire, The Art of Noise and The Paris Opera Choir and was performed on the Trocadero in Paris. The show was revised for the 1989 celebration of the Bicentenary of the French Revolution on the edges of the Seine for an audience of over 600,000. This show called Evolution featured musicians Laura Branigan and Steve Overland with a cast of 30 in the ensemble and choir.

Another version of the show, now called Harmony, starring Sonia Jones and Steve Overland, was performed before 800,000 people over the port of Tokyo. Harmony was produced to celebrate the launch of a new Japanese television satellite channel in high definition.

Cerrone and Broadway director David Niles had to rework the huge, spectacular outdoor concerts into a show that would fit into a 1200-seat theater. The result was the Broadway musical experience Dreamtime, again featuring Jones and Overland in the leads.

== Production history ==
During Dreamtime’s successful Broadway run at The Ed Sullivan Theater, Consolidated Properties, Inc sold the theater and the office space above to CBS to serve as the new home for the Late Show with David Letterman. CBS needed the theater immediately and struck a deal to move Dreamtime out of the theater. The show was given four weeks to vacate the theater and relocate. Due to the cost of moving the Broadway show and the lack of another comparable Broadway theater, the show closed permanently. The sale of the building and quick vacancy earned Brian Ezraty, the prestigious Henry Hart Rice Achievement Award for the Most Ingenious Deal of the Year for 1993. The show ran for 140 performances.

== Plot synopsis ==
Dreamtime is the story of a woman, a man and the power of love and dreams. A narrator introduces the characters in the story. The narrator is a voice and a vision which appears throughout the story in many forms. The character of “The Woman” represents all women. The character of “The Man” represents all men. “The Collector” is an omnipotent character who speaks through “The Witness” and gives the gift of “The Friend”. “The Collector” urges the audience to take a journey. He explains that many people live a lifetime and never realize their dreams. He asks that the audience travel into “Dreamtime” and help “the Women” and “The Man” to find their dream in one evening. “The Collector” warns the chorus and the audience to beware of “The Chief” who only sees life in black and white and wants people to only to dream while they sleep but not to pursue dreams in their daily life.

In the beginning of the show, the loneliness of “The Woman” and the longing of “The Man” are heard through their music. “The Man” is tempted by a fan and dreams of love. He is given the gift of friendship and with the help of the audience sees the love of “the Women” The audience is videotaped upon entering the theater and are incorporated into the projections during the finale hence, the cast and the audience become One.

== Musical numbers/songs in this production ==
- Prelude: The Players are introduced
- Solitude: The Woman's Loneliness
- Inquisition: The Chorus reveal their disbelief in Dreams
- Invitation: The Witness explains the power of Dreams
- What Hit You: The Man's Song of material conquest
- The Challenge: The Man and the Woman discover each other
- Never Give Up: The Man and the Woman discover love
- The Temptation: The Chorus pulls The Man back with them
- Steve's Dream: The Man is swayed by the Chorus in dreams
- I'm Not Sleeping: The Woman's Dream
- The Contract: The Chief and the Chorus reveal their real world
- The Power: The Woman attempts to reason with The Chief
- Friendship: The Collector offers a gift- The Friend
- The Calm: The power of Dream
- Building A Temple: The Man and The Woman sing about hope
- The Vision: The people see the power of Dream in themselves
- Harmony: The Man discovers a new world
- Finale: The cast and the audience become One

== Opening night cast ==
- Eddie Bracken - Chief
- Sonia Jones - Woman
- Steve Overland - Man
- Ivy Seine - Lioness
- Telly Bisone - Witness
- Bonnie Comley - Man's Fan
- Stephanie Daniels - Friend
- Glenn Weiner - Friend
- Carol Platz - Friend
- Martin Pfefferkorn - Friend
- Mami Katoh - Friend
- Beth Boltuch - Chorus/Ensemble
- Frank Cava - Chorus/Ensemble
- Cynthia Clark - Chorus/Ensemble
- Mindy Cooper - Chorus/Ensemble
- Dan Larrinaga - Chorus/Ensemble
- Elizabeth Mozer - Chorus/Ensemble
- Susan Campochiaro - Chorus /Ensemble

=== HDTV video cast ===
- Deirdre Coleman, Natcha Perard, Camille Donatacci, Jordi Caballero, David Elder, Suzanne Phillips, Anne-Brigitte Sirois, Tira.
