= Dream (disambiguation) =

A dream is a succession of images, ideas, emotions, and sensations that usually occur involuntarily in the mind during certain stages of sleep.

Dream may also refer to:

== Art ==
=== Paintings ===
- The Dream (Detaille), 1888, by Édouard Detaille
- The Dream, a painting by Salvador Dalí
- The Dream (Rousseau), by Henri Rousseau
- The Dream (Tamara de Lempicka), 1927, by Tamara de Lempicka
- The Dream (The Bed), 1940

=== Sculptures ===
- The Dream, a 2008 work by Damien Hirst, a simulated unicorn in a tank of formaldehyde solution
- The Dream (sculpture), a 1998 outdoor bronze of Martin Luther King, Jr. by Michael Florin Dente in Portland, Oregon
- Dream (sculpture), a 2009 public art work by Jaume Plensa in Sutton, St Helens, Merseyside

== Books ==
- "A Dream", 1924 short story by W. Somerset Maugham
- "The Dream", a Hercule Poirot short story by Agatha Christie in the 1960 collection The Adventure of the Christmas Pudding
- Dream (character), in The Sandman
- "The Dream" (Dafydd ap Gwilym poem), 14th century
- "The Dream" (John Donne poem), 1635
- "The Dream" (Lord Byron poem), 1816
- The Dream (novel), by H. G. Wells
- "The Dream" (short story), 1832, by Mary Shelley
- The Dreme, 1528 poem by Scottish poet David Lyndsay
- "Dream" (Taras Shevchenko poem), 1844 poem by Ukrainian poet Taras Shevchenko

== Film and TV ==
=== Films ===
- The Dream (1911 film), an American short film
- The Dream (1920), a Vitagraph short starring Alice Calhoun
- The Dream (1931 film), a French film directed by Jacques de Baroncelli
- The Dream (1964 film), a Soviet Ukrainian film about Taras Shevchenko
- The Dream (1966 film), a Yugoslavian war film
- The Dream (1985 film), directed by Pieter Verhoeff
- The Dream (1987 film), a Syrian documentary
- The Dream (1989 film), a television film starring Jeremy Irons
- Dream (2008 film), a South Korean film
- Dream (2012 film), an Indian Telugu-language thriller
- Dream (2023 film), a South Korean sports drama

=== Television ===
==== Series ====
- Dream (TV series), a South Korean TV drama
- The Dream with Roy and HG, an Australian talk show

==== Episodes ====
- "The Dream", a 1989 episode of Agatha Christie's Poirot
- "The Dream", a 2013 episode of The Amazing World of Gumball season 2
- "Dream", a 1997 episode of Where the Heart Is

==== TV related companies ====
- Dream Multimedia, makers of the Dreambox satellite TV receiver
- Dream Satellite TV, a defunct satellite TV provider in the Philippines

== Gaming ==
- Dream (YouTuber), an American YouTuber and Minecraft player
- Project Dream, an unreleased video game, redeveloped as Banjo-Kazooie

== Music ==
=== Artists ===
- D:Ream, a Northern Irish pop and dance group
- Dream (American group), a pop girl group
- Dream (Japanese group), a pop girl group
- Dream (rapper) (born 1974), Finnish rapper better known as Petri Nygård
- The-Dream (born 1977), American R&B artist
- NCT Dream, a South Korean-Chinese boy group and subunit of NCT

=== Albums ===
- Dream, by Jaclyn Victor, 2002
- Dream, by Michelle Tumes, 2001
- Dream (Ai album), 2022
- The Dream (alt-J album), 2022
- Dream (Angie Stone album), 2015
- Dream (Captain & Tennille album), 1978
- The Dream (The Favors album), 2025
- The Dream (In This Moment album), 2008
- The Dream (John & Audrey Wiggins album), 1997
- Dream (Keller Williams album), 2007
- Dream (Kitarō album), 1992
- Dream (Lebo Mathosa album), 2000
- Dream (Michael Bublé album), 2002
- The Dream (Open Hand album), 2003
- The Dream (The Orb album), 2007
- Dream (Roland Hanna album), 2002
- The Dream (Sanctus Real album), 2014
- Dream (TrueBliss album), 1999
- Dream (Yuna Ito album), 2009
- The Dream 1973–2011, a 2012 compilation album by Michael Franks
- The Dream (George Duke album), 1978
- Dream (Cliff Richard and the Shadows EP), 1961
- Dream (Jeong Eun-ji EP), 2016
- Dream (Seventeen EP), 2022
- Dream (Dreamcar EP), 2024

=== Songs ===
- "Dream" (1944 song), a 1944 jazz and pop standard written by Johnny Mercer
- "Dream" (Dizzee Rascal song), 2004
- "Dream" (Lisa song), 2025
- "Dream" (Suzy and Baekhyun song), 2016
- "Dream" (Taeyeon song), 2023
- "Dreams" (The Cranberries song), the debut single of the Cranberries
- "Dreams" (Fleetwood Mac song), by Fleetwood Mac from their album Rumours
- "Dream" (Forest for the Trees song), 1997
- "The Dream" (Roko Blažević song), 2019 song that represented Croatia in the Eurovision Song Contest 2019
- "The Dream (Hold On to Your Dream)", by Irene Cara, 1983
- "D.R.E.A.M.", 2019, by Miley Cyrus
- "Dream", by Anza
- "Dream", by Babymonster from their EP Babymons7er
- "Dream", by Chris Brown from Breezy
- "Dream", by Golden Earring from Winter-Harvest
- "Dream", by Imagine Dragons from Smoke + Mirrors
- "Dream", by Mami Kawada from Savia
- "Dream", by Miley Cyrus from the soundtrack Hannah Montana: The Movie
- "Dream", by Tally Hall from Marvin's Marvelous Mechanical Museum
- "Dream", by OneRepublic from Oh My My
- "Dream", by P. Lion
- "Dream", by Priscilla Ahn from her album A Good Day
- "Dream", by Shawn Mendes from Wonder
- "Dream", by White Lion from Return of the Pride
- "Dreams", by Kep1er from their EP Troubleshooter
- "Dream, Dream", by Kissng the Pink (KTP) from Certain Things Are Likely
- "The Dream", by Broken Spindles from Fulfilled/complete
- "The Dream", by The Moody Blues from On the Threshold of a Dream
- "This Dream", by David Rolfe, opening of Pokémon: Advanced Challenge, the seventh season of the Pokémon anime, 2004
- "Dream Song", by Joe Satriani from Black Swans and Wormhole Wizards
- "Dream Song", by John Fogerty from John Fogerty
- "Dream Song", by Scott Matthews from Passing Stranger
- "D.R.E.A.M.", by JoJo Siwa

=== Other uses in music ===
- The Dream (ballet), 1964, premiered by the Royal Ballet
- Dream (musical), a 1997 stage show

== Programs ==
- DREAM Act, an American legislative proposal related to immigration
- DREAM Drug Resource Enhancement against Aids and Malnutrition, an AIDS therapy program

== Science and technology ==
- DREAM complex, protein in cell-cycle gene regulation
- DREAM (protocol), a location-based routing protocol
- DREAM (software), a computer programming tool
- HTC Dream, a smartphone
- Project DReaM, a digital rights management implementation
- Sophomore's dream, a pair of mathematical identities discovered in 1697 by Johann Bernoulli

== Sports ==
- Hakeem Olajuwon (born 1963), nicknamed "The Dream", a Nigerian-American basketball player
- Dream (mixed martial arts)
- Atlanta Dream, an American women's basketball team

== Transportation and vehicles ==
=== Air and space ===
- Airdrome Dream Classic, a model of aircraft
- Antonov An-225 Mriya, cargo aircraft frequently referred to under its translated name "Dream"
- Firefly Alpha "Dream", flight 1 mission and rocket of Firefly Alpha on 3 September 2021; see List of Firefly Alpha launches

=== Road ===
- Honda Dream (disambiguation), various models of Honda motorcycles
- Voyah Dream, a Chinese minivan

=== Ships ===
- Dream, a cruise ship built in 1970, now sailing as the MS Formosa Queen
- Disney Dream, a 2010 cruise ship operated by Disney
- Dream-class cruise ship, a cruise ship class operated by Carnival
  - Carnival Dream, the lead vessel of the class

== Other uses ==
- Dream (chocolate bar), a candy bar

== See also ==
- A Dream (disambiguation)
- Dreams (disambiguation)
- Dream FM (disambiguation)
- Andria "Dreamz" Herd, a Survivor contestant
- Dreamer (disambiguation)
- Dreaming (disambiguation)
- Dream Team (disambiguation)
- Dreamy (disambiguation)
- Le Rêve (disambiguation) ('The Dream' in French)
- The Dreamer (disambiguation)
- The Dreamers (disambiguation)
- Wish, a hope or desire for something
