= AC15 =

AC-15 may refer to:

- AC-15, the IEC Utilization categories indicating the type of electrical load
- Autovía AC-15, a Spanish highway in the province of A Coruña, Galicia
- Honda AC15, a retro style single cylinder motorcycle
- USS Brutus (AC-15), former steamer Peter Jebsen, a collier in the US Navy
- Vox AC15, the first guitar amplifier designed by Vox
