= Oneiric =

Oneiric most commonly refers to:

- Dreams, during sleep
- Oneirology, the science of dreams

Oneiric may also refer to:

- Oneiric (film theory), dreams as a metaphor for film—or in critiques thereof
- Oneiric (album), 2006, by Boxcutter
- Oneiric Diary (EP), 2020, by IZ*ONE
- Oneiric Gardens, a 2014 adventure video game
- Oneiric Ocelot, a 2011 Ubuntu operating system

== See also ==
- Dream (disambiguation)
- Dreamy (disambiguation)
- Oneirism or daydreaming
- Oneiros, in Greek mythology
- Oneiromancy, dream-based divination
