= Bad Dream =

A bad dream is a nightmare.

Bad Dream(s) may refer to:

== Books and comics ==
- Bad Dreams (Winnick comics), 2014 series by Gary Winnick
- Bad Dream: A Dreamer Story, 2024 graphic novel by Nicole Maines and Rye Hickman
- Bad Dreams, 1896 novel by Fyodor Sologub
- Bad Dreams, 1990 novel by Kim Newman

== Film and TV ==
- Bad Dreams (film), 1988
- "Bad Dreams" (The Wire), 2003
- "Bad Dreams" (Fringe), 2009

== Music ==
=== Albums ===
- Bad Dream, by Dimmi Argus, 2013
- Bad Dreams (Ike Turner album), 1973
- Bad Dreams (Swollen Members album), 2001
- Bad Dreams, by Amazing Blondel, 1976

=== Songs ===
- "Bad Dream" (song), by the Jungle Giants, 2017
- "Bad Dream", by Exo from the 2018 album Don't Mess Up My Tempo
- "Bad Dreams" (song), by Teddy Swims, 2024
- "Bad Dreams", by Joni Mitchell from the 2007 album Shine

== Other uses ==
- Bad Dreams Records, a record label owned by Iggy Azalea

== See also ==
- "A Bad Dream", 2007 song by Keane
- Bad Dreems, Australian alternative rock band active from 2011–2026
- "Good Dreams", 2004 album by the Pillows
- Dream (disambiguation)
- Dreams (disambiguation)
