= Dreamy =

Dreamy may refer to:

== Albums ==
- Dreamy (Beat Happening album), 1991
- Dreamy (Sarah Vaughan album), 1960

== Songs ==
- "Dreamy", an oft-covered jazz song by Erroll Garner
- "Dreamy", a song in the 1972 comedy film The Return of the Pink Panther
- "Dreamy", a 1982 song on A Distant Shore (album) by Tracey Thorn

== Television ==
- "Dreamy" (Once Upon a Time), an episode of the American drama series

== See also ==
- Dream (disambiguation)
- Dreamies, a 1974 collage album, an early use of sampling
- Oneiric (disambiguation)
