= Lists of rocket launches =

This is a list of all the lists of rocket launches. That is, a list of articles that are lists of rocket launches.

== Lists of rocket launches by rocket ==
- List of Antares launches
- List of Ariane launches
- List of Atlas launches
- List of Black Brant launches
- List of Delta I launches
- List of Delta II launches
- List of Delta IV launches
  - List of Delta IV Medium launches
  - List of Delta IV Heavy launches
- List of Electron rocket launches
- List of failed Thor and Delta launches
- List of Falcon 9 and Falcon Heavy launches
  - List of Falcon 9 and Falcon Heavy launches (2010–2019)
  - List of Falcon 9 and Falcon Heavy launches (2020–2022)
  - List of Falcon 9 and Falcon Heavy launches (2023)
  - List of Falcon 9 and Falcon Heavy launches (2024)
- List of Firefly Alpha launches
- List of H-II series and H3 launches
- List of Launch Services Program launches
- List of Long March launches
- List of Minotaur launches
- List of New Glenn launches
- List of Proton launches
- List of PSLV launches
- List of R-7 launches
- List of Starship launches
- List of Thor and Delta launches
- List of Titan launches
- List of V-2 test launches
- List of Vega Launches
- List of Zenit launches

== Lists of rocket launches by type ==
- List of Amazon Leo launches
- List of failed Thor and Delta launches
- List of NRO launches
- List of USSF launches
- List of V-2 test launches
- Space jellyfish

== Lists of rocket launches by location ==
- List of Satish Dhawan Space Centre launches

== List of launches by outcome ==
List of failed Thor and Delta launches

== See also ==
- Lists of rockets
- List of rocket launch sites
  - V-1 flying bomb facilities
- Timeline of spaceflight
