= Dream State (disambiguation) =

Dream State is a British musical group.

Dream State or Dreamstate may also refer to:

- "Dream State", a song by 311 from Voyager
- "Dream State", a song by Kamasi Washington from Fearless Movement
- Dreamstate, an album by Kelly Lee Owens

== See also ==
- Dream (disambiguation)
