= Takeoff =

Phase of flight in which a vehicle leaves the land or water surface

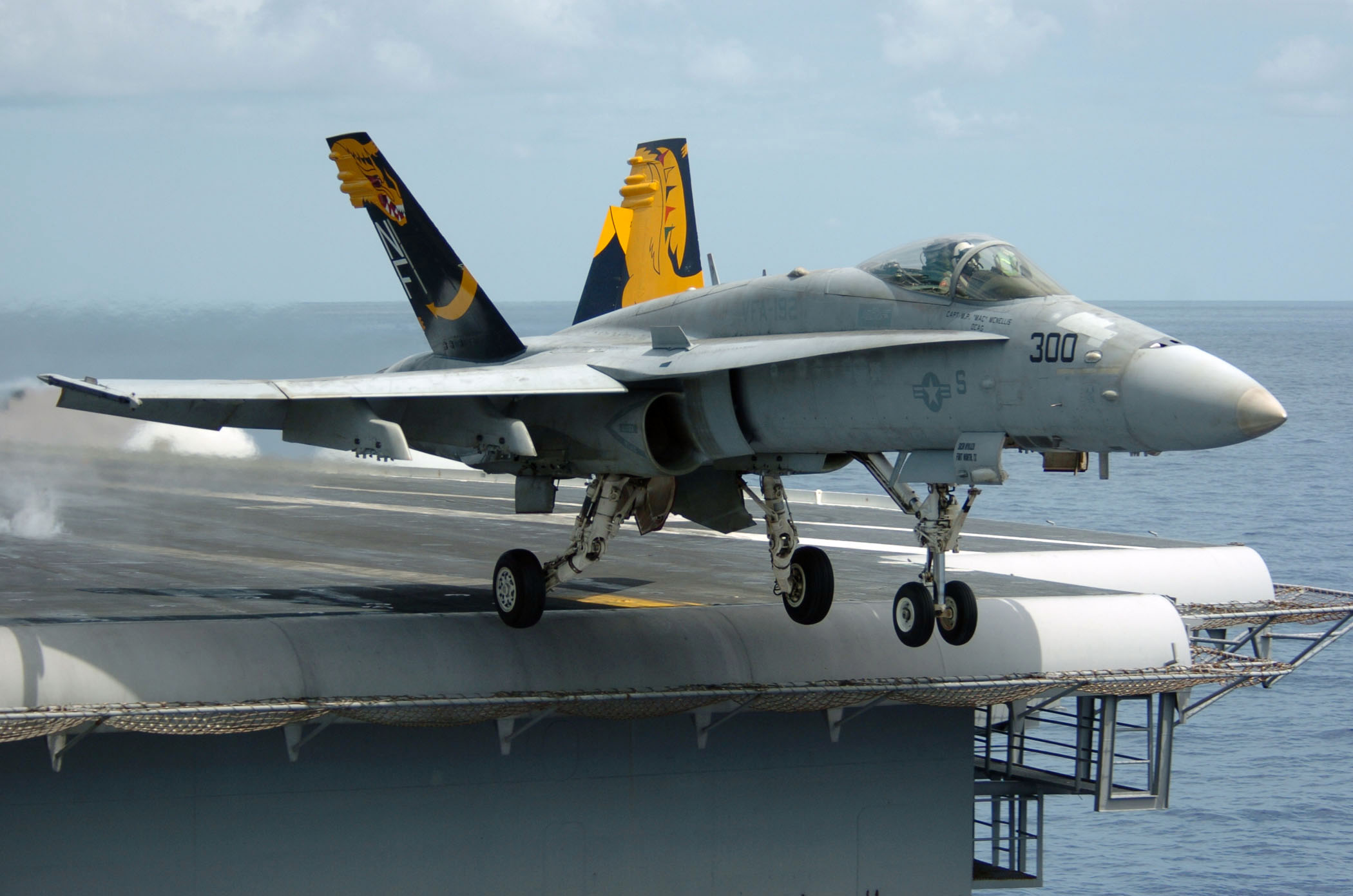
An F/A-18 taking off from an aircraft carrier

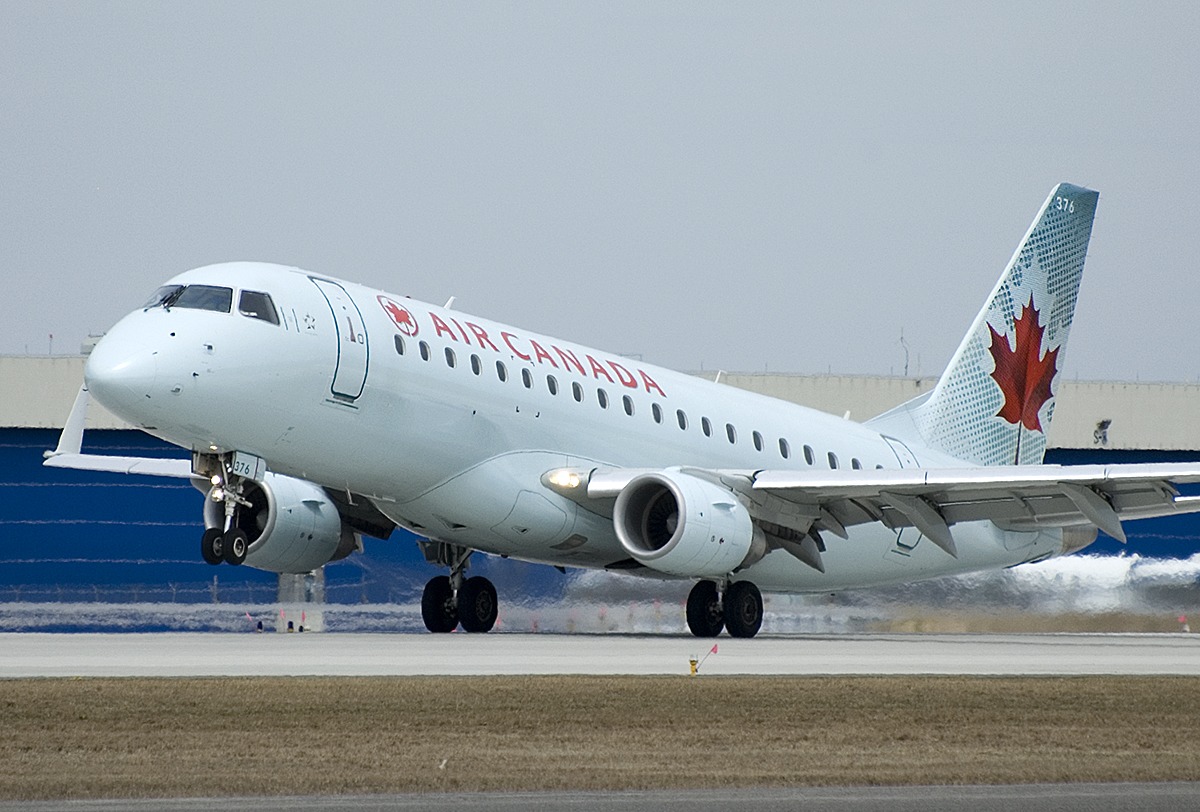
An Embraer E175 taking off

Takeoff or take-off is the phase of flight during which an aerial vehicle leaves the ground and becomes airborne. For space vehicles that launch vertically, this is known as liftoff.

For fixed-wing aircraft that take off horizontally (conventional takeoff), this usually involves an accelerating ground run (known as the roll) on a runway to build up speed so the wings can generate enough lift. For aerostats (balloons and airships), helicopters, tiltrotors (e.g. the V-22 Osprey) and thrust-vectoring STOVL fixed-wing aircraft (e.g. the Harrier jump jet and F-35B), a helipad/STOLport is sufficient and no runway is needed.

== Horizontal ==
=== Power settings ===
For light aircraft, full power is usually used during takeoff. Large transport category (airliner) aircraft may use a reduced power for takeoff, where less than full power is applied in order to prolong engine life, reduce maintenance costs and reduce noise emissions. In some emergency cases, the power used can then be increased to increase the aircraft's performance. Before takeoff, the engines, particularly piston engines, are routinely run up at high power to check for engine-related problems. The aircraft is permitted to accelerate to rotation speed (often referred to as V_{r}). The term rotation is used because the aircraft pivots around the axis of its main landing gear while still on the ground, usually because of gentle manipulation of the flight controls to make or facilitate this change in aircraft attitude (once proper air displacement occurs under / over the wings, an aircraft will lift off on its own; controls are to ease that in).

The nose is raised to a nominal 5°–15° nose up pitch attitude to increase lift from the wings and effect liftoff. For most aircraft, attempting a takeoff without a pitch-up would require cruise speeds while still on the runway.

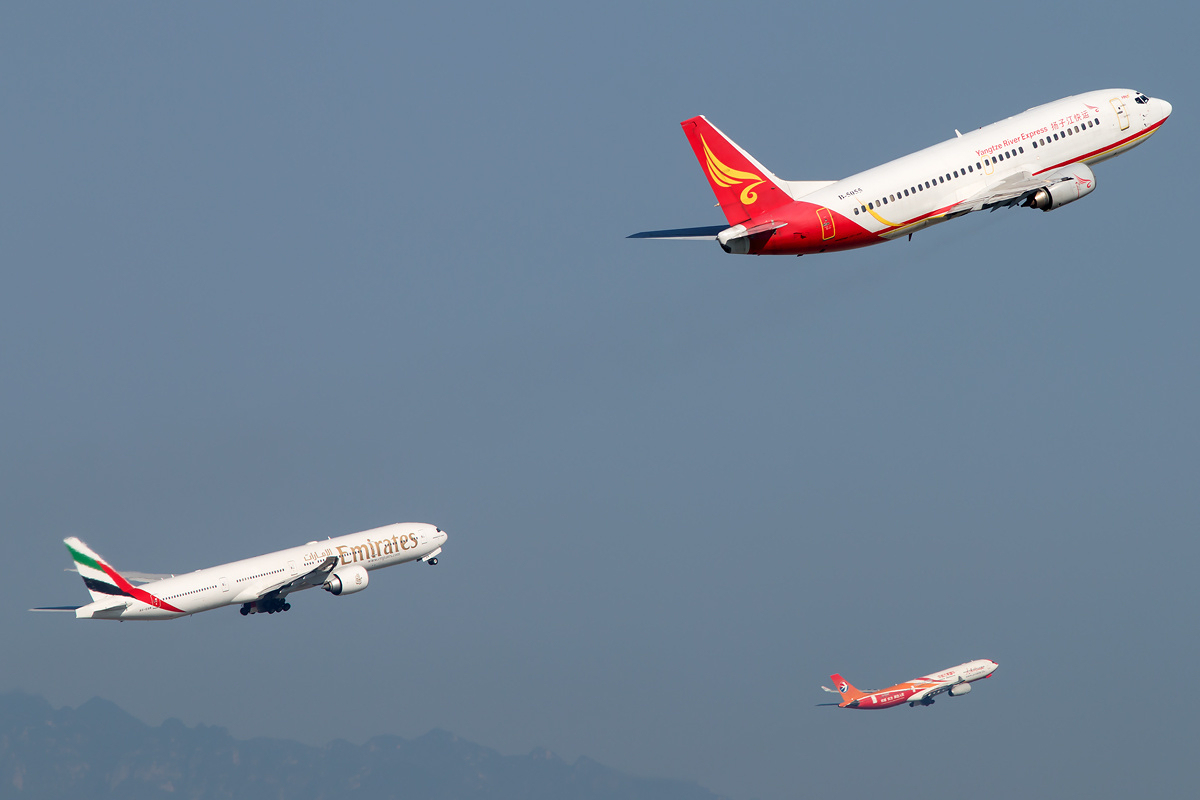
Three airliners taking off simultaneously (note similar pitch attitudes)

Fixed-wing aircraft designed for high-speed operation (such as commercial jet aircraft) have difficulty generating enough lift at the low speeds encountered during takeoff. These are therefore fitted with high-lift devices, often including slats and usually flaps, which increase the camber and often area of the wing, making it more effective at low speed, thus creating more lift. These are deployed from the wing before takeoff, and retracted during the climb. They can also be deployed at other times, such as before landing.

=== Required speeds ===
Operations with transport category aircraft employ the concept of the takeoff V-speeds: V_{1}, V_{R} and V_{2}. These speeds are determined not only by the above factors affecting takeoff performance, but also by the length and slope of the runway and any peculiar conditions, such as obstacles off the end of the runway. Below V_{1}, in case of critical failures, the takeoff should be aborted; above V_{1} the pilot continues the takeoff and returns for landing. After the co-pilot calls V_{1}, they will call V_{R} or "rotate," marking speed at which to rotate the aircraft. The V_{R} for transport category aircraft is calculated such as to allow the aircraft to reach the regulatory screen height at V_{2} with one engine failed. Then, V_{2} (the safe takeoff speed) is called. This speed must be maintained after an engine failure to meet performance targets for rate of climb and angle of climb.

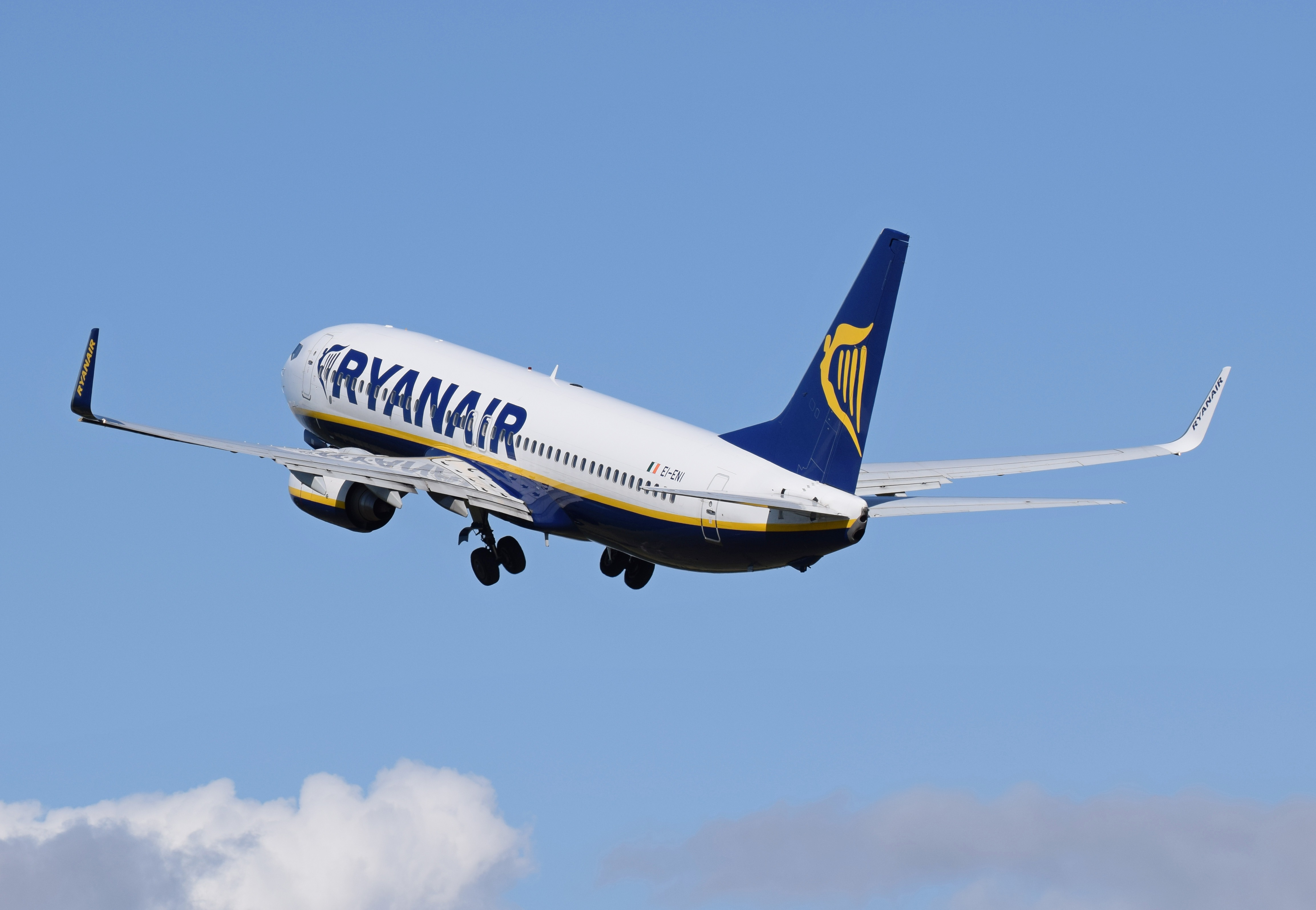
A Boeing 737-800 retracting its undercarriages during takeoff

In a single-engine or light twin-engine aircraft, the pilot calculates the length of runway required to take off and clear any obstacles, to ensure sufficient runway to use for takeoff. A safety margin can be added to provide the option to stop on the runway in case of a rejected takeoff. In most such aircraft, any engine failure results in a rejected takeoff as a matter of course, since even overrunning the end of the runway is preferable to lifting off with insufficient power to maintain flight.

If an obstacle needs to be cleared, the pilot climbs at the speed for maximum climb angle (V_{x}), which results in the greatest altitude gain per unit of horizontal distance travelled. If no obstacle needs to be cleared, or after an obstacle is cleared, the pilot can accelerate to the best rate of climb speed (V_{y}), where the aircraft will gain the most altitude in the least time. Generally speaking, V_{x} is a lower speed than V_{y}, and requires a higher pitch attitude to achieve.

The speeds needed for takeoff are relative to the motion of the air (indicated airspeed). A headwind will reduce the ground speed needed for takeoff, as there is a greater flow of air over the wings. Typical takeoff air speeds for jetliners are in the range of 240–285 km/h (130–154 kn; 149–177 mph). Light aircraft, such as a Cessna 150, take off at around 100 km/h (54 kn; 62 mph). Ultralights have even lower takeoff speeds. For a given aircraft, the takeoff speed is usually dependent on the aircraft weight; the heavier the weight, the greater the speed needed. Some aircraft are specifically designed for short takeoff and landing (STOL), which they achieve by becoming airborne at very low speeds.

=== Assistance ===
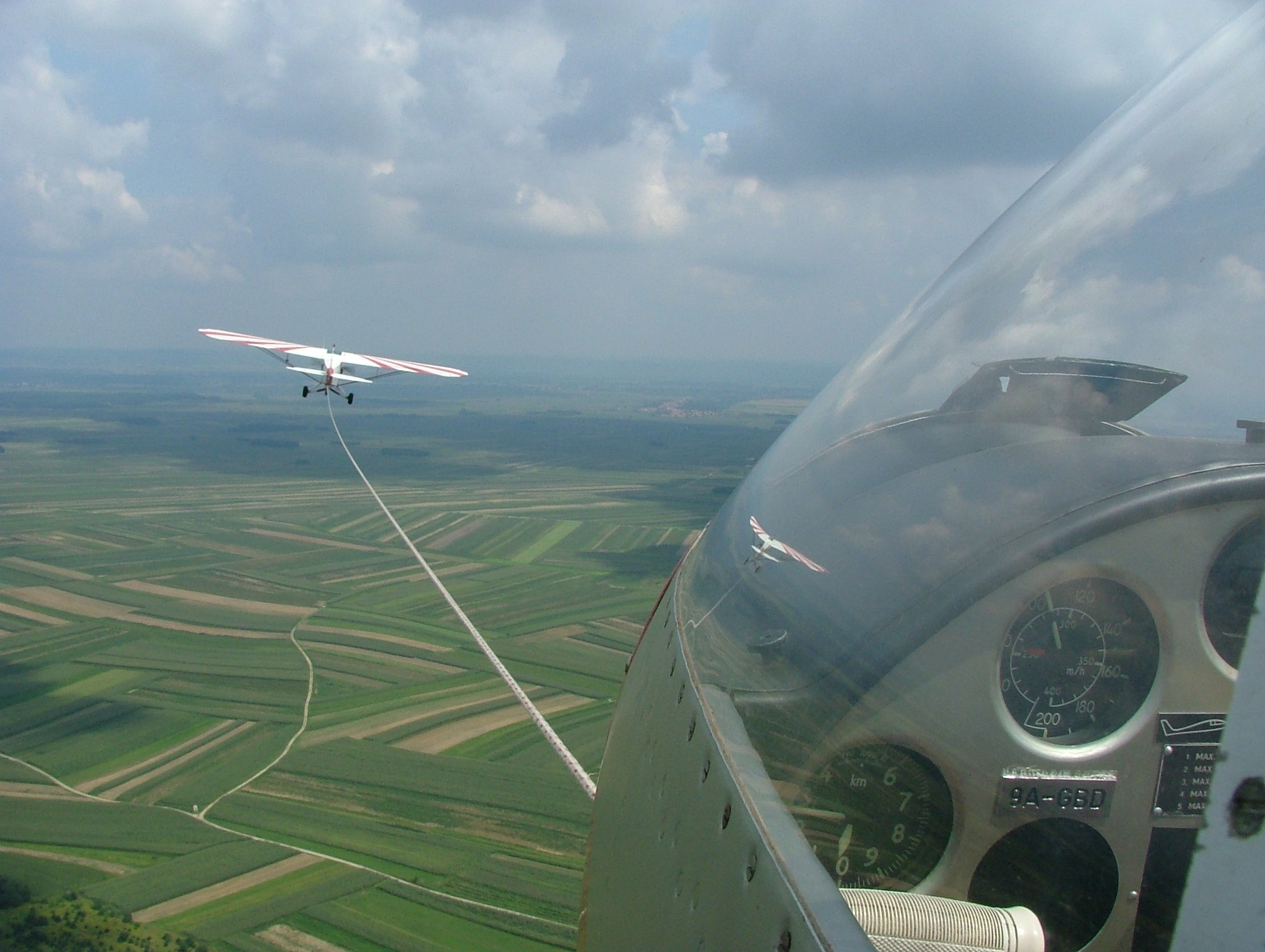
Tow line and towing aircraft seen from the cockpit of a glider

Assisted takeoff is any system for helping aircraft into the air (as opposed to strictly under its own power). The reason it might be needed is due to the aircraft's weight exceeding the normal maximum takeoff weight, insufficient power, or the available runway length may be insufficient, or a hot and high airfield, or a combination of all four factors. Assisted takeoff is also required for gliders, which do not have an engine and so are unable to take off by themselves. Hence assisted takeoff is required.

== Vertical ==
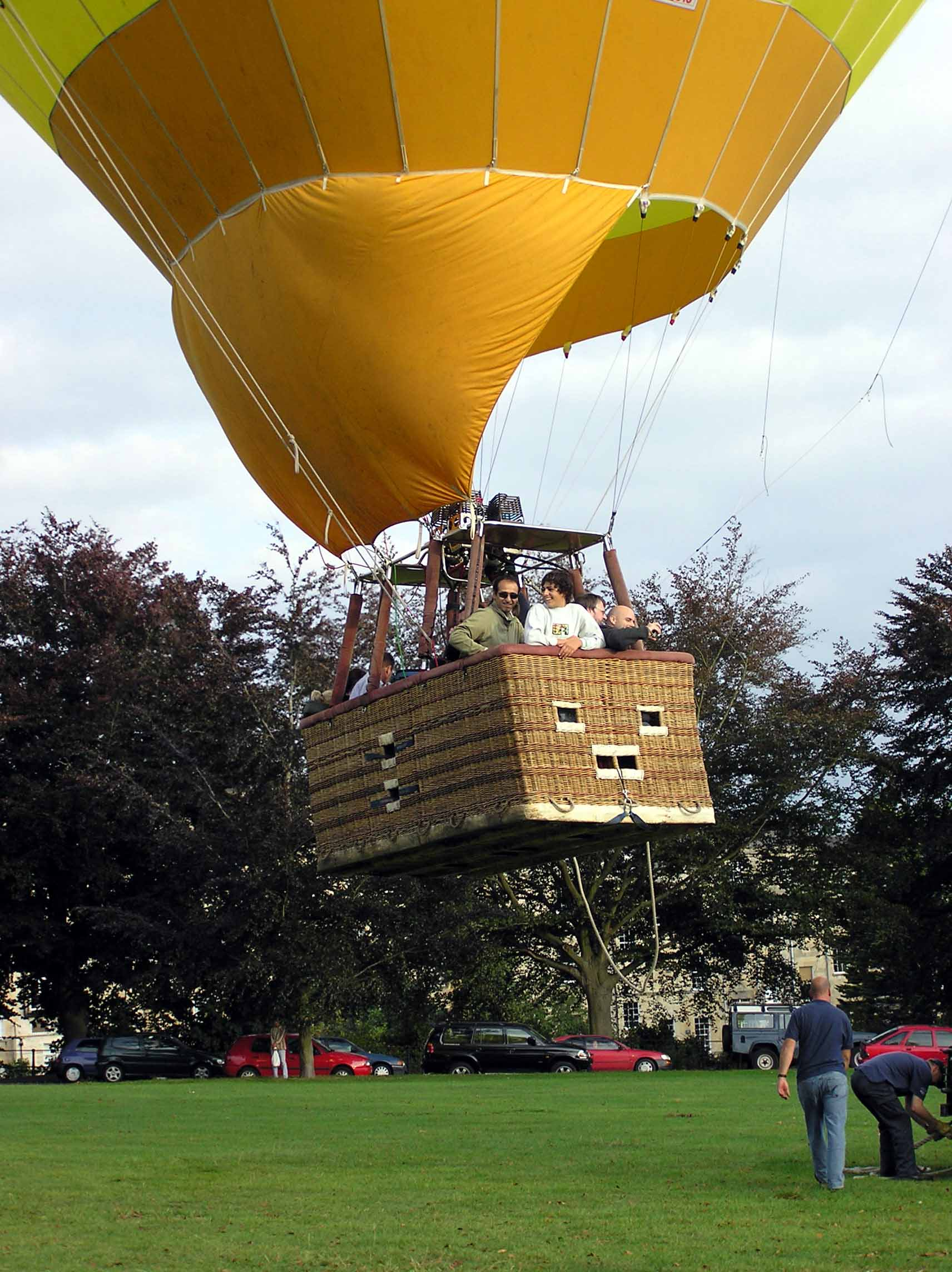
A hot air balloon taking off

Vertical takeoff refers to aircraft or rockets that take off in a vertical trajectory. Vertical takeoff eliminates the need for airfields. Most vertical take off aircraft are also able to land horizontally, but there were certain rocket-powered aircraft of the Luftwaffe that only took off vertically, landing in other ways. The Bachem Ba 349 Natter landed under a parachute after having taken off vertically. Other late projects developed in Nazi Germany, such as the Heinkel P.1077 Julia or the Focke-Wulf Volksjäger 2, climbed to their ceiling at a nearly vertical angle and landed later on a skid.

=== VTOL ===
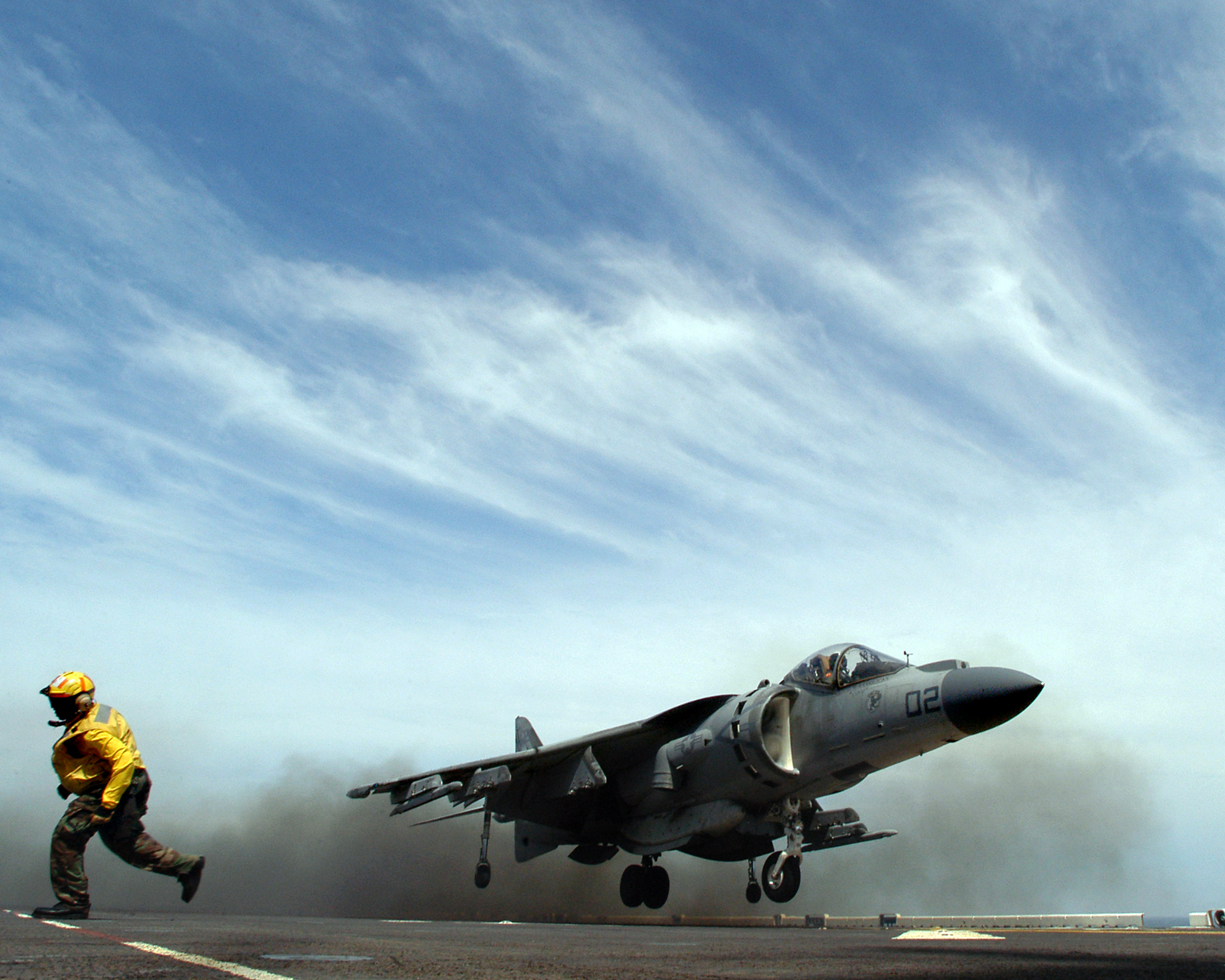
The Harrier jump jet, a VTOL aircraft

Vertical take-off and landing (VTOL) aircraft include fixed-wing aircraft that can hover, take off and land vertically as well as helicopters and other aircraft with powered rotors, such as tiltrotors. Some VTOL aircraft can operate in other modes as well, such as CTOL (conventional take-off and landing), STOL (short take-off and landing), and/or STOVL (short take-off and vertical landing). Others, such as some helicopters, can only operate by VTOL, due to the aircraft lacking landing gear that can handle horizontal motion. VTOL is a subset of V/STOL (vertical and/or short take-off and landing).

Besides the helicopter, there are two types of VTOL aircraft in military service: craft using a tiltrotor, such as the Bell Boeing V-22 Osprey, and some aircraft using directed jet thrust such as the Harrier family.

=== Rocket launch ===
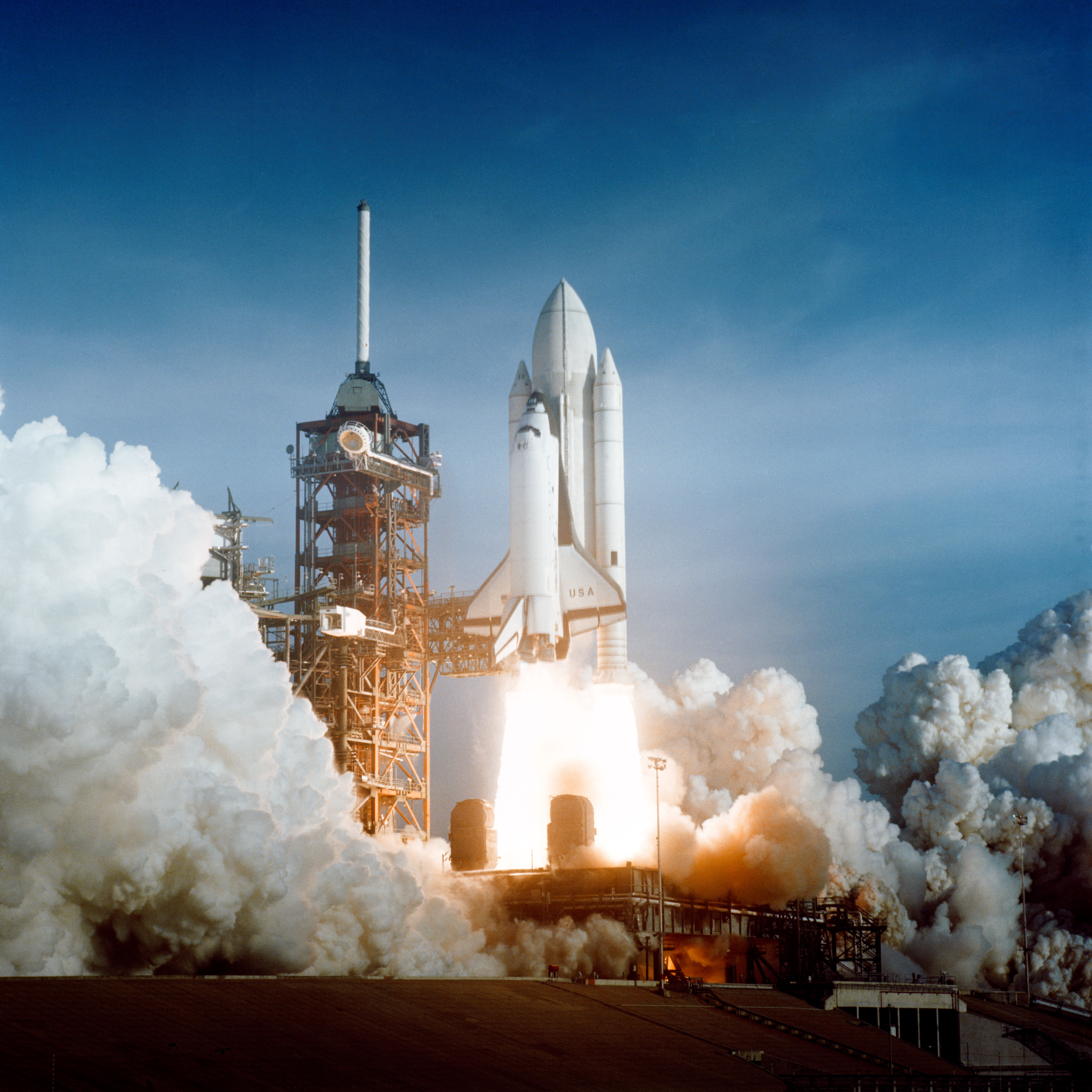
Space Shuttle Columbia in the process of lifting off from the launch pad during STS-1

The takeoff phase of the flight of a rocket is called "rocket launch". Launches for orbital spaceflights, or launches into interplanetary space, are usually from a fixed location on the ground, but may also be from a floating platform such as the San Marco platform, or the Sea Launch launch vessel. Lists of rocket launches can be seen here.

== See also ==
- Index of aviation articles
- Balanced field takeoff
- V speeds
