= Autovía AC-15 =

Autovía AC-15
- Autovía de Acceso al Puerto Exterior de La Coruña

Route information
- Length: 6.5 km (4.0 mi)

Major junctions
- From: AG-55 (Pastoriza)
- To: A Coruña External Port

Location
- Country: Spain

Highway system
- Highways in Spain; Autopistas and autovías; National Roads

The Autovía AC-15 or Autovía de Acceso al Puerto Exterior de La Coruña is a Spanish autovía located in the province of A Coruña, Galicia. It connects the Autopista AG-55 with A Coruña External Port, and has a length of 6.5 km.

The autovía was opened in June 2016, and its construction had a cost of €83.6 million. It is administrated by the Government of Spain.
