= Dreams (disambiguation) =

Dreams are successions of images, ideas, emotions, and sensations that usually occur involuntarily in the mind during certain stages of sleep.

Dreams or The Dreams may also refer to:

== Film and TV ==
=== Films ===
- Dreams (1955 film), a Swedish drama film directed by Ingmar Bergman
- Dreams (1990 film), a Japanese magical realism film directed by Akira Kurosawa
- Dreams (1993 film), a 1993 Russian absurdist comedy
- Dreams (2000 film), an Indian Malayalam-language film
- Dreams (2004 film), an Indian Tamil-language romance
- Dreams (2005 film), an India Hindi film
- Dreams (2006 film), an Iraqi film
- Dreams (2016 film), a Nepali film
- Dreams (Sex Love), a 2024 Norwegian film by Dag Johan Haugerud
- Dreams (2025 film), a 2025 film directed by Michel Franco
- Dreams (2016), an Indonesian film with music by Elwin Hendrijanto

=== Television ===
- Dreams (TV series), an American sitcom
- "Dreams" (Don't Hug Me I'm Scared), a 2016 episode
- "Dreams" (M*A*S*H), a 1980 episode
- "Dreams" (Quantum Leap), a 1991 episode

== Gaming ==
- Dreams (1997), the PlayStation port of PC game Dreams to Reality
- Dreams (video game), a game developed by Media Molecule for PlayStation 4
- DREAMS, the codename for Hololive Dreams

== Music ==
=== Artists ===
- The Dreams, a Faroese punk rock group
- Dreams (band), an American jazz rock group
- Dreams, duo between Daniel Johns and Luke Steele

=== Albums ===
- Dreams (The Allman Brothers Band album), 1989
- Dreams (EP), by We Came as Romans, 2008
- Dreams (Evermore album), 2004
- Dreams (Fra Lippo Lippi album), 1992
- Dreams (Gábor Szabó album), 1968
- Dreams (Grace Slick album), 1980
- Dreams (Klaus Schulze album), 1986
- Dreams (Miz album), 2005
- Dreams (Neil Diamond album), 2010
- Dreams (Philip Bailey album), 1999
- Dreams (The Whitest Boy Alive album), 2006
- Dreams (With Pollutions When Virile), a 2001 album by Oneiroid Psychosis
- Dreams: The Ultimate Corrs Collection, a 2006 album by The Corrs
- Dreams, by 2 Brothers on the 4th Floor, 1994
- Dreams, by Susan Jacks, 1975
- Dreams, by Toad, 1975
- The Dreams, the first in the Inventions for Radio series by Delia Derbyshire and Barry Bermange, 1964

=== Songs ===
- “Dreams” (Solange song), 2019
- "Dreams" (Beck song), 2015
- "Dreams" (The Cranberries song), 1992
- "Dreams" (Diana DeGarmo song), 2004
- "Dreams" (Fleetwood Mac song), 1977, covered by Wild Colour, the Corrs, and Deep Dish
- "Dreams" (Gabrielle song), 1993
- "Dreams" (The Game song), 2005
- "Dreams" (High and Mighty Color song), 2007
- "Dreams" (Smokin Beats song), 1997
- "Dreams" (Van Halen song), 1986
- "Dreams" (Will Come Alive), a 1994 song by 2 Brothers on the 4th Floor
- "Dreams", by All Saints from the album Saints & Sinners
- "Dreams", by The Allman Brothers Band from the album The Allman Brothers Band
- "Dreams", by Ashanti from the self-titled album
- "Dreams", by Aurora from the album What Happened to the Heart?
- "Dreams", by Bazzi from the album Cosmic
- "Dreams", by Brandi Carlile from the album Give Up The Ghost
- "Dreams", by Dua Lipa from the album Dua Lipa
- "Dreams", by Enya from the British motion picture The Frog Prince
- "Dreams", by Fra Lippo Lippi from the album Dreams
- "Dreams", by Jade Bird from the album Who Wants to Talk About Love?
- "Dreams", by John Legend from the album Love in the Future
- "Dreams", by King's X from the album Black Like Sunday
- "Dreams", by King Gizzard & the Lizard Wizard from the album Butterfly 3000
- "Dreams", by Kings of Tomorrow
- "Dreams", by The Kinks from Percy
- "Dreams", by The Kooks from the album Listen
- "Dreams", by Kylie Minogue from the album Impossible Princess
- "Dreams", by Lil Wayne from the album Funeral
- “Dreams”, by NF from the album Perception
- "Dreams", by The Soft Boys. A bonus track from the 1990 reissue of the album Underwater Moonlight
- "Dreams", by Taproot from the album Welcome
- "Dreams", by Taylor Dayne from the album Naked Without You
- "Dreams", by TV on the Radio from the album Desperate Youth, Blood Thirsty Babes
- "Dreams", by Uriah Heep from the album Wonderworld
- "Dreams", by Lynsey de Paul from the album Love Bomb
- "Träume" ("Dreams" in German), by Richard Wagner from the composition Wesendonck Lieder
- "Dreams", a song from the soundtrack of Ballroom, performed by Lynn Roberts

== Other uses ==
- Dreams (novella), a 1904 novella by Ivan Bunin
- Dreams (bed retailer), based in the UK
- Dreams (painting), an 1860 painting by Jozef Israëls

== See also ==
- Dream (disambiguation)
  - § See also
