= A Dream =

A Dream may refer to:

== Literature ==
- A Dream (novel) or Somnium, by Johannes Kepler, 1634
- "A Dream" (Blake poem), by William Blake, 1789
- "A Dream" (Poe poem), by Edgar Allan Poe, 1827
- "A Dream" (short story), by Franz Kafka

== Music ==
- A Dream (album), by Max Romeo, 1969
- "A Dream" (Common song), 2006
- "A Dream" (DeBarge song), 1983
- "A Dream", a song from The Blueprint 2: The Gift & The Curse, 2002, by Jay-Z

== See also ==
- Dream (disambiguation)
