= Honda Dream =

Honda Dream may refer to any of the following Honda motorcycles:

- D-Type (1949), Honda's first complete motorcycle
- C71, C76, C72, C77 Dream (1960–1967)
- Dream CB250 (1968–1969)
- Super Cub EX5 Dream (1986–), a.k.a. Honda Astrea, or Dream 110i (2011– )
- AC15 or Dream 50 (1997–1998)
- Dream Yuga (2012– )
- Honda Dream C125 (2000–) Cambodia, Burma
