= Dream Team (disambiguation) =

Dream Team is the nickname of the United States men's national basketball team that competed at the 1992 Summer Olympics in Barcelona, Spain.

Dream Team or The Dream Team may also refer to:

== Sport ==
=== Basketball ===
- Dream Team II, the 1994 U.S. men's national basketball team at the FIBA World Championship
- Dream Team III, the 1996 United States men's Olympic basketball team in Atlanta

=== Baseball ===
- The 2026 United States men's baseball team for the World Baseball Classic

=== Volleyball ===
- Iran men's national sitting volleyball team

=== Football ===
- FIFA World Cup Dream Team, an all-time all-star theoretical football team published by FIFA after a poll in 2002
- The Santos FC squad of the 1959-1974 era was known as the "Dream Team"
- The FC Barcelona squad of the 1991-1994 era was known as the "Dream Team"

=== Miscellaneous ===
- AFL Dream Team, an online fantasy football competition for supporters run by the Australian Football League
- An Australian rules football team called the "Dream Team" represented the States and territories of Australia outside Victoria in the AFL Hall of Fame Tribute Match
- Super League Dream Team, award for players in the European rugby Super League

== Arts, entertainment, and media ==
=== Films ===
- The Dream Team (1989 film), a 1989 American comedy film
- Dream Team (1999 film), a 1999 gay pornographic film, produced by Studio 2000
- The Dream Team (2012 film), a 2012 French film
- Dream Team (2026 film), a Czech sports comedy film

=== Music ===
- Dreamteam, South African hip hop musical group
- The Dream Team (album), a 1997 album by Jimmy McGriff
- Dream Team, a 2014 album by Froggy Fresh

=== Television ===
==== Series and programming blocks ====
- Dream Team (TV series), a British television series
- CBS Dream Team, a children's television programming block on CBS

==== Episodes ====
- "The Dream Team" (Craig of the Creek), an episode of Craig of the Creek
- "Dream Team" (The Office), an episode of the American television series The Office
- "The Dream Team" (Entourage), an episode of Entourage

=== Other uses ===
- Dream Team, a trio of Minecraft YouTubers consisting of Dream, Sapnap, and GeorgeNotFound
- Dream Team (comics), a fictional group of Marvel Comics superheroes
- Mario & Luigi: Dream Team, a 2013 video game for the Nintendo 3DS
- Sonic Dream Team, a 2023 Apple Arcade video game
- A fictional basketball team led by Bill Russell appearing on the TV special Goin' Back to Indiana
- The Dream Team (professional wrestling), professional wrestling tag-team in the World Wrestling Federation 1985–1987

== Law ==
- Dream Team (law), nickname for the legal defense team in the O. J. Simpson murder case
