= Pastoriza =

Pastoriza is a surname. Notable people with the name include:

- Agustín Pastoriza (born 1966) Argentine footballer
- Benita Martínez Pastoriza (1819–1890), First Lady of Argentina
- Benito Pastoriza Iyodo (1954–2022), Puerto Rican author
- Fernando Pastoriza (born 1965), Argentine athlete
- José Omar Pastoriza (1942–2004), Argentine footballer
- Joseph Jay Pastoriza (1857–1917), American businessman and Mayor of Houston, Texas
- Juan Manuel Pastoriza (died 1896), Cuban baseball player
- Miriani Griselda Pastoriza (born 1939), Argentine-born Brazilian astronomer
- Roberto Pastoriza (died 1961), engineer in the Dominican Republic

== See also ==
- A Pastoriza, a municipality in the Spanish province of Lugo
