= Ben Campbell (Houston mayor) =

Mayor of Houston, Texas (1858–1942)

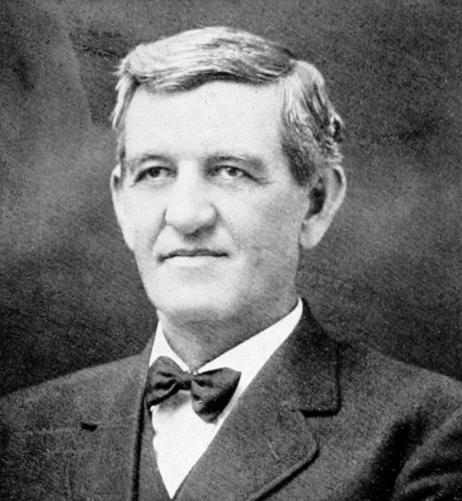

39th Mayor of Houston
- In office 1913–1917
- Preceded by: Horace Baldwin Rice
- Succeeded by: Joseph Jay Pastoriza

Personal details
- Born: Benjamin S. Campbell; July 27, 1858 Marengo County, Alabama, U.S.
- Died: March 19, 1942 (aged 83) Houston, Texas, U.S.
- Spouse: Ella Smither (m. 1883)
- Children: 6
- Profession: Attorney

Benjamin S. Campbell (July 27, 1858 – March 19, 1942) was an attorney and a mayor of Houston, Texas.

== Early life ==
Benjamin S. Campbell was born on July 27, 1858, to Farquhar and Gabriella Singleton Campbell in Marengo County, Alabama. (Note: Some sources list his birthplace as Montgomery County.) He moved with his family to Walker County, Texas, around 1859.

== Career ==
Campbell did not attend law school, but served as a legal apprentice in the law offices of Abercrombie & Randolph, a firm based in Huntsville, Texas. The Texas bar accepted him in 1882. He worked for local government, first as the Walker County Attorney and then as prosecutor for the Twelfth Judicial District of Texas. In 1890, he partnered with Thomas Ball to form a new law firm.

Campbell moved to Houston in 1883 and became a partner in the firm of Hutcheson, Campbell & Sears. In 1911, he was the senior partner with the firm Campbell, Myer and Myer.

Campbell advocated for the establishment of city parks including Hermann Park. He implemented reforms for city employees, including limiting hours of work. During his administration, Houston provided free textbooks for school children starting in 1913.

Campbell was mayor of Houston when the deepwater Port of Houston opened on November 10, 1914. Ceremonies took place at the Turning Basin, where lame duck Governor Oscar Colquitt and other Texas dignitaries watched the mayor's daughter christen the newly dredged channel with rose petals.

== Personal life ==
Campbell married Ella Smither on December 5, 1883. They had four sons and two daughters: Benjamin, Farquhar, Ella Campbell Myer, Robert, Wilbourn, and Sue Campbell Pillot.

Campbell was active in religious and fraternal organizations. He was a member of Holland Lodge Masons (No. 1), the Arabian Temple (Scottish Rite), the Knights Templar, and the Shriners' Temple. He was engaged with the First Methodist Church in Houston.

== Death ==
Campbell died in Houston on March 19, 1942. He is buried at Glenwood Cemetery in Houston.

== Bibliography ==
Sibley, Marilyn McAdams (1968). The Port of Houston. Austin: Texas University Press.

Political offices
Preceded by Horace Baldwin Rice	Mayor of Houston, Texas; 1913–1917	Succeeded by Joseph Jay Pastoriza
