= Dreams (painting) =

Painting by Jozef Israëls

- Dutch: Droomen, Italian: Dolce Far Niente
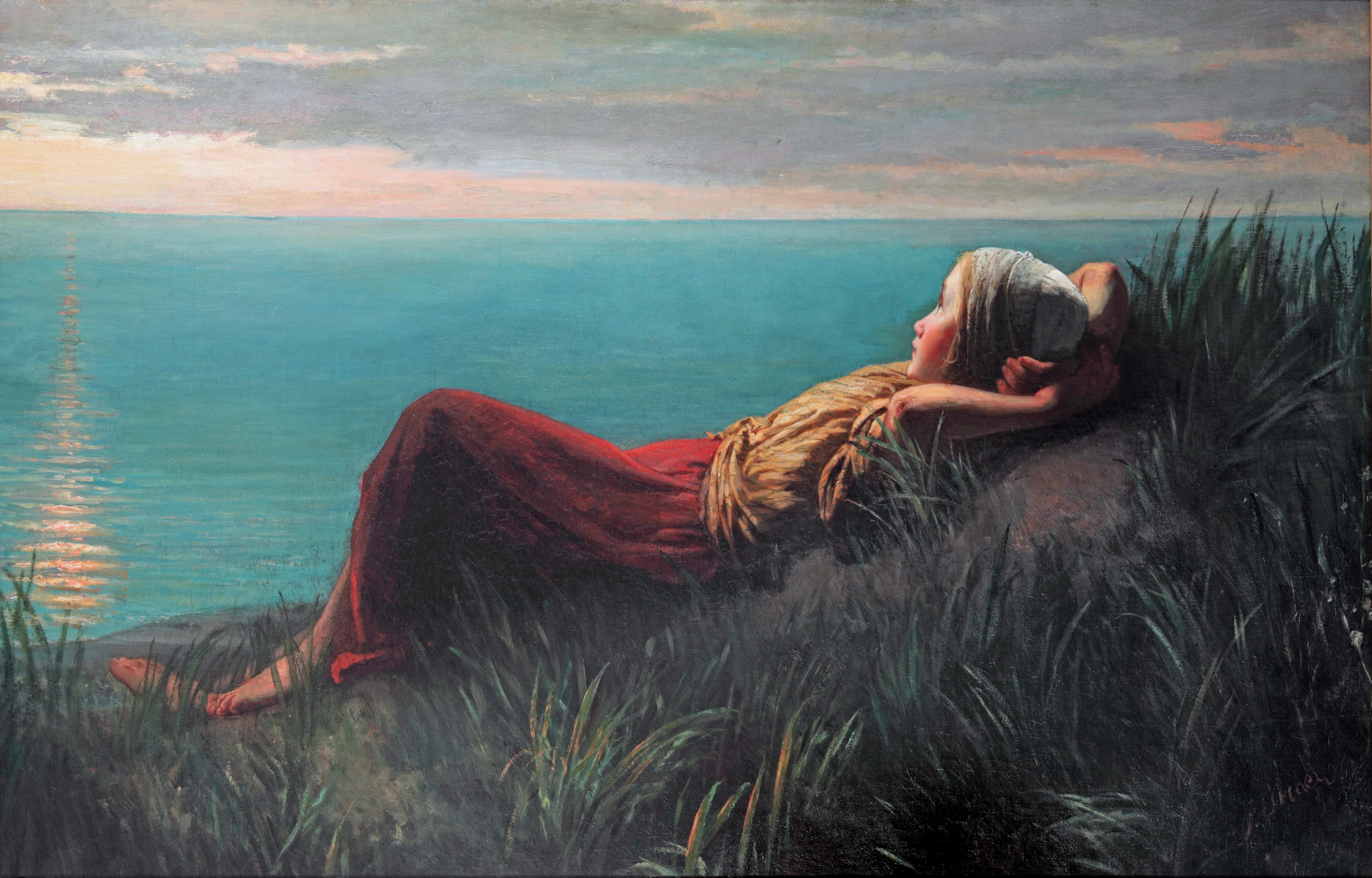
- Dreaming
- Artist: Jozef Israëls
- Year: 1872
- Medium: Oil-on-canvas
- Movement: Realism (arts)
- Subject: Leisure
- Dimensions: 128.5 cm (50.6 in) x 201.2 cm (79.2 in)
- Owner: Private collection

Dreams (Dutch: Droomen) is an 1860 oil-on-canvas painting by Dutch artist Jozef Israëls. The painting is a depiction of peasant girl lying near the ocean. The painting was sold in 1860 and it was not seen again until 1927 when a private buyer bought it from Gimbels. The painting did not appear again until it was auctioned by Sotheby's in 2013.

== History ==
Israëls first exhibited the painting in 1859 at The Hague with the title Droomen (Dreams). The painting has had many different titles including Dolce far niente, Rêverie, Dreams of Youth and Castles in the Air. The whereabouts of the painting were unknown for many years. After 1860 the painting was not displayed until it surfaced in 1927 in a display at Gimbel Brothers in Philadelphia. it was purchased from Gimbels by a private collector for US$5000 in 1927.

In 1859 art critic Théophile Thoré-Bürger who wrote for Gazette des Beaux-Arts described the original size of the painting and when it was auctioned by Sotheby's they determined that part of the painting was cut away on the left-hand side of the canvas after its 1860 exhibition. The preauction estimate was US$100.000 - 150.000 and it was sold for US$293,000 on May 9, 2013.

== Description ==
The painting shows a young girl resting with her back on a sand dune and her hands behind her head. She looks toward the sea with the setting Sun casting rays on the waves.

== Reception ==
In 1859 writing for Gazette des Beaux-Arts art critic Théophile Thoré-Bürger said the painting, "stood above all" and he was impressed by the realism in the painting. In 2015 the Dordrechts Museum in Dordrecht had an exhibit entitled Holland at its best – Spring of the Hague School. 'Dreams' by Jozef Israels, was called one of the "icons of the exhibition.
