= The Dream (Donne poem) =

"The Dream" is a poem by the metaphysical poet John Donne. It was first printed in 1633, two years after Donne's death.
