= Dream FM =

Dream FM may refer to:

- Dream FM (Leeds), a former pirate radio station in Leeds, United Kingdom
- Dream FM (London), a former pirate radio station based in London, United Kingdom
- Dream FM Network, a former radio network based in the Philippines
- Dream 100, a radio station broadcasting in Colchester, United Kingdom
- Chelmsford Radio, known until February 2009 as "Dream 107.7 FM"
