= DREAM (protocol) =

DREAM is an ad hoc location-based routing protocol. DREAM stands for Distance Routing Effect Algorithm for Mobility.
