= Dream Team (2026 film) =

2026 Czech sports comedy film

- Directed by: Jonáš Karásek
- Written by: Petr Kolečko
- Story by: Jakub Prachař
- Produced by: Petra Brocková; Juraj Brocko; Jakub Prachař
- Starring: Martin Hofmann; Jakub Prachař; Petra Brocková
- Cinematography: Martin Žiaran
- Music by: Jiří Burian
- Distributed by: CinemArt
- Release date: 1 January 2026 (Czech Republic)
- Running time: 127 minutes
- Countries: Czech Republic; Slovakia
- Language: Czech
- Box office: 35,731,643 CZK

Dream Team is a 2026 Czech sports comedy film directed by Jonáš Karásek. It premiered on 1 January 2026. The screenplay was written by Petr Kolečko and based on a story by Jakub Prachař, who is also the film's producer (along with Petra Brocková and Juraj Brock) and also stars in it. The main role is played by Martin Hofmann. The film also stars: Sara Sandeva, Petra Polnišová, Miroslav Krobot, Robin Ferro and others. It is the first Czech film that premiered in 2026.

== Plot ==
Marek, a basketball coach, is disappointed after falling to lead his team to promotion to the second national league. His son Simon, who has an intellectual disability, dreams of representing his country in basketball at the Paralympic Games. Seeking to help fulfill his son's ambition, Marek attempts to assemble a team eligible for Paralympic competition but struggles to recruit enough qualified players. His neighbor Daniel, a theater director, proposes a scheme in which able-bodied players poses as athletes with intellectual disabilities in order to qualify for the Paralympics. Marek reluctantly agrees, and the team advances to the Paralympic Games in Rio de Janeiro. As the deception becomes increasingly difficult to maintain, Marek begins to confront the ethical and personal consequences of the plan.

== Cast ==
- Martin Hofmann as coach Marek Popel
- Jakub Prachař as theater director Daniel
- Martin Polišenský as Šimon Popel, Mark's son
- Petra Brocková as Jana Popelová, Mark's wife
- Radek Lajfr as Jakub Popel, Mark's son
- Oldřich Navrátil as Zdeněk Popel, Mark's father
- Sara Sandeva as referee Hanka, Jakub's girlfriend
- Miroslav Krobot as Radek Jouza, Mark's friend and head of the Paralympics
- Robin Ferro as Vilém, actor and member of the team
- Bekim Aziri
- Filip Teller
- Petr Komínek
- Jan Rogos
- Jakub Louda
- Ondřej Plachetka
- Ondřej Malý
- Adam Petzuch
- Michal František Stránský
