= Dreamies =

Studio album by Bill Holt
- Released: 1973
- Genre: Avant garde, sound collage, experimental pop
- Length: 52:00.
- Label: Stone Theater Productions
- Producer: Bill Holt

Dreamies (subtitled Auralgraphic Entertainment) is an experimental music album by Bill Holt, released in 1973. It is a collage of songs performed on guitar and synthesizer (a Moog Sonic Six) combined with snippets of found sound. The album consists of two long tracks (originally one on each side of the record) called "Program 10" and "Program 11", a reference to the Beatles' "Revolution #9". Dreamies includes excerpts of radio and television broadcasts as well as snippets taken from recordings by the Beatles. In its use of "sound bites" (recorded on tape), the album anticipated the use of sampling in later popular music.

AllMusic's Stanton Swihart described Dreamies as "one of the finest pieces of experimental pop from the era."

== Derivation ==
"Dreamies" is a term coined by Isaac Asimov in 1955 in a short story called "Dreaming is a Private Thing". It refers to manufactured dream sequences.

== Track listing ==
=== Side One ===
1. "Program Ten" (Subtitled "Song and sound collage combine to recapture the joy and anxiety of past experience") 26:10

=== Side Two ===
1. "Program Eleven" (Subtitled "Leave your favorite listening spot and embark on a lively holiday of the mind") 26:15
