= List of failed Thor and Delta launches =

This is a list of failed launches of rockets in the Thor and Delta rocket family. The Thor and Delta family rockets have had 51 complete failures, 10 partial failures, and 1 partial success, for a total of 62 unsuccessful Thor and Delta family missions. Since it has had 768 launches, this gives it a reliability of 91.9%, which puts it within the average range for rockets that started around the space age.

== Launch attempts ==
The data in this table comes from in addition to the references listed within the table.
=== 1957-1959 ===								
Date/Time (UTC)	Rocket	S/N	Launch site	Payload	Function	Orbit	Outcome	Remarks
1957-01-26	Thor DM-18	Thor 101	CCAFS LC-17B		Missile test	Suborbital	Failure	Maiden flight of Thor, first launch from LC-17. Contaminated LOX caused loss of thrust at liftoff. Vehicle fell back onto the pad and exploded.
1957-04-20; 04:33	Thor DM-18	Thor 102	CCAFS LC-17B		Missile test	Suborbital	Failure	RSO sent a mistaken destruct command at T+35 seconds due to an incorrect console readout.
1957-08-30	Thor DM-18	Thor 104	CCAFS LC-17A		Missile test	Suborbital	Failure	
1957-10-03; 17:14	Thor DM-18	Thor 107	CCAFS LC-17A		Missile test	Suborbital	Failure	Stuck valve prevented the gas generator from starting. Missile fell back onto the pad and exploded.
1957-10-11; 16:33	Thor DM-18	Thor 108	CCAFS LC-17B		Missile test	Suborbital	Partial success	Turbopump failure at T+152 seconds. Flight considered a "partial success".
=== 1960-1969 ===
Date/Time (UTC)	Rocket	S/N	Launch site	Payload	Function	Orbit	Outcome	Remarks
1960-02-04; 18:51:45	Thor DM-18 Agena-A	Thor 218; Agena 1052	VAFB LC-75-3-4	Discoverer 9	Reconnaissance	LEO	Failure	Premature Thor cutoff. Agena could not attain orbital velocity.
1960-02-19; 20:15:14	Thor DM-18 Agena-A	Thor 223; Agena 1054	VAFB LC-75-3-5	Discoverer 10	Reconnaissance	LEO	Failure	Thor flight control malfunction. RSO T+52 seconds.
1960-05-13; 09:16:05	Thor DM-19 Delta	Thor 144; Delta 1	CCAFS LC-17A	Echo 1	Communication	MEO	Failure	Maiden flight of Thor-Delta, upper-stage attitude control system malfunctioned
1960-06-29; 22:00:44	Thor DM-18 Agena-A	Thor 160; Agena 1053	VAFB LC-75-3-4	Discoverer 12	Reconnaissance	LEO	Failure	Agena attitude control malfunction.
1960-08-18; 19:58	Thor DM-21 Ablestar	Thor 262; Ablestar 004	CCAFS LC-17B	Courier 1A	Communications	LEO	Failure	Premature first stage cutoff. RSO T+150 seconds.
1960-10-26; 20:26	Thor DM-21 Agena-B	Thor 253; Agena 1061	VAFB LC-75-3-4	Discoverer 16	Reconnaissance	LEO	Failure	Maiden flight of Thor-Agena B. Agena staging failed. Vehicle fell into the Pacific Ocean.
1960-11-30; 19:50	Thor DM-21 Ablestar	Thor 283; Ablestar 006	CCAFS LC-17B	Transit 3A; GRAB-2 (Solrad-2)	Navigation; ELINT	LEO	Failure	Premature Thor cutoff. RSO. Debris fell in Cuba.
1961-03-30; 20:34:43	Thor DM-21 Agena-B	Thor 300; Agena 1105	VAFB LC-75-3-4	Discoverer 22	Reconnaissance	LEO	Failure	Agena control failure.
1961-06-08; 21:16	Thor DM-21 Agena-B	Thor 302; Agena 1108	VAFB LC-75-3-4	Discoverer 24	Reconnaissance	LEO	Failure	Agena power failure
1961-07-21; 22:35	Thor DM-21 Agena-B	Thor 322; Agena 1110	VAFB LC-75-3-4	Discoverer 27	Reconnaissance	LEO	Failure	Open circuit in guidance computer led to loss of control and vehicle breakup at T+60 seconds.
1961-08-04; 00:01	Thor DM-21 Agena-B	Thor 309; Agena 1111	VAFB LC-75-1-1	Discoverer 28	Reconnaissance	LEO	Failure	Agena control system malfunctioned
1961-10-23; 19:23	Thor DM-21 Agena-B	Thor 329; Agena 1116	VAFB LC-75-3-5	Discoverer 33	Reconnaissance	LEO	Failure	Agena hydraulics failure
1961-11-05; 20:00	Thor DM-21 Agena-B	Thor 330; Agena 1117	VAFB LC-75-1-1	Discoverer 34	Reconnaissance	LEO	Failure	Incorrect guidance program left the satellite in a useless orbit.
1962-01-13; 21:41	Thor DM-21 Agena-B	Thor 327; Agena 1120	VAFB LC-75-3-4	Discoverer 37	Reconnaissance	LEO	Failure	Agena restart burn failed.
1962-01-24; 09:30	Thor DM-21 Ablestar	Thor 311; Ablestar 010	CCAFS LC-17B	LOFTI-2A; SECOR; GRAB-4 (Solrad 4); Injun 2 SURCAL 1	Technology; Geodesy; ELINT; Ionospheric; Calibration	LEO	Failure	Second stage insufficient thrust
1962-02-21; 18:44	Thor DM-21 Agena-B	Thor 332; Agena 2301	VAFB LC-75-3-5	FTV 2301	ELINT	LEO	Partial failure	Upper stage failed to restart for circularization burn
1962-05-10; 12:06	Thor DM-21 Ablestar	Thor 314; Ablestar 011	CCAFS LC-17B	ANNA 1A	Geodesy	LEO	Failure	Second stage failed to ignite
1962-06-04; 09:44:17	Thor DSV-2E	Thor 199	Johnston LE-1	Bluegill	Nuclear test	Suborbital	Failure	Radar contact lost 5 minutes after launch. RSO destruct command sent.
1962-06-20; 08:46:16	Thor DSV-2E	Thor 193	Johnston LE-1	STARFISH	Nuclear test	Suborbital	Failure	RVs caused turbine exhaust gas to enter the thrust section, overheating and weakening the engine mounts. Engine broke loose and ruptured the propellant tanks T+59 seconds. Warhead destroyed by RSO T+65 seconds.
1962-07-26; 09:13:53	Thor DSV-2E	Thor 180	Johnston LE-1	Bluegill Prime	Nuclear test	Suborbital	Failure	Stuck LOX valve caused loss of thrust and fire on the launch stand. Range Safety Officer destroyed the missile and warhead. Launch area extensively contaminated with plutonium.
1962-10-16 09:14:38	Thor DSV-2E	Thor 156	Johnston LE-2	Bluegill Double Prime	Nuclear test	Suborbital	Failure	Flight control failure T+85 seconds. RSO T+156 seconds.
1963-02-28; 21:48	TAT SLV-2A Agena-D	Thor 354; Agena 1159	VAFB LC-75-3-5	OPS 0583	Reconnaissance	LEO	Failure	Maiden flight of Thrust-Augmented Thor Agena. One SRB failed to ignite and subsequently separate from the vehicle, resulting in loss of control and self-destruct T+127 seconds.
1963-03-18; 21:13	TAT SLV-2A Agena-D	Thor 360; Agena 1164	VAFB LC-75-3-4	OPS 0627	Reconnaissance	LEO	Failure	Electrical short at staging causes loss of Agena control and no orbit.
1963-04-26; 20:13	Thor DM-21 Agena-D	Thor 372; Agena 1411	VAFB LC-75-1-1	OPS 1008	Reconnaissance	LEO	Failure	Attitude sensor alignment error results in no Agena orbit.
1963-11-09; 20:27:54	Thor SLV-2 Agena-D	Thor 400; Agena 1171	VAFB LC-75-1-2	OPS 2268	Reconnaissance	LEO	Failure	Loss of heat shield causes high thrust section temperatures. Control loss at T+113 seconds followed by propulsion system shutdown.
1964-03-19; 11:13:41	Delta B	Thor 391; Delta 24	CCAFS LC-17A	BE-A	Ionospheric	LEO	Failure	Third stage underperformed
1964-03-24; 12:15	Thor DSV-2G	Thor 240	CCAFS LC-17B	ASSET-2	REV test	Suborbital	Failure	Atmospheric flight, second stage fired intermittently, destroyed by range safety
1964-03-24; 22:22:48	TAT SLV-2A Agena-D	Thor 396; Agena 1175	Arguello LC-1-1	OPS 3467	Reconnaissance	LEO	Failure	Agena power failure. No orbit.
1964-04-21; 18:50	Thor DSV-2A Ablestar	Thor 379; Ablestar 014	VAFB LC-75-1-1	Transit 5BN-3; Transit 5E-4	Navigation	LEO	Failure	
1964-05-28; 07:32	Thor DSV-2J	Thor 227	Johnston LE-2		ASAT test	Suborbital	Failure	
1964-08-28; 07:56:57	Thor SLV-2 Agena-B	Thor 399; Agena 6201; TA-3	VAFB LC-75-1-1	Nimbus 1	Weather	LEO	Partial failure	Second-stage cutoff early during second burn
1964-10-04; 03:45:00	Delta C	Thor 392; Delta 26	CCAFS LC-17A	Explorer 21	Magnetospheric	HEO	Partial failure	Reached lower than planned orbit
1965-01-19; 05:03	Thor MG-18	Thor 224	VAFB SLC-10W	DMSP-3B-F1	Military weather satellite	planned: LEO / SSO	Partial failure	Maiden flight of the Thor-Burner series. Satellite failed to separate from the upper stage, but the satellite was able to operate for 6 months.
1965-09-02; 20:00	Thor DM-21 Agena-D	Thor 401; Agena 1602	VAFB LC-75-3-5	MPRV	Upper atmosphere and space experiments	planned: MEO	Failure	High winds caused the vehicle to drift off course. RSO T+43 seconds. Debris fell on a trailer park.
1966-01-08; 04:48	Thor Burner 1	Thor 251	VAFB SLC-10W	DMSP-3B-F5	Military weather satellite	planned: LEO / SSO	Failure	FW-4S second-stage motor failed to ignite.
1966-05-03; 19:25	TAT SLV-2A Agena-D	Thor 465; Agena 1625	VAFB LC-75-3-5	OPS 1508 (KH-4A #1032)	Reconnaissance	planned: LEO	Failure	Agena failed to separate from the Thor at staging. Vehicle fell into the Pacific Ocean.
1967-05-09; 21:50	Thorad SLV-2G Agena-D	Thor 508; Agena 1634	VAFB SLC-1E	KH-4A (S/N 1041)/SRV S/N 731	Reconnaissance	planned: LEO	Partial failure	Rocket failed to cut off, resulting in incorrect, but usable orbit
1968-05-18; 08:23	Thorad SLV-2G Agena-D	Thor 520; Agena 6221	VAFB SLC-2E	Nimbus B/EGRS-10	Weather Satellite / Geodesic research satellite	planned: LEO / SSO	Failure	Incorrectly installed yaw gyro led to loss of control. RSO T+101 seconds.
1968-09-19; 00:09	Delta M	Thor 529; Delta 59	CCAFS SLC-17A	Intelsat 3-1	Communication Satellite	planned: GTO	Failure	Pitch gyroscope failure led to loss of control starting at T+20 seconds. RSO T+110 seconds.
1969-07-26; 02:06	Delta M	Thor 547; Delta 71	CCAFS SLC-17A	Intelsat 3-5	Communication Satellite	planned: GTO	Partial failure	Stage 3 motor case ruptured, leaving spacecraft in unusable orbit
1969-08-27; 21:59	Delta L	Thor 540; Delta 73	CCAFS LC-17A	Pioneer E / TTS-3	Interplanetary space research probe / Technology demonstration satellite	planned: Heliocentric	Failure	Defective valve in Stage 1 caused a hydraulic fluid leak and loss of engine gimbaling at T+220 seconds, making it impossible for the second stage to reach orbit. RSO T+480 seconds.
=== 1970-1979 ===
Date/Time (UTC)	Rocket	S/N	Launch site	Payload	Function	Orbit	Outcome	Remarks
1970-04-24	Thor DSV-2J	Thor 225		Johnston LE-1	Satellite Inspection test	Suborbital	Failure	Thor rocket collided with the satellite.
1971-02-17; 20:04	Thorad SLV-2H Agena-D	Thor 537; Agena 1659	VAFB SLC-3W	KH-4B (S/N 1113)	Reconnaissance	LEO	Failure	Improper pre-flight procedure caused frozen lubricant to form a plug that resulted in complete turbopump failure 18 seconds after liftoff. The booster lost thrust and impacted the ground not far from the launch complex.
1971-10-21; 11:32	Delta N6	Delta 86; Thor 572	VAFB SLC-2E	ITOS-B	Weather Satellite	planned: LEO / SSO	Failure	2nd stage oxidizer leak starting at T+20 seconds. The attitude control system ran out of propellant trying to correct the stage's flight path and the launch vehicle reentered the atmosphere and broke up above the Arctic Circle.
1973-07-16; 17:10	Delta 300	Delta 96; Thor 578	VAFB SLC-2W	ITOS-E	Weather Satellite	planned: LEO / SSO	Failure	Hydraulic pump malfunction led to failure of the 2nd stage attitude control system. The booster and payload reentered the atmosphere and broke up.
1974-01-19; 01:38	Delta 2313	Delta 100; Thor 587	CCAFS SLC-17B	Skynet-2A	Military communication satellite	planned: GTO	Failure	First flight of the Delta 2000 series. Stage 2 electronics package short circuited (induced by a piece of conductive contaminant shaken loose during launch), leading to loss of control.
1976-02-19; 07:52	Thor Burner 2A	Thor 182	VAFB SLC-10W	DMSP-5C-F3	Military weather satellite	planned: LEO / SSO	Failure	Thor stage not loaded with enough kerosene fuel due to incorrect LR79 main engine data sheet entry. Satellite re-entered after one orbit.
1977-04-20; 10:15	Delta 2914	Delta 130; Thor 617	CCAFS SLC-17B	ESA-GEOS-1	Magnetosphere research satellite	planned: GTO	Partial failure	Premature separation of second and third stages led to failure of Stage 3 spin up.
1977-09-13; 23:21	Delta 3914	Delta 134; Thor 619	CCAFS SLC-17A	OTS-1	Experimental communication satellite	planned: GTO	Failure	Launch vehicle exploded at T+52 seconds due to a rupture of the SRM #1 casing.
1979-02-06; 08:46	N-I	N-5 (F)	Tanegashima SLC-N	ECS-A (Ayame 1)	Experimental communication satellite	planned: GTO	Failure	Recontact between satellite and upper stage.
=== 1980-1989 ===
Date/Time (UTC)	Rocket	S/N	Launch site	Payload	Function	Orbit	Outcome	Remarks
1980-07-15; 02:22	Thor DSV-2U	Thor 304	VAFB SLC-10W	DMSP-5D-F5	Military weather satellite	planned: LEO / SSO	Failure	Final flight of the Long Tank Thor. Failure attributed to faulty connection between second and third stages, resulting in third stage not receiving electrical power.
1986-05-03; 22:18	Delta 3914	178	CCAFS LC-17A	GOES-G	Weather Satellite	planned: GTO	Failure	Electric failure in first stage caused the rocket to lose control and was destroyed 90 seconds into flight
=== 1990-1999 ===
Date / time (UTC)	Rocket Configuration	Launch site	Payload	Payload mass	Orbit	Customer	Outcome	Remarks
5 August 1995; 11:10	Delta II 7925–9.5	CCAFS, LC-17B	Koreasat 1	711 kg	GTO	KT Corporation	Partial failure	Communications satellite, One SRB failed to separate, retarding the booster's orbital velocity. Spacecraft eventually reached correct orbit but with substantially shortened operational life.
January 17, 1997; 16:28	Delta II 7925–9.5	CCAFS LC-17A	GPS IIR-1	2,030 kg	Planned: MEO	US Air Force	Failure	Exploded 13 seconds after launch due to SRB failure. Navigation satellite
August 27, 1998; 01:17	Delta III 8930	CCAFS SLC-17B	Galaxy 10	700 kg	GTO	PanAmSat / Intelsat	Failure	Maiden flight of Delta III, Destroyed by range safety after control problems and depletion of hydraulic fluid, Communications satellite
May 5, 1999; 01:00	Delta III 8930	CCAFS SLC-17B	Orion 3	4,300 kg	GTO	Loral	Failure	Second stage engine failure. Payload placed into LEO, Communications satellite
=== Since 2000 ===
Date / time (UTC)	Rocket, Configuration	Launch site	Payload	Payload mass	Orbit	Customer	Launch outcome	Remarks
August 23, 2000; 11:05	Delta III 8930	CCAFS SLC-17B	DM-F3	4383 kg	GTO	US Air Force	Partial failure	Reached lower than planned orbit, final flight of Delta III, Demosat
December 21, 2004; 21:50	Delta IV Heavy	CCAFS SLC-37B	DemoSat / 3CS-1 / 3CS-2	>6020 kg	GSO (planned)		Partial failure	Demonstration payload, Payloads did not reach correct orbits, First Delta IV Heavy launch
