= Joseph Jay Pastoriza =

American entrepreneur and politician (1857–1917)

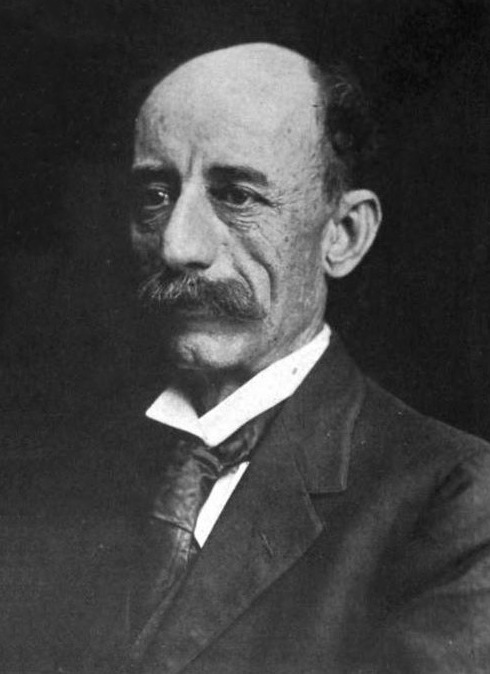

40th Mayor of Houston
- In office April 17, 1917 – July 9, 1917
- Preceded by: Ben Campbell
- Succeeded by: Joseph Chappell Hutcheson Jr.

Houston Tax Commissioner
- In office 1911–1917
- Preceded by: J.Z. Gaston

Personal details
- Born: January 8, 1857 New Orleans, Louisiana, U.S.
- Died: July 9, 1917 (aged 60) Houston, Texas, U.S.
- Spouse: Lula Girard (m. 1886)
- Children: Hugh Pastoriza
- Profession: Printer, real estate investor

Joseph Jay "J. J." Pastoriza (January 8, 1857 – July 9, 1917) was a printer, real estate investor, and politician in Houston, Texas. He served both as Houston's Tax Commissioner and Mayor. Pastoriza was the first Hispanic mayor of the city of Houston. Pastoriza was orphaned and adopted as a young child in Houston. He started working in the printing business at about age twenty before establishing his own stationery and print shop.

Pastoriza took an interest in public policy and politics after he retired from the printing business. He joined the Houston Single Tax League, and later traveled to study tax policy. Between 1911 and 1917 he served as Houston Tax Commissioner, establishing the Houston Single Tax Plan in 1912. Houston voters elected him Mayor of Houston in 1917. He served only three months before dying in office.

== Early life and business career ==
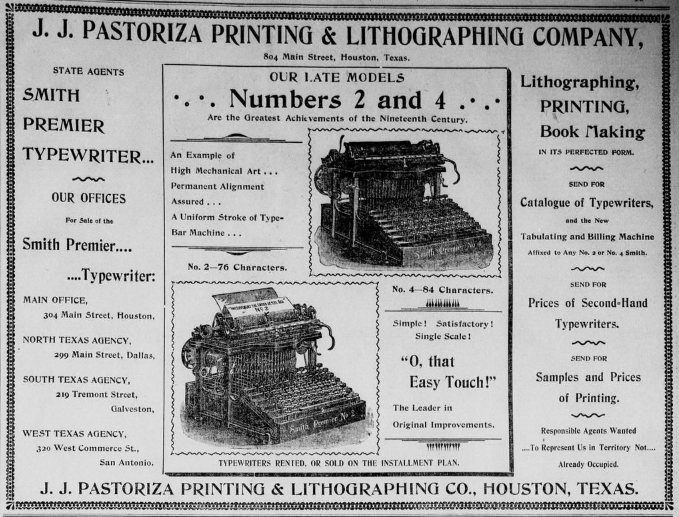
Advertisement for Pastoriza Printing, Houston, TX, May 21, 1899

Joseph Jay Pastoriza was born in New Orleans, Louisiana, on January 8, 1857, to immigrants from Barcelona, Spain. His father died in 1858 shortly after bringing his infant son to Houston, Texas. Edward Daly and his wife adopted Pastoriza, but Daily died in the Civil War in 1862.

Pastoriza attended Fitzgerald's Academy in Houston. As a seventeen-year-old, he apprenticed to a blacksmith by day and worked as a bookkeeper at night. By 1878, he entered the printing business, working as a business manager for a local newspaper. He was proprietor of Pastoriza Printing and Lithographing Company. He also represented some local businesses as vice-president of the Houston Manufacturers Association. He successfully advocated for downtown Houston businesses to close at 6pm, a measure to control retail employees' work hours.

On January 15, 1886, he married Lula Girard of Waxahachie, Texas.

== Political life ==
=== Houston Single Tax League ===
Late in 1901, Pastoriza mounted a petition drive in favor of municipal ownership of utilities, collecting 800–1000 signatures. Pastoriza joined the Houston Single Tax League, a Georgist organization founded in 1890. In 1903, he paid $350 for a lot at Cleburne and Caroline, south of the developed part of the city. He built a shoddy cabin on the land, which had two purposes. He donated the use of the structure to the league. It was also an object-lesson: he vowed to sell the property only if he were offered at least $5,000. If development were to reach his block, he predicted, neighboring improvements would augment the value of his property. He waited only eight years to find a buyer to make an offer to exceed Pastoriza's target price.

The log cabin object-lesson had been intended to illustrate a Georgist principle supporting the single land tax. First, Pastoriza made the most minimal investment in the lot, and his return on investments had been at least ten-fold. He asserted that he had reaped a windfall without adding significantly to the lot or the neighborhood: growth caused the development frontier to expand, and the improvements to the other lots were creating value. So he reasoned that taxing land at a higher rate (and lowering the tax burden on improvements and personal property) would shift the tax burden to land speculators. These policies would also ease the burden on developers, which in turn, would stimulate construction in the city. Just eight years later, neighboring lots across the street from his $350 log cabin lot were selling for $4,750.

From 1906 to 1910, Pastoriza visited cities in Europe and the United States with an interest in understanding various municipal reforms.

=== Houston government ===
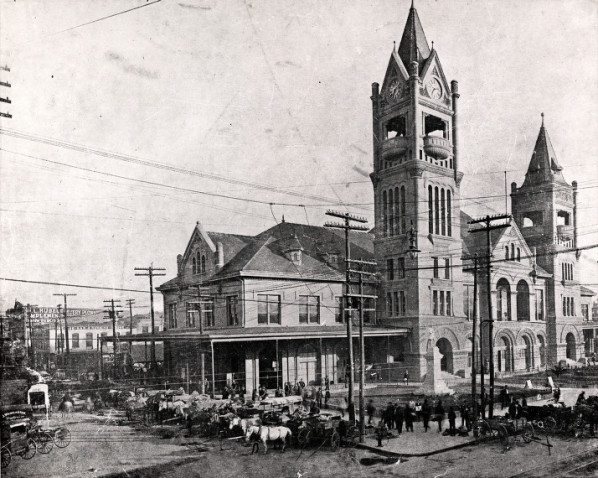
The City Hall and Market House, current location of Market Square Park (1904)

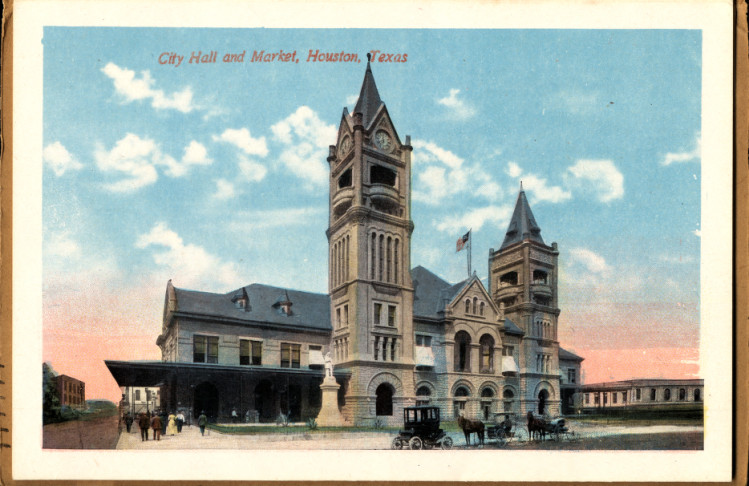
Houston City Hall and Market, circa 1912–1924

Pastoriza ran a successful campaign to be seated as a Commissioner for the City of Houston. He served as Houston Tax Commissioner from 1911 to 1917. During his first year in office, he promoted a property tax system he called the "Somers System of Equalization," named for William A. Somers, whom he had met in New York City in the late 1890s.

The Somers System based the value of land per square foot on the value of the front foot of land on the middle lots of the block. Pastoriza first tested the Somers System on some blocks in downtown Houston. Both city officials and property owners responded favorably. Next Pastoriza traveled to Denver to learn from officials who were implementing the Somers system there. He returned with a report on his experience, and the City Council approved both the Somers System and the broader Houston Plan of Taxation in early 1912.

Pastoriza planned for broad implementation of the Somers System. He began creating a map, dividing Houston into thirty-five tax districts. Within each district, he performed a block-by-block valuation. He determined the value, "of a one-foot wide by one-hundred-foot deep segment in the center of every block." Property assessment in Houston by the Somers method increased valuations by $19 million in 1912, the first year of the program. The Somers method had two distributive effects: it increased the valuations of wealthy land owners and decreased the valuations of many homeowners. It also reduced the tax rates from $1.70 per $100 of valuation to $1.50 per $100, while increasing total revenue by $100,000 (total revenue in 1912 was about $2.2 million). Houston Mayor Horace Baldwin Rice characterized the new method as, "a very efficient system, just and equitable for all." In July 1912, Pastoriza promoted his more general Houston Plan of Taxation. Under the plan, the city assessed land at seventy percent of value, property improvements and merchants' inventories at twenty-five percent of value, and most personal property would be exempt. During the first six months of 1912, Houston added 219 new buildings compared to the first six months of 1911.

Many critics of the Houston Plan claimed that it violated a clause of the Texas Constitution that required that all property be taxed in a uniform way. Pastoriza dismissed this by claiming that property had never been taxed uniformly in Texas. In 1913, he ran for re-election as city commissioner based on his tax plan. Despite outgoing mayor Horace Baldwin Rice's advocacy for the Houston Plan, Rice supported Milt Gieselman as his replacement for mayor, who opposed Pastoriza. The other major mayoral candidate, Ben Campbell, voiced public approval of Pastoriza as commissioner, but did not endorse him. Campbell was elected mayor and Pastoriza was re-elected for one of the commissioner positions, leading the field of fourteen candidates. Mayor Campbell tapped Pastoriza to serve as Mayor Pro Tem.

An organized opposition to the Houston Plan arose in 1914 in the form of the Harris County Taxpayers Association (HCTA). The group included a defeated candidate for mayor, Milt Gieselman, and counted among its leaders such Houston elites as Joseph F. Baker, Harry F. Cohen, Samuel Rosenberg, and Jules Settegast. On January 11, 1915, HCTA petitioned Houston City Council to modify its tax assessment practices. After the council denied this petition, Joseph F. Baker filed a lawsuit against the City of Houston. Meanwhile, the Houston Tax Plan was the focus of the 1915 municipal elections, with incumbents Mayor Ben Campbell and Tax Commissioner Pastoriza defending their offices against Judge Charles W. Bocock and Thomas DeYoung, respectively. The Bocock campaign emphasized the constitutionality of its position on property taxes, which was consistent with that of the HCTA and the lawsuit filed by Joseph F. Baker. All of the incumbents won in 1915, with Pastoriza winning his race for Tax Commissioner by a margin of 5659 to 1963. However, just a few weeks later, Judge John A. Read struck down the Houston Plan (J.W. Baker v. City of Houston).

Single tax advocates campaigned unsuccessfully for a constitutional amendment allowing for unequal valuations and an appeals court affirmed Judge Read's decision. These two rulings against the Houston Plan compelled Mayor Campbell and Commissioner Pastoriza to create a new scheme in order to comply with the law. Coupled with these rulings was a statute mandating that, "each separate parcel of real property shall be valued at its true and full value." At first, Campbell and Pastoriza interpreted the two laws in a most extreme way: if Texas law demanded both equal and full valuation of property, the City of Houston would assess all property at 100 percent of valuation. Even if this was the proper understanding of Read's rulings and the statute, this proved impossible to enforce. The property tax system relied on self-reporting and taxpayers reported only a small percentage of their assets under this new system. For example, bank deposits, which were personal property and subject to local taxation, were radically under reported: Houstonians claimed only $250,000 of an estimated $30–S40 million in local bank deposits. Nor did taxpayers report the full value of their buildings.

H.F. Ring, one of the plaintiff's in the tax suit, proposed taxing land at 70 percent of assessment and improvements at 50 percent of assessment. These rates are compared to 75 percent of land assessment and 25 percent of improvements in the original Houston Plan. This scheme did not comply with the law, but it satisfied the land speculators enough for them to agree to drop their suit. Pastoriza devised an assessment scheme which followed Ring's proposal. Bank deposits and cash were taxed to comply with Read's order, but the local residents did not abide. Under public pressure, Pastoriza rescinded taxation of personal property. In the end, Pastoriza developed a diminished Houston Plan: owners of developed property took on more tax liability than under the original Houston Plan, yet Houston residents did not pay taxes on personal property, leading one critic to claim that the new scheme "was just as illegal as the former one."

Ben Campbell did not run for re-election in 1917 and so Pastoriza entered a crowded mayoral race. Taking on three other candidates, Pastoriza won with fully 44 percent of the vote. Houston's first Hispanic mayor; his parents were natives of Barcelona.

== Death ==
Pastoriza died of heart failure on July 9, 1917, at his home on Austin Street in Houston. At his death, he was not quite three months into his only term as Mayor of Houston. The year he died, he owned real estate valued near $75,000.

== Other readings ==
- Pastoriza, J. J. (March 1915). "The Houston Plan of Taxation". The Annals of the American Academy of Political and Social Science. 158: 194–197. doi:10.1177/000271621505800120. JSTOR 1012861. S2CID 220848596.
- "Interesting People: J. J. Pastoriza". American Magazine. Vol. 75, no. 3. January 1913. p. 28.
- "Death of Joseph J. Pastoriza". Single Tax Review. Vol. 17, no. 4. July–August 1917. p. 241.
- "Why Pastoriza Built The Cabin". Archived from the original on November 29, 2014.
- Young, Samuel Oliver (1912). A thumb-nail history of the city of Houston, Texas: from its founding in 1836 to the year 1912. Houston, Texas: Press of Rein & Sons Company. pp. 34–37 – via The Portal to Texas History, University of North Texas Libraries.

Political offices
Preceded by Ben Campbell	Mayor of Houston, Texas; 1917	Succeeded by Joseph Chappell Hutcheson, Jr.
