= Oneiric Gardens =

2014 video game

- Developer: Lilith Zone
- Composer: Porpentine Charity Heartscape
- Platforms: Windows, macOS, Linux
- Release: 14 September 2014
- Genre: Adventure
- Mode: Single-player

Oneiric Gardens is a 2014 video game by Cicada Marionette, the pseudonym of independent video game developer Lilith Zone. Described as a game depicting a "series of chambers drawing from half-remembered spaces (and) feelings," Oneiric Gardens is open-ended adventure game in which the player explores surrealistic spaces. The game received positive attention from critics as a surrealistic work and led to Lilith's exhibition of the game and engagement in the Dutch contemporary art space through MAMA Rotterdam and Het Nieuwe Instituut.

== Gameplay ==
Gameplay screenshot

Oneiric Gardens is an open-ended game in which the player explores a series of disjointed and surrealistic environments. The player uses the keyboard to traverse a series of rooms, and can interact with doors, objects and scenery. Doors lead between discontinuous and often contrasting environments, contributing to the dreamlike nature of the game. There is no end state to the game, and players are left to navigate the environment and discover the different spaces in the game.

== Development ==
Oneiric Gardens was intended by Lilith as a playful, exploratory environment evocative of the spaces in early 3D video games, with Lilith comparing the game to a "playground", stating she admired how games of the early 3D era "feel so loose and free as self-assured jungle-gym worlds." Specific inspiration for the game was sourced from the 1994 PlayStation game King's Field, which Lilith states incited the desire to "capture the feeling of sludging around uncomfortable dream geometry."

In February 2017, Oneiric Gardens was showcased as an installation under the Intersections exhibition at MAMA Rotterdam, a gallery of emerging and experimental art. The installation was facilitated by Het Nieuwe Instituut, who also selected Lilith as part of the October 2017 International Visitors Programme, a program inviting international professionals from disciplines including digital culture, and they participated in several festivals and events as part of the program. Het Nieuwe Instituut praised Lilith's work as "(pushing) the boundaries of contemporary art and gaming" and described her work as "surprising, poetic and innovative". Oneiric Gardens was also exhibited at the Dutch art and culture event The Overkill Festival in 27-29 October 2017.

== Reception ==
Oneiric Gardens received praise for its unique and surrealistic presentation, and as an example of "arty indie games" that "exploit the strangeness of early 3D environments". Writing for Rock Paper Shotgun, Adam Smith praised the game for its variety in its presentation of "strange and occasionally sinister spaces", stating the game was reminiscent of "a compilation of ideas that would have been at home on a coverdisc in days gone by, a hypnagogic hallucination derived from a sense of pace and weight reminiscent of nineties FPS games, and with sounds from the digital scrapbook". Dan Solberg of Kill Screen interpreted the game as a genuine source of "imagery...in line with (the) Surrealist tradition," stating "pronounced, distant horizon line and familiar-yet-strange imagery are right out of Surrealism’s playbook," praising the game's "playful exuberance" and "fresh" approach to the surrealist process. In a less favorable review, Kratzen considered the game to be a poor "environmental sim, stating "for such a sim to invite exploration across its every corner, there are very few secrets, easter eggs, or other topics of surprising interests that you can find outside of what the typical player would see regardless."
