= Honda AC15 =

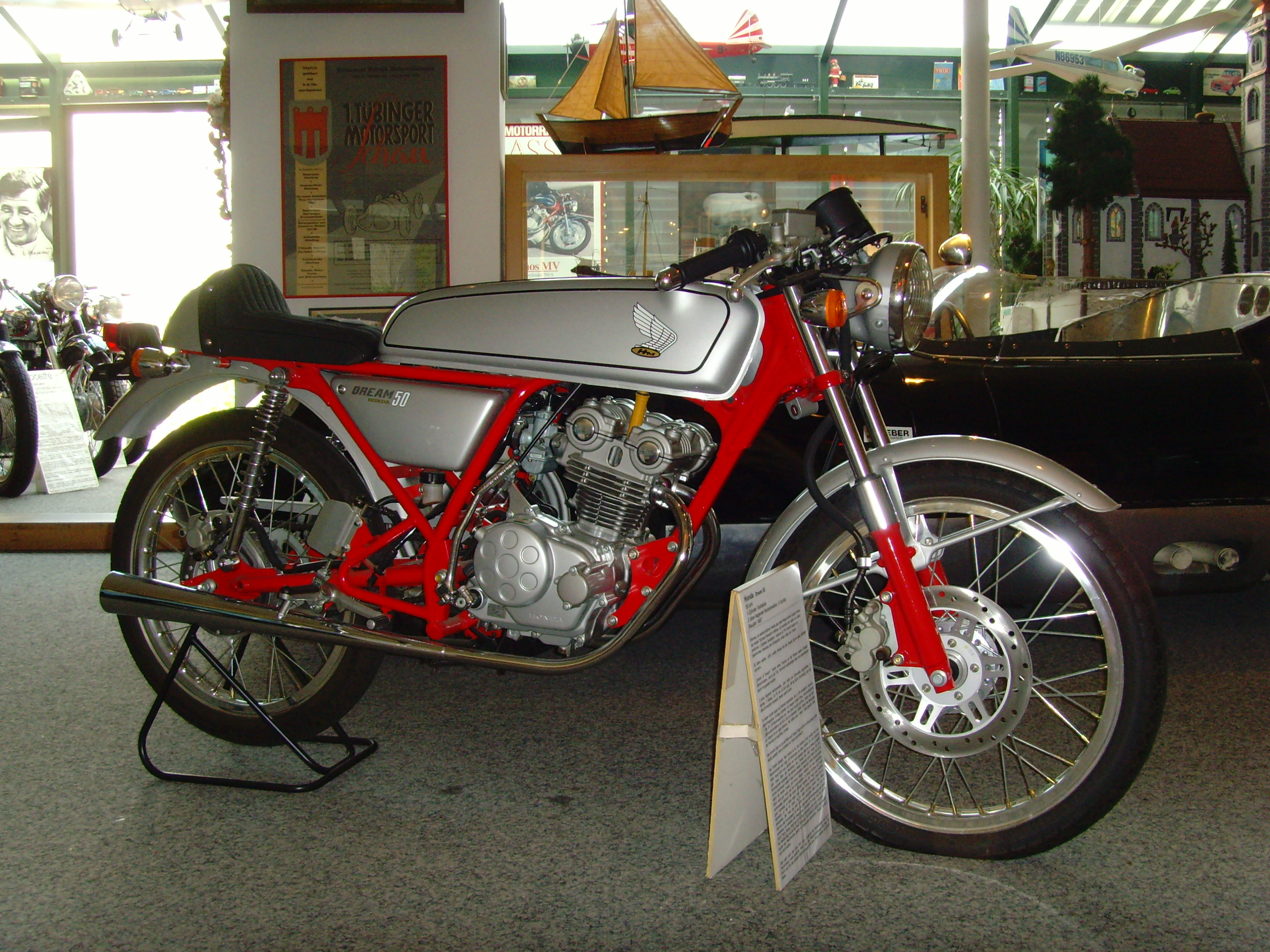
- Manufacturer: Honda Motor Company, Limited
- Also called: Honda Dream 50 (AC15)
- Production: 1997 (CB50V) and 1998 (CB50W)
- Class: Sport bike
- Engine: 50 cc (3.1 cu in), air cooled, transverse, DOHC, four stroke, single
- Power: 5.6 horsepower (4.2 kW) @ 10,500 RPM
- Torque: 4.11 newton metres = 3.03 foot pounds @ 8,500 RPM
- Transmission: 5-speed, manual transmission chain final drive
- Suspension: Front; telescopic fork with inner springs Rear; swingarm with twin shock absorbers
- Wheelbase: 1,195 mm (47.0 in)
- Dimensions: L: 1,830 mm (72 in); W: 615 mm (24.2 in)
- Weight: 81 kg (180 lb) (dry)
- Fuel capacity: 6.2 litres (1.4 imp gal; 1.6 US gal)
- Related: Honda CR110 Cub Racing

The Honda AC15 or Dream 50 is a retro style street legal 50 cc (3.1 cu in) single cylinder motorcycle manufactured by Honda in 1997 (CB50V) and 1998 (CB50W).

== Design ==
Honda built the AC15 to commemorate the successful 1962 Honda RC110 single cylinder racer. Showing the 1960s style was short racing handlebars and an elongated and low-profile fuel tank.

The frame was a diamond design with a reinforced single front down tube bolting to the engine's crankcase. The top of the frame was a reinforced double-tube over-and-under configuration meeting a multi-tube box under the rider.

Front and rear disc brakes were standard and unusual for a small displacement motorcycle.

The engine was a rare design for 50 cubic centimeters, having a single cylinder with double overhead camshafts.

A commercial racer was available in 1962 called the CR110 Cub Racing which produced 8.5 horsepower (6.3 kW) from a single cylinder and had drum brakes. A race-only version designated the AR02 or Dream 50R, was imported into the US in 2004.
