= List of Firefly Alpha launches =

Firefly Alpha is a small-lift launch vehicle developed by Firefly Aerospace. Its maiden launch was on September 3, 2021.

== Launch statistics ==
=== Launch outcomes ===
- Failure
- Partial failure
- Success
- Scheduled

=== Launch sites ===
- Cape Canaveral, SLC‑20
- Vandenberg, SLC‑2W
- MARS, LP‑0A
- Esrange, LC‑3C

=== Rocket configurations ===
- Block I
- Block II

== Launch history ==
Flight No.	Name	Date / time (UTC)	Rocket, configuration	Launch site	Payload	Orbit	Customer	Launch outcome
1	"DREAM"	3 September 2021; 01:59	Firefly Alpha Block I	Vandenberg, SLC-2W	Various	Retrograde LEO	Various	Failure
1	Maiden flight of the Firefly Alpha; carrying various payloads as part of their Dedicated Research and Education Accelerator Mission program. Due to an engine failure approximately 15 seconds after the launch, the rocket lost control at transonic speed approximately two and a half minutes after launch that resulted in the activation of the flight termination system and loss of the vehicle.							
2	"To The Black"	1 October 2022; 07:01	Firefly Alpha Block I	Vandenberg, SLC-2W	TechEdSat-15 (TES-15), TIS Serenity, PicoBus (deploying five PocketQubes)	Retrograde LEO	NASA Ames, SJSU, Teachers in Space, Inc., Libre Space Foundation, Fossa Systems, AMSAT-EA	Partial failure
2	First partially successful orbital launch, carrying educational payloads, including a hosted payload, Firefly Capsule 2. Alpha deployed 7 satellites; however, due to the lower than intended final deployment orbit (219 km x 279 km, intended 300 km), most of the satellites re-entered approximately a week after launch.							
3	"VICTUS NOX"	15 September 2023; 02:28	Firefly Alpha Block I	Vandenberg, SLC-2W	VICTUS NOX	SSO	U.S. Space Force (SSC)	Success
3	Tactically Responsive Space-3 (TacRS-3) mission to display rapid response launch capabilities — the payload was integrated and launched 27 hours after launch order were received from the customer. First fully successful launch of Alpha. Second stage performed a re-ignition for a controlled deorbit. VICTUS NOX decayed from orbit on January 28, 2025.							
4	"Fly The Lightning"	22 December 2023; 17:32	Firefly Alpha Block I	Vandenberg, SLC-2W	Tantrum	LEO	Lockheed Martin	Partial failure
4	Dedicated commercial launch, carrying an Electronically Steerable Antenna technology demonstrator payload for Lockheed Martin integrated on a Terran Orbital Nebula satellite bus. Stage 2 engine relight did not deliver the payload to its planned target orbit. Communications to the spacecraft were established and some mission operations took place. The satellite decayed on February 10, 2024, at approximately 15:00 UTC.							
5	"Noise Of Summer"	4 July 2024; 04:04	Firefly Alpha Block I	Vandenberg, SLC-2W	VCLS Demo-2FB	SSO	NASA	Success
5	NASA Venture Class Launch Services 2 (VCLS 2) Mission Two, officially known as VCLS Demo-2FB. The ELaNa 43 mission, consisting of eight CubeSats, launched on this flight.							
6	"Message In A Booster"	29 April 2025; 13:37	Firefly Alpha Block I	Vandenberg, SLC-2W	LM 400 Demo	LEO	Lockheed Martin	Failure
6	Carried an experimental satellite for Lockheed Martin in the first of 15 launches contracted through 2029, with options for 10 more. A mishap during stage separation damaged the second stage engine, substantially reducing thrust and preventing the payload from reaching orbital velocity.							
7	"Stairway To Seven"	12 March 2026; 00:50	Firefly Alpha Block I	Vandenberg, SLC-2W	Test payload	LEO	Firefly Aerospace	Success
7	Return-to-flight mission following the failure of "Message In A Booster" in April 2025. Test flight for validating various systems components to be used on Block II. Also carried a demonstrator payload for Lockheed Martin. Final Block I launch.							

== Future launches ==
Future launches are listed chronologically when firm plans are in place. The order of the later launches is much less certain. Launches are expected to take place "no earlier than" (NET) the listed date.

Date / time (UTC)	Rocket, configuration	Launch site	Payload	Orbit	Customer
Q1 2027	Firefly Alpha Block II	Vandenberg, SLC-2W	QuickSounder	LEO	NOAA
Q1 2027	First satellite in NOAA's Near Earth Orbit Network (NEON) Program.				
2026	Firefly Alpha Block II	Vandenberg, SLC-2W	EOS SAR 1	SSO	EOS Data Analytics
2026	First EOS synthetic-aperture radar (SAR) constellation satellite.				
2026	Firefly Alpha Block II	Vandenberg, SLC-2W	TacSat	LEO	Lockheed Martin
2026	Second of 15 launches contracted by Lockheed Martin through 2029. Formerly slated to launch in Q2 2025.				
2026	Firefly Alpha Block II	Vandenberg, SLC-2W	OTB-2	LEO	General Atomics
2026	Part of General Atomics Electromagnetic Systems Group's Orbital Test Bed (OTB) program, designed to host experiments created by various customers.				
2026	Firefly Alpha Block II	Vandenberg, SLC-2W	VICTUS SOL	LEO	U.S. Space Force (SSC)
2026	Part of the United States Space Force's Tactically Responsive Space (TacRS) program.				
2026	Firefly Alpha Block II	Vandenberg, SLC-2W	TBA	LEO	L3Harris
2026	First of three dedicated launches for L3Harris.				
2026	Firefly Alpha Block II	Vandenberg, SLC-2W	TBA	LEO	L3Harris
2026	Second of three dedicated launches for L3Harris.				
2026	Firefly Alpha Block II	Vandenberg, SLC-2W	TBA	LEO	L3Harris
2026	Third of three dedicated launches for L3Harris.				
2027	Firefly Alpha Block II	MARS, LP-0A	INCUS	LEO	NASA
2027	Part of NASA's Venture-Class Acquisition of Dedicated and Rideshare (VADR) program. First announced Alpha launch from the Mid-Atlantic Regional Spaceport at Wallops.				
TBD	Firefly Alpha Block II	TBD	Dedicated rideshare mission	LEO	Spaceflight, Inc.
TBD	Dedicated smallsat rideshare mission to low Earth orbit utilizing Firefly's Elytra Dawn orbital tug.				
TBD	Firefly Alpha Block II	TBD	Satlantis EO Constellation	LEO	Satlantis
TBD	Satlantis earth observation satellite constellation.				

== See also ==
- List of Electron launches
- List of Vega launches
- List of SSLV launches
