= Moped =

Small motorcycle-like motor road vehicle

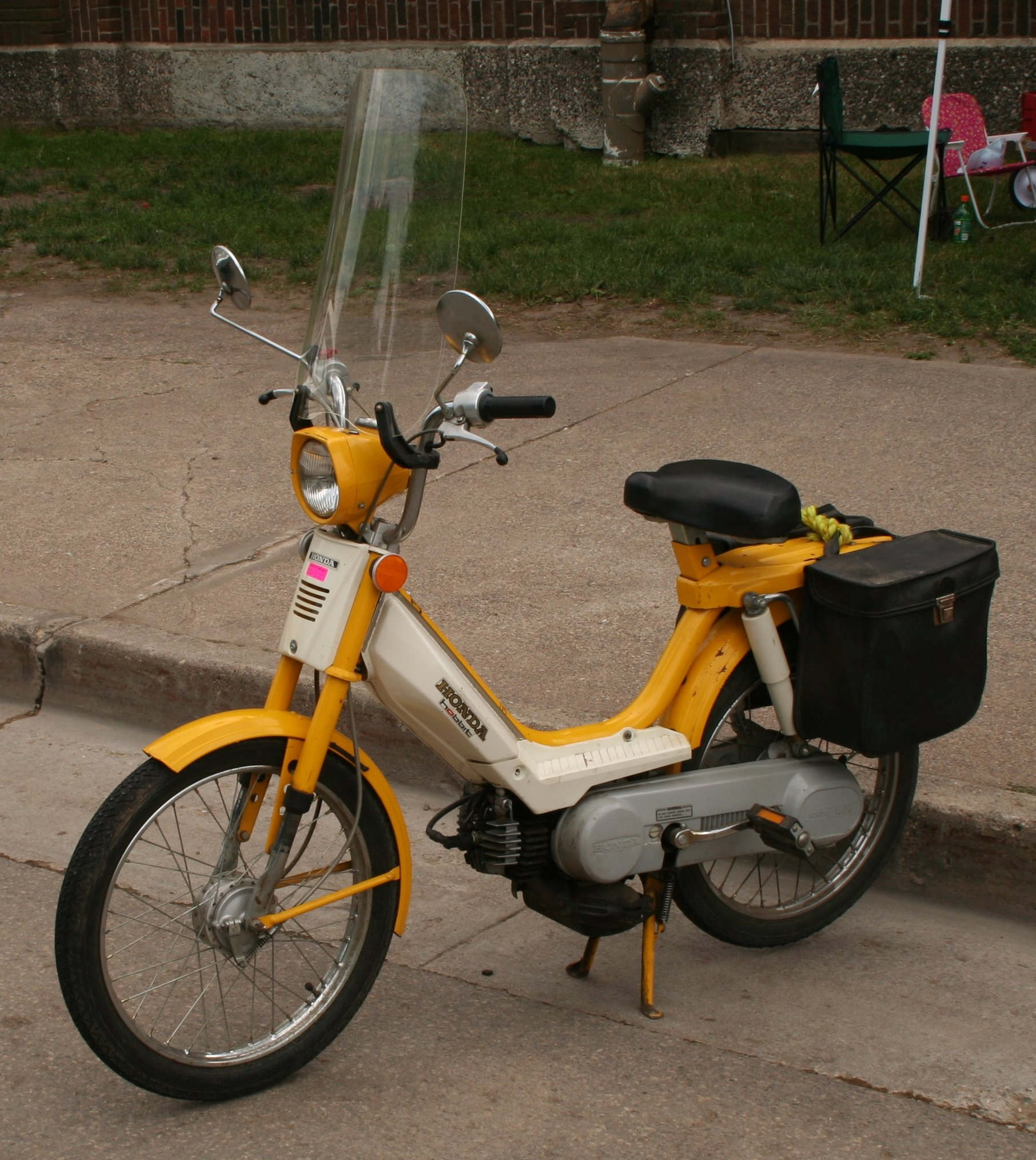
Honda Hobbit PA 50/Camino moped (European market)

A moped (/ˈmoʊ.pɛd/ MOH-ped) is a type of small and inexpensive motorcycle, generally having a less stringent licensing requirement than full motorcycles or automobiles. Historically, the term exclusively meant a motorcycle with bicycle pedals. Mopeds typically travel only slightly faster than bicycles on public roads.

Traditional mopeds are distinguishable by their pedals, similar to a bicycle. Some mopeds have a step-through frame design, while others have motorcycle frame designs, including a backbone and a raised fuel tank, mounted directly between the saddle and the head tube. Some resemble motorized bicycles, similar to modern ebikes. Most are similar to a regular motorcycle but with pedals and a crankset that may be used with or instead of motor drive. Although mopeds usually have two wheels, some jurisdictions classify low-powered three- or four-wheeled vehicles (including ATVs and go-karts) as a moped.

Usually, a moped can be any motorcycle with an engine capacity below 120 cc (7.3 cu in) (most commonly 50 cc (3.1 cu in) or lower).

== Etymology ==
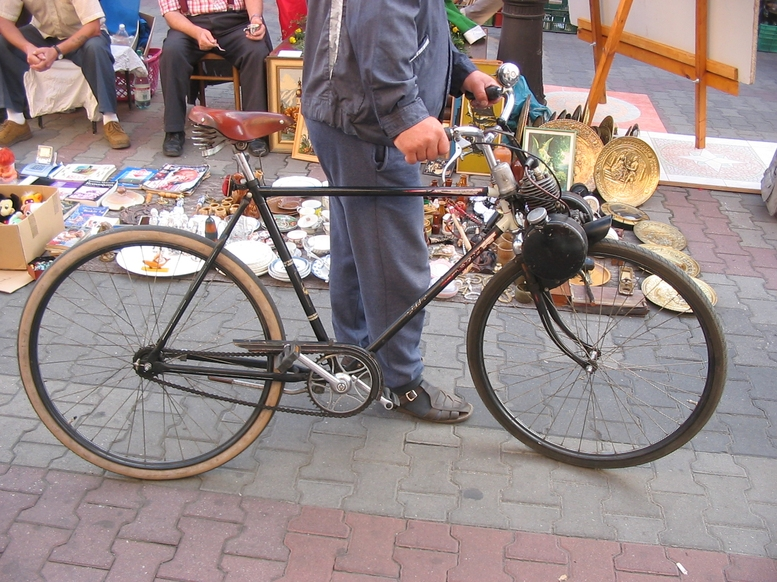
The original moped – a bicycle equipped with an engine

The word moped was coined by the Swedish journalist Harald Nielsen in 1952, as a portmanteau of the Swedish words motor and pedaler. The claimed derivation from the term motor-velocipede is incorrect. According to Douglas Harper, the Swedish terms originated from "(trampcykel med) mo(tor och) ped(aler)", which means "pedal cycle with engine and pedals" (the earliest versions had auxiliary pedals). Like some of the earliest two wheeled motorcycles, all mopeds were once equipped with bicycle pedals.

== History ==
The term "moped" now only applies to low-power (often super-economy) vehicles, but pedals were fitted to some early motorcycles, such as the pictured 1912 Douglas. Pedaling away from stationary was a great improvement over "run and jump" and light pedal assistance (LPA) was valuable for climbing hills. Better transmissions with wider ranges, better clutches and much better engine performance made pedals obsolete on most motorcycles by 1918 but the pedals on mopeds remained valuable for their original purposes as late as the 1990s.

The earliest mopeds were bicycles with a helper motor in various locations, for example on top of the front wheel; they were also called cyclemotors. An example of that type is the VéloSoleX brand, which simply has a roller driving the front tire.

A more innovative design was known in the UK as the Cyclemaster. This had a complete powered rear wheel which was simply substituted for the bicycle rear wheel, which originated from a design by two DKW engineers in Germany. Slightly larger machines, commonly with a 98 cc (6.0 cu in) engine were known as autocycles. On the other hand, some mopeds, such as the Czech-made Jawa, were derived from motorcycles.

A further category of low-powered two-wheelers exists today in some jurisdictions for bicycles with helper motors – these are often defined as power-assisted bicycles or motorized bicycles. Other jurisdictions may categorize the same machines as mopeds, creating a certain amount of confusion. In many countries three-wheelers and microcars are classified as mopeds or variations thereof. This practice is not restricted to the third world; France and Belgium classify microcars such as the Aixam similarly or as "light quadricycles". The Ariel 3, a motorised three-wheeler is classed as a moped.

As of 1977, the Vienna Convention on Road Traffic considers the moped any two-wheeled or three-wheeled vehicle which is fitted with an internal combustion engine having a cylinder capacity not exceeding 50 cc.

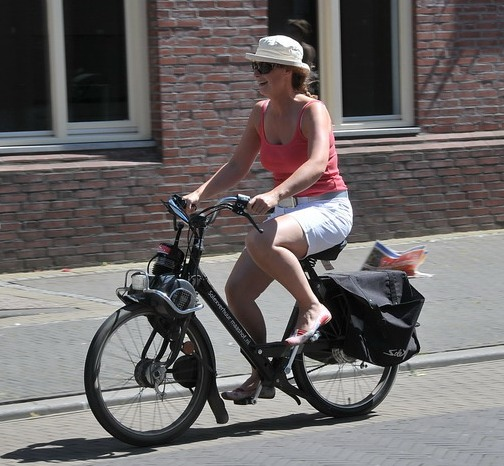
A woman riding a 2005 VéloSoleX Black'n Roll S4800 in France

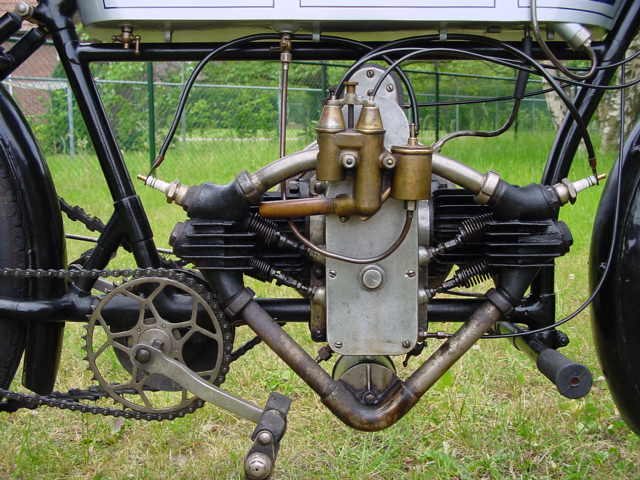
This 1912 Douglas has modern chain-drive but still has pedals

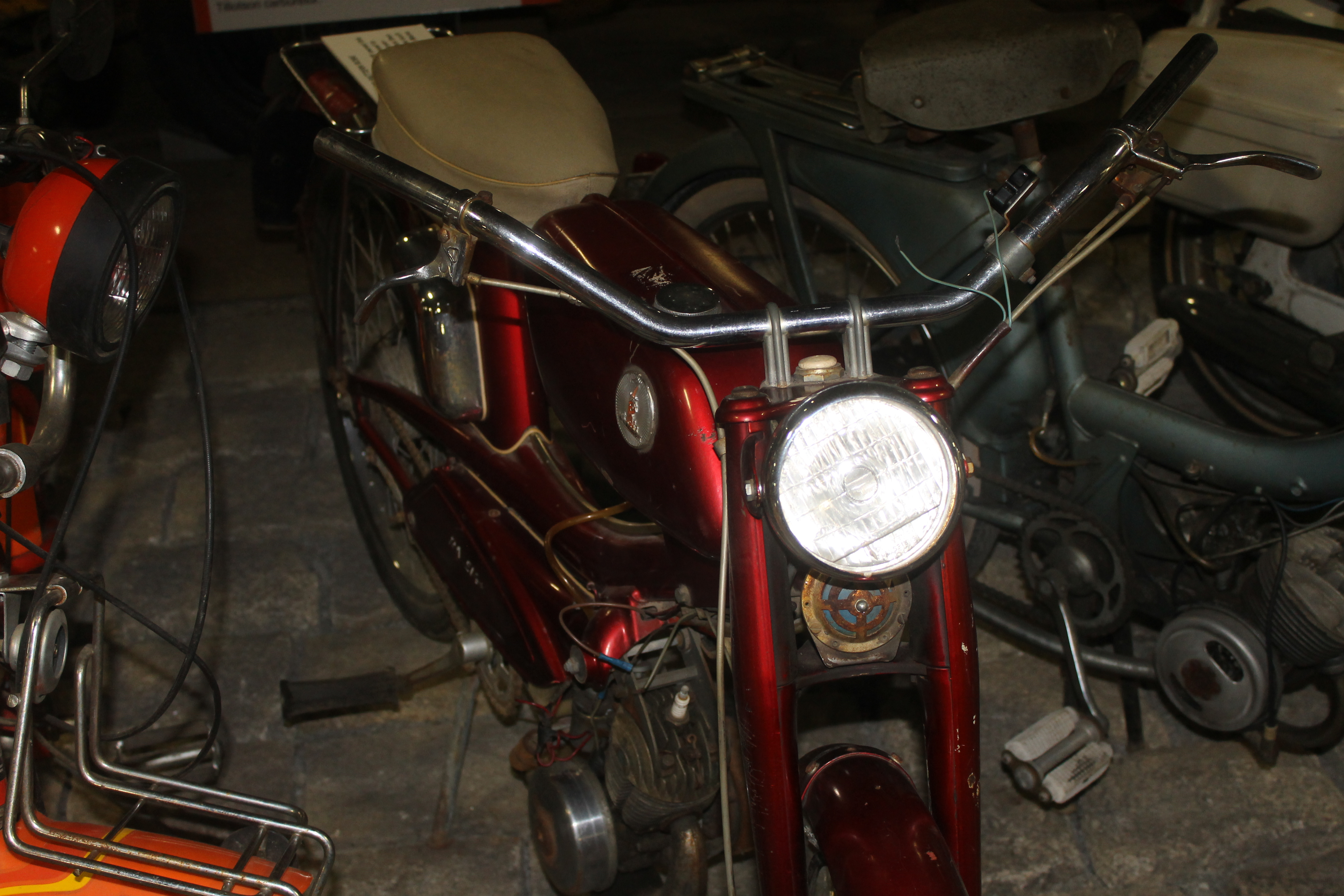
1947 Italian-made moped on display at the Cole Land Transportation Museum in Bangor, Maine

== Emissions ==
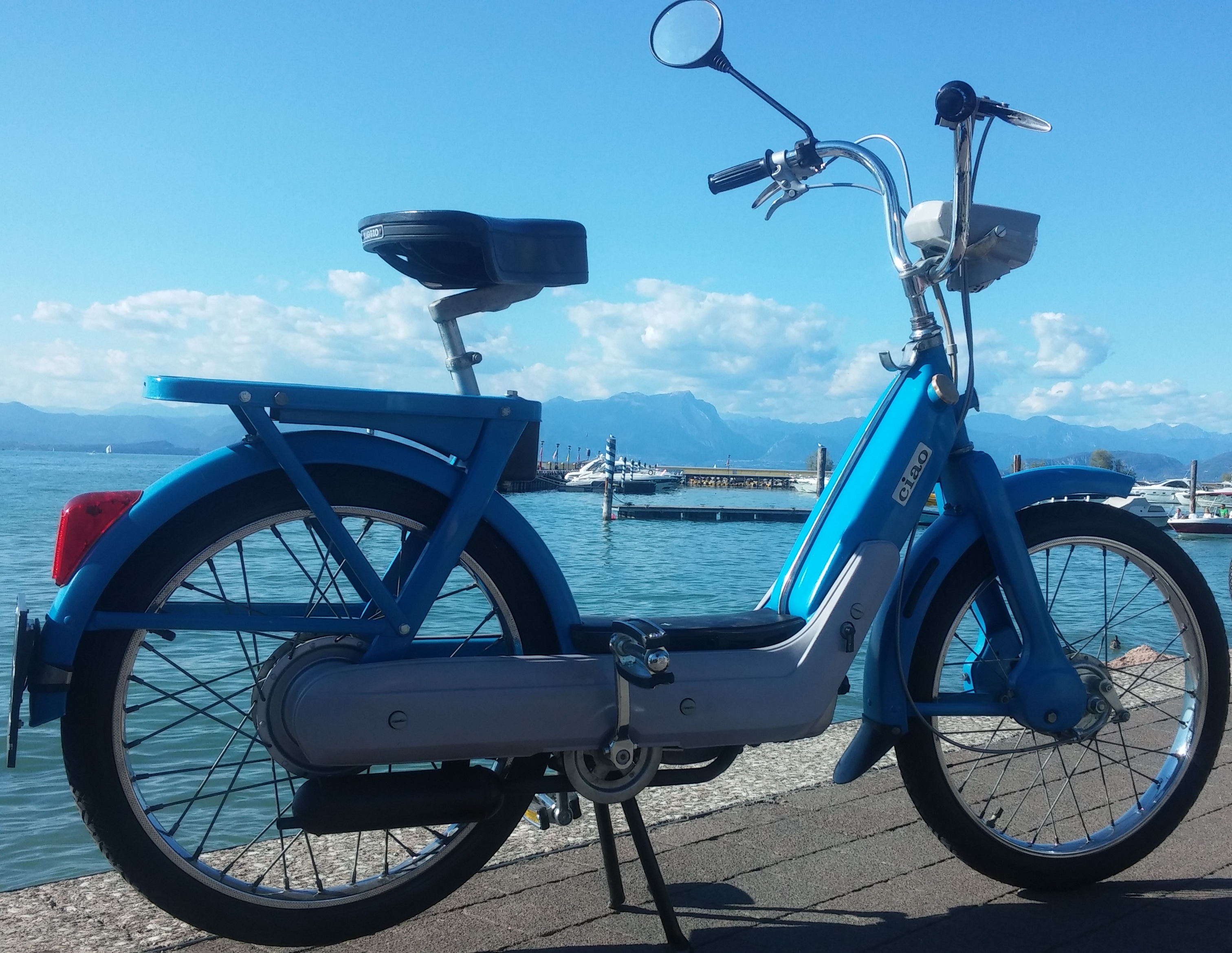
Piaggio Ciao (1973)

Mopeds can achieve fuel economy of over 100 mpg_{‑US} (2.4 L/100 km; 120 mpg_{‑imp}). The emissions of mopeds have been the subject of multiple studies. Studies have found that two-stroke 50 cc mopeds, with and without catalytic converters, emit ten to thirty times the hydrocarbons and particulate emissions of the outdated Euro 3 automobile standards. In the same study, four-stroke mopeds, with and without catalytic converters, emitted three to eight times the hydrocarbons and particulate emissions of the Euro 3 automobile standards. Approximate parity with automobiles was achieved with NOx emissions in these studies. Emissions performance was tested on a g/km basis and was unaffected by fuel economy. Currently in the United States, the EPA allows motorcycles, scooters, and mopeds with engine displacements less than 280 cc (17 cu in) to emit ten times the NOx and six times the CO as the median Tier II bin 5 automobile regulations. An additional air quality problem can also arise from the use of moped and scooter transportation over automobiles, as a higher density of motorized vehicles can be supported by existing transportation infrastructure.

== Safety ==
Safely riding a moped mostly requires the same considerations as safely riding a motorcycle. However the lower speeds reduce some dangers and increase others. The biggest danger is that other traffic may not notice the presence of a moped; bright clothes and reflective fittings help. Drivers may even see the moped, recognize it as harmless to them and simply forget it is there, pulling out of side-turnings into its path. Similarly, a car approaching a moped from behind will approach it more quickly than the driver expects, and the driver's attention may be more attuned to other automobile traffic rather than the moped, increasing the likelihood of an accident. This is a particular problem for mopeds used on high-speed roads where they may not be intended to travel.

Mopeds are often tuned for higher speeds, powers or engine displacements. For this to be legally allowed in most jurisdictions, such vehicles should be re-registered as motorcycles, and their driver's license requirements, taxes, insurance costs, and minimum driver age may be higher. A tuned vehicle, not designed for higher speeds, is not as safe as a purpose-designed motorcycle. A survey of Finnish high school vocational and gymnasium students found that 80% and 70% of their respective mopeds were tuned. Only 10% of trade school students had a moped that conformed to legislation. The average maximum speed was 72 km/h (45 mph), far higher than the legally allowable 45 km/h (28 mph). Another study reported that of school-age moped owners, 50% of boys and 15% of girls have an illegally tuned moped.

== Individual countries/regions ==
Country / Region	Regulations and variations, overlap with other powered two-wheelers
Australia	Different laws apply to different states. To ride a scooter over 50 cc (3.1 cu in) you need a motorcycle licence in all states, but you can ride a scooter (max 50 cc or 3.1 cu in, 50 km/h; 30 mph) with a car licence in QLD and SA and with a moped specific licence in WA otherwise a general motorcycle licence is required. Mopeds that do not meet Australian design specifications are not allowed on public roads, with the exception of electric bicycles with EU pedelec compliance or equipped with a meagre electrical power-source (combustion engines cannot be used) of just 200 W (0.27 PS; 0.27 bhp). So called "monkey-bikes" were quickly made illegal as they gained huge popularity. Mopeds in Australia have to be registered and thus ADR approved in order to be ridden on Australian roads. All requirements are listed in the consumer affairs website. Helmets are mandatory.
Austria	In Austria, a moped is defined as a motorized bicycle with at most 50 cc (3.1 cu in) and a maximum speed of 45 km/h (28 mph), which is close to the speed limit within towns (50 km/h (31 mph)). Since September 2009, drivers of mopeds have to be at least 15 years of age and in possession of a moped pass or a regular driver's license.
Brazil	In Brazil, the definition of moped and the regulations regarding its use has been varying throughout the years. From 1985 to 1997, a moped was defined as human propulsion vehicle aided by an engine displacing less than 50 cc (3.1 cu in), no more than 3.0 hp (2.2 kW; 3.0 PS), having a maximum speed of no more than 50 km/h (31 mph) and having pedals similar to those found in a bicycle. No license was required. From 1997 onwards, the legal definition of moped changed to "a two- or three-wheeled vehicle having an internal combustion engine with displacement inferior to 50 cc (3.1 cu in) and maximum factory speed of less than 50 km/h (31 mph)". The 1997 New Code of Transit also stated that any person aged 14 or older could ride a moped provided that person could read and be physically able. However, in 1998 the minimum age limit was changed to 18 years, since Brazilian Law does not allow minors to be criminally responsible, which contradicts the 1997 New Code of Transit, that states that being criminally responsible is a requirement to be able to get a license.
Canada	In Canada the moped has been repealed from the Motor Vehicle Safety Regulations. Nevertheless, the vehicle itself is still legislated within various provinces. In Alberta, mopeds up to 49 cc (3.0 cu in) and over 55 kg (121 lb) used to require a class 6 motorcycle license. In 2009, weight restrictions were removed, and the speed limit increased from 50 km/h (30 mph) to 70 km/h (45 mph). A Class 7 license is the minimum requirement to operate a moped. They are allowed to carry more than one person provided the user is over 18 years of age. Mopeds are subject to all of the same traffic laws as other vehicles, and all riders must wear a helmet, while ensuring their moped is insured and registered. Regulations have changed: as of July 1, 2009, there is no longer a weight restriction and speed has increased to 70 km/h (45 mph). In British Columbia, mopeds (limited-speed motorcycles) and motor assisted cycles (MAC) have separate and distinct classifications and requirements. The following criteria apply to a moped (limited speed motorcycle): Definition of a limited-speed motorcycle: no more than 50 cc (3.1 cu in) engine displacement or 1.5 kilowatts (2.04 PS; 2.01 bhp) motor rating; does not require clutching or shifting after the drive system is engaged; has a maximum speed on level ground of 70 km/h (43 mph); weighs no more than 95 kg (209 lb) excluding fuel and batteries; wheels must be 25.4 cm (10.0 in) in diameter or more; Requirements for operation of a moped (limited speed motorcycle): the vehicle must be registered, licensed and insured for road use; the operator must have a driver's license (any class); the operator must wear a helmet; In Ontario, "a moped is a motor-assisted bicycle fitted with pedals that can be operated at all times and has a maximum speed of 50 km/h (31 mph)". A motor assisted bicycle is a bicycle: (a) that is fitted with pedals that are operable at all times to propel the bicycle, (b) that weighs not more than 55 kg (121 lb), (c) that has no hand or foot operated clutch or gearbox driven by the motor and transferring power to the driven wheel, (d) that has an attached motor driven by electricity or having a piston displacement of not more than 50 cubic centimetres (3.1 cu in), and (e) that does not have sufficient power to enable the bicycle to attain a speed greater than 50 kilometres per hour (31 mph) on level ground within a distance of 2 kilometres (1.2 mi) from a standing start; ("cyclomoteur") Since 28 November 2005, moped drivers are required to have either a full M license or a restricted class M license to legally ride on roads in Ontario. Prior to that date riders only required a G license. The G license is a "general" license for automobile drivers such as cars, small vans and trucks.
Denmark	Mopeds in Denmark are divided into "small mopeds" and "big mopeds". "Small" mopeds have a speed limit of 30 km/h (19 mph), and "big" mopeds have one on 45 km/h (28 mph). Between 15 and 18 years of age, a moped driving license is required to drive the small moped. A car driver's or motorcycle license is needed and the driver must be at least 18 years old to drive a big one. All new mopeds (both types) bought after 1 June 2006 must be registered with a license plate, and have insurance. The older models are not required to have a license plate. All mopeds must now have insurance in Denmark.
European Union	The drivers' license category for mopeds across the E.U. now is the AM driver's license. This license is for scooters and mopeds with no more than 50 cc (3.1 cu in), and a maximum speed of 45 km/h (28 mph). E.U. member countries that had not fully implemented the E.U. directive that refers to the moped and other drivers license categories had to do so by 2013 at the latest. The "E.U. moped" is a scooter, moped (or similar) with two, three or four wheels, a maximum speed of 45 km/h (28 mph) and an obligatory license plate as proof of insurance. Many E.U. countries only require special insurer issued plates, not state-issued plates.
Finland	Mopeds can be driven with an AM120-class driving license, which can be obtained at the age of 15. People born before 1985 can drive a moped without a license. The power of an internal combustion engine moped is limited to 2.5 horsepower, the speed limit is 45 km/h (28 mph), and engine capacity can be a maximum of 50 cc (3.1 cu in) (with electric motor, maximum power is restricted to 4.0 kilowatts (5.4 PS; 5.4 bhp)). Mopeds are allowed to carry one passenger with the driver if the moped is registered as having two seats. Both driver and passenger are required to wear helmets. After Finland joined the European Union, EU regulations increased the maximum weight of moped and speed limit was increased from 40 to 45 km/h (25 to 28 mph). In Finland, like in all EU countries, it is illegal to drive a moped without a homologated safety helmet.
Germany	German law has two categories for mopeds. The first and slower category is the so-called Mofa, with a maximum design speed of no more than 25 km/h (16 mph) and only the driver is allowed on the bike, no passenger. Minimum age is 15 and no license is required, but a written test has to be completed. The second category is the moped, with a maximum design speed of 45 km/h (28 mph), the minimum age is 16, a drivers license is required, one passenger is allowed if the moped or scooter is certified for a passenger. Both types need an insurer issued license plate, which is much smaller than regular state-issued plates, which have to be renewed every 12 months, changing the color of the plates every year. Since a 16-year-old can now drive a 125 cc (7.6 cu in) bike and scooters in the "moped" category allow for transporting a passenger comfortably, mopeds, even though they have less power, more appeal, and space, have almost disappeared as a result of the new E.U. laws. Most teens that do not have the money for the costly A1 driver's license (first step towards the full motorcycle license), which allows them to drive a 125 cc (7.6 cu in) scooter or motorcycle, go for the less expensive AM driver's license, which allows them to drive a moped or scooter with a maximum speed of 45 km/h (28 mph), but less than 1% chose a moped over a scooter based bike. Modern scooter design and amenities have effectively changed how teens chose their first set of wheels in Germany.
Greece	Papi (usually 125cc) or papaki (usually 50cc) is the common local name for mopeds in Greece. Mopeds are usually powered by small two- or four-stroke engines, ranging from 50 to 125 cc (3.1 to 7.6 cu in). They are very popular among young people due to their low price, the low maintenance cost, and the vast stock of parts (original or tuning). They are widely used by all age groups, usually 13 and up. The most known "duckling" was the 1980s Honda 50 cc moped, which is still in use today. (Use of these mopeds requires a license [A1 category] and exams passed before attaining the license.)
Hungary	For a vehicle to fit within this category it has to be powered with a 50 cc (3.1 cu in) motor, and can only have a maximum designed speed of 45 km/h (28 mph). It can have 2, 3 or 4 wheels, if the vehicle has a covered passenger area such as a moped car, e.g.: (The Aixam micro car) wearing a motorcycle helmet is optional, otherwise it is mandatory, and the failure to wear one can be fined by the police. To drive a moped one needs to obtain an M ("moped") type European license, which one can get over the age of 14. Because mopeds are inexpensive compared to other forms of motorized transport, and the running expenses are low (the third-party insurance is only 4000 Ft-$12 - €12 ), and since they can be driven after obtaining inexpensive moped license, or having an "A", "B", "C" or "D" type driver's licence, they have become quite popular in larger cities. Vehicles registered as mopeds do not count as motor vehicles, therefore they can only use regular country roads between cities. Highways and expressways are off limits for them. Mopeds cannot carry passengers (even if they have space for one) and trailers. Using bicycle roads or bicycle lanes inside city limits is forbidden. They can use bus lanes, if they do not hold up the bus traffic. Outside city limits bicycle lanes can be used with a maximum speed of 30 km/h (19 mph). Their maximum allowed speed on any road is 40 km/h (25 mph). You do not need to have a licence plate, but it is mandatory to have insurance paid (and proven by a yearly sticker plus the insurance papers must be carried along) to go on common roads.
Indonesia	Mopeds are not allowed on Indonesian tollways. To ride one, you must have the C-Class driving licence, which is divided into three groups: CI For max. 250cc and a minimum age of 17 Years old; CII For 250-500cc or Electric Equivalent and a minimum age of 18 Years old; and CIII for >500cc or Electric Equivalent and a minimum age of 19 years old. Riders are also required to wear a jacket with reflective material accompanied by the driver's identification, wear long pants, wear shoes, use hand gloves, and bring a raincoat.
Ireland	A moped is defined as being mechanically propelled "bicycle" fitted with an engine having a capacity less 50 cc and a maximum design speed no more than 45 km/h (30 mph). By contrast, a motorcycle is defined in the same way, except that it has an engine larger than 50 cc or a top speed in excess of 45 km/h (30 mph). The license category for a moped is "M". The minimum age to obtain a provisional (learner) or full license is 16, the same as for a class A1 (125 cc/11 kW) motorcycle. Holders of car, truck or bus licenses granted before 21 October 2006 have an automatic entitlement to a full moped license without taking a test. As with category A (unrestricted) and A1 motorcycles, a provisional license holder may not carry a passenger.
Italy	Mopeds are not allowed on highways. To ride one you must have the AM-Class driving license which can be obtained at 14 years of age. Owners of car or bike licenses may drive them freely. Registration (with plate) and insurance are mandatory. The law dictates all mopeds be restricted to 45 km/h (28 mph), but this is largely ignored and it is common for dealerships to sell them unrestricted if asked beforehand; this is not tolerated by the authorities. The new law increases penalties up to €1338,59. Helmets are mandatory. Since 2006, a passenger may be carried on suitably built (dual seat) and registered mopeds. The driver must be over 18 years. Mopeds registered before this date that satisfy the technical and legal requirements may be re-registered (a new plate is issued) and used to carry a passenger.
Japan	Motorcycles with up to 50 cc (3.1 cu in) petrol engines or 0.6 kW (0.82 PS; 0.80 bhp) rated power generators are classified Motorized bicycle (原動機付自転車, gendoukitsuki-jitensha). The drivers must be older than 16, get the driving license, register the vehicles and wear helmets. Car driving license holders also can drive them. The legally maximum speed is 30 km/h (19 mph).
Malaysia	In Malaysia and some other Southeast Asian countries, small motorcycles are classified differently, most of the machines known as mopeds in the West (e.g. Honda Super Cub) are known as underbones (kapchai in Malaysia). These are the machines elsewhere known as scooters or sometimes "step-throughs". Kapchais have engines up to 150 cc (9.2 cu in), can reach speeds of 120–130 km/h (75–81 mph), and are used on public roads and expressways. Some people tuned up their mopeds for illegal racing on the highway, increasing the top speed of certain moped to be more than 200 km/h (100 mph).
Netherlands	In the Netherlands mopeds can be driven from the age of 16 and having the AM-Category Driving License. If you get a car or motorcycle driving license you get the AM-Category included. There are 2 categories of mopeds: one with a maximum speed of 25 km/h (15 mph) (called snorfiets / snorscooter) and one with a maximum speed of 45 km/h (30 mph) (called bromfiets / brommer). Police regularly set ups random checkpoints with a portable dynamometer to check if passing mopeds are adhering to the maximum construction speed. As of 2018 all new mopeds should have EURO4 emission qualification to get registered for use on the road. The 25 km/h (15 mph) category has a blue license plate, occupants require a speed pedelec bike or motor helmet (NTA 8776) and have to use cycle side lanes. If electric powered they can also drive on segregated bike paths. On some 30 km/h(18 mph) roads in Amsterdam it is mandatory for all mopeds to use the carriageway instead of the cycle side lanes. The 45 km/h (30 mph) category has a yellow license plate, occupants are required to wear a motor helmet (ECE 22.05 or ECE 22.06). These mopeds always must use the carriageway, except when there is a compulsory moped-cycle side lane.
New Zealand	Mopeds can be driven with any class of driver license. Mopeds are classified as having an engine capacity not exceeding 50 cc (3.1 cu in) and a maximum speed not exceeding 50 km/h (31 mph). Electric mopeds must have a motor between 0.6 to 2 kilowatts (0.82 to 2.72 PS; 0.80 to 2.68 bhp). Mopeds do not require safety testing (known as a Warrant of Fitness in NZ) and are subject to lower licensing costs than motorcycles, though one still needs the right equipment (Helmet etc.). But the rider must license the moped (get plates etc.).
Norway	All motorcycles having less than 50 cc (3.1 cu in) (and some "Mopedcars") are limited to 45 km/h (28 mph) in Norway. All two-wheeled vehicles with more than 50 cc are considered motorcycles. You need to be 16 years old and have a license (expensive) to drive one. Mopeds have only a 25% VAT and are therefore fairly cheap. Sixteen-year-olds can also drive 125cc bikes, and the license is only slightly more expensive than a moped license. But the 125cc bikes/scooters get a tax of about 1000-1200 Euros AND 25% VAT on top of that. Hence they cost 2-3 times as much as a moped. Mopeds in Norway used to go at least 50 km/h (30 mph) (usually 55–65 km/h; 35 to 40 mph) before adaptation of EU regulations. With the 45 km/h (30 mph) speed limit tuning the engines are common. Until August 1, 2013, operators could have a passenger on if they were under 10 years old, but from this date, a passenger is no longer allowed.
Philippines	Many underbones, especially the Honda XRM and Honda Bravo, are modified, some are "pimped out" with stereo systems and neon lights, while others are tuned, even stripped to their frames, for illegal street racing. Others, however, are modified for aesthetics (ranging from only the bodywork to extensive modification, often to resemble a full superbike), or sometimes for usage as a transport capable vehicle (usually by the addition of a custom made side wagon). A moped (as any light motorcycle) is free to use but still requires a drivers license. However, mopeds and light motorcycles are not allowed to be used on the Manila highway or skyway system.
Poland	In Poland, a moped (called "motorower", from "motor bicycle"; this name also applies to scooters etc.) is a two- or three-wheeled motor vehicle that does not require the use of pedals, equipped with an engine of 50 cc (3.1 cu in) or less, with a maximum speed of no more than 45 km/h (28 mph) (artificially limited in some models). Prior to 19 January 2013, every person aged 18 or more was allowed to drive a moped without a license, only with an ID card. Every person who became of age before that date is allowed to drive a moped, but younger people must obtain an appropriate license (categories AM, A or B). This law resulted in dramatically lowered sales of mopeds and job offers (such as pizza delivery) for younger people lacking job experience or money for a driving license.
Portugal	In Portugal, a moped is a two- or three-wheel motor vehicle with an engine of 50 cc (3.1 cu in) or less, or having an engine with more than 50 cc but with a maximum speed of no more than 45 km/h (28 mph). Class M (moped) license is required to drive such vehicles. This license can be obtained with a minimum age of 14.
Russia	The moped (or easy-rider) is legally defined as a two- or three-wheeled vehicle with engine displacement of no more than 50 cc (3.1 cu in) and maximum speed of no more than 50 km/h (31 mph). Such vehicles now require licensing, at least type M. Pillion passengers are not allowed.
Slovenia	Mopeds are not allowed on highways. Required age is 14, but a specific license ("vozniško") is required. Owners of car or bike licenses may drive them freely. Registration (with plate) and insurance are mandatory. The law dictates all mopeds be restricted to 45 km/h (28 mph), but this is largely ignored and it is common for dealerships to sell them unrestricted if asked beforehand. Main manufacturer in Slovenia is Tomos
Spain	Mopeds are not allowed on highways. Helmets are mandatory. In Spain a moped is defined as a two- or three-wheeled motor vehicle with an engine of 50 cc (3.1 cu in) or less with a maximum speed of no more than 45 km/h (28 mph). The license needed for driving a moped is the 'AM' or Permiso de Conducir AM, which can be obtained at the age of 15 years. The driver is not allowed to transport passengers on the rear seat until 18 years of age.
South Africa	In South Africa a moped is defined as a scooter with a 50 cc (3.1 cu in) engine with a maximum speed of no more than 45 km/h (28 mph). There is no license needed for driving a moped and you can ride from the age of 16 years. The driver is not allowed to transport passengers on the rear seat until 18 years of age.
Sweden	Mopeds are available in two classes. Class I mopeds—also known as EU mopeds, as they were introduced to comply with European Union rules—are designed for a maximum speed of 45 km/h (28 mph) powered by an engine of 50 cc (3.1 cu in) or, if it has an electric motor, has a maximum power of 4.0 kW (5.44 PS; 5.36 bhp). A driver's license type A (motorcycle), or B (car), or a class I moped license (type AM, minimum age 15) is required to ride a class I moped. In traffic class I mopeds are regarded as motorcycles, but may not be driven on motorways or expressways, and must be registered and have a license plate. They are, however, tax free. Class II mopeds are designed for a top speed of 25 km/h (16 mph) and have an engine with maximum 1.0 kW (1.36 PS; 1.34 bhp). No license is required, but the driver has to be at least 15 years old, wear a helmet and either have passed a theory test or be born before October 1st 1994 (I.E.reached the age of 15 before the current regulation was introduced in 2009). In traffic they are regarded as bicycles and are allowed in the same places unless there are signs that explicitly forbid them. Mopeds registered before 17 June 2003, are called legacy mopeds, and are subject to the same rules as class II mopeds, but may have a top speed of 30 km/h (19 mph). For either class there is an exception to the helmet requirement if the moped has a cab/body and you are using a seat belt. Previously there used to be an exception for mopeds with specifically a reinforced fiber glass front, more or less intended for the three wheeled Norsjö/Forshaga Shopper, and later applied to the three wheeled Grecav Amica.
Switzerland	A moped is considered to be a two-wheeled vehicle that has pedals, a motor which is less than 50 cc (3.1 cu in) and a top speed of 30 km/h (19 mph). The moped must be registered, and must have a number plate with a sticker for that year indicating that the vehicle is road taxed and insured. Insurance is handled by the government. These vehicles are regarded bicycles in traffic and are therefore not allowed on motorways. To drive this vehicle, one must have a Category M license (which comes with every car and motorbike license) as well as a motorcycle helmet. A Category M license is obtainable at the age of 14. At the age of 16, one can obtain an A1 license to drive a 50 cc motorcycle which does not conform to the 30 km/h (19 mph) limit and therefore is not regarded as a bicycle anymore.
Thailand	The regulation of motorcycles in the city is different from the regulation for home use. Motorcycles in the city require payment of road tax and must have a valid license plate number. However, for home use, a motorcycle might not need to register and the motorcycle will only be able to be used in farms or a small town. Wearing a helmet is a must when riding on a major road and in the city. There is a maximum limit of one pillion riders on the bikes.
Turkey	All motorcycles having less than 50 cc (3.1 cu in) and are limited to 45 km/h (28 mph) considered as Mopeds. All two-wheeled vehicles with more than 50 cc are considered motorcycles. You need to be 16 years old and have a M class driver license to drive one. M class license cannot be obtained alone. When either A1 class or B class driver license is obtained the M class is obtained too. Mopeds can not be insured in Turkey unlike the motorcycles.
United Kingdom	1970s Yamaha FS1E The term moped (assigned category AM on a UK driving licence) describes any low-powered motor driven cycle with an engine capacity not greater than 50 cc (3.1 cu in) and a maximum design speed of no more than 45 km/h (28 mph). Before 19 January 2013, the speed restriction was 50 kilometres per hour (31 mph), and mopeds registered before 1 September 1977 were required to have pedal-assistance. A provisional licence, full motorcycle or car licence is needed to operate a moped. An additional Compulsory Basic Training (CBT) certificate is also required to ride a moped on public roads, except for anyone who obtained their full car driving licence before 1 February 2001 (though the UK Government recommends that all new riders take a CBT course). A provisional moped licence may be obtained at the age of 16, whereas standard car and motorcycles licences are only available at the age of 17. Provisional licences require learner plates and expire after two years if the licence holder has not passed a test, however it can be extended another two years by retaking the CBT. Mopeds are subject to all of the same traffic and vehicle regulation laws as other motor vehicles, including displaying a conforming rear registration plate. All motorised cycles, motorcycles and mopeds under 50 cc are prohibited from using UK motorways, due to their limited top speed of 30 miles an hour, meaning they are not able to drive safely among other vehicles.
United States	The French Motobécane "Moby" was a popular moped sold in the United States during the 1970s Prior to the 1970s, use of mopeds in the United States was relatively rare due to legal restrictions on the devices in many states. In 1972, Serge Seguin, after writing a masters thesis on the European moped, received two mopeds and a small amount of money from the French company Motobécane to promote the vehicle. After lobbying Congress on its fuel efficiency benefits, Seguin was able to get more than 30 states to devise a specific vehicle classification for mopeds. Produced by U.S. manufacturers such as American Machine and Foundry (AMF), mopeds had very small engines and often could not exceed 30 mph (48 km/h). What they could do, however, was run for up to 220 miles (350 km) on one tank of fuel. Because of the problems caused by the 1970s energy crisis, mopeds quickly became popular, with more than 250,000 people in the United States owning one in 1977. However, as gasoline prices eventually moved down, licensing laws took their toll, and automobile companies devised more efficient cars, the moped's popularity began to fade. Legal terms and definitions of low-powered cycles vary from state to state and may include "moped", "motorcycle", "motorbike", "motorized bicycle", "motor scooter", "scooter", "goped", "motor-driven cycle", and others. A moped's speed generally may not exceed 30 mph (48 km/h) on level ground, even if it is capable of going faster. In a few states this number is 20 or 25 mph (32 or 40 km/h), and in most states, the maximum engine capacity is 50 cc (3.1 cu in). However, Kansas ("Motorized Bicycle" K.S.A. 8–126, 8-1439a) allows up to 130 cc (7.9 cu in). Some states require pedals, while others do not.
Vietnam	Parts of Vietnam (e.g. the major cities of Hanoi and Ho Chi Minh City) are amongst the last places in the world where two-wheeled personal transport is more important than four-wheeled transport. Mopeds, underbones/scooters and motorcycles are everywhere, partly due to the narrow nature of many of the side streets and alleys.

== Sports moped ==
In the United Kingdom during the 1970s, a high-performance derivation of the moped concept was developed, aimed at 16-year-olds. It was created in order to circumvent governmental legislation aimed at forcing young motorcycle riders off the road. These new laws, called the "Sixteener Law", were introduced by John Peyton, the then Conservative Party Minister for Transport in 1971. They forbade 16-year-olds from riding motorcycles of up to 250 cc (15 cu in) capacity as they had done before, and limited them to 50 cc (3.1 cu in) machines until they were 17. The law provoked motorcycle manufacturers to develop new class of motorcycle which were then called "sports mopeds" or, colloquially, "sixteener specials" and was subject to much criticism. The market for these was primarily young males.

Sports mopeds were ostensibly 50 cc (3.1 cu in) motorcycles, capable of doing more than 50 mph (80 km/h) in some cases, with bicycle-style pedals added to them which the law required were capable of propelling the vehicle. Models were produced by Japanese manufacturers Honda, Yamaha and Suzuki, and European companies such as Puch, Fantic, Gilera, Gitane and Garelli from 1972 onwards, the most famous of which was the Yamaha FS1-E. They included roadsters, enduro and motocrossers, cafe racers and choppers or scooters, and led to a boom interest in motorcycling similar to the early 1960 rocker period. The government responded again by bringing in even more restrictive legislation in 1977 which limited mopeds to a weight of 250 kg (550 lb) and a top speed to 30 mph (48 km/h). The move contributed to the decline of the UK motorcycle market. In Continental Europe no such restrictions existed and such vehicles could be ridden by 14-year-olds.

== See also ==
- Daelim (Trac)
- E-Bike
- Honda
- Jawa Moto
- Moped Army
- Motobecane
- Personal transporter
- Peugeot
- Piaggio
- Puch
- Rabasa Cycles (Derbi)
- ZF Sachs
- Tomos
- Vespa
