= 100T =

100T may refer to:

- Yamaha RS-100T, a motorcycle
- Lotus 100T, a Formula One car
- 100 Thieves, an esports organization
