= Suzuki A100 =

Japanese motorcycle made beginning 1966

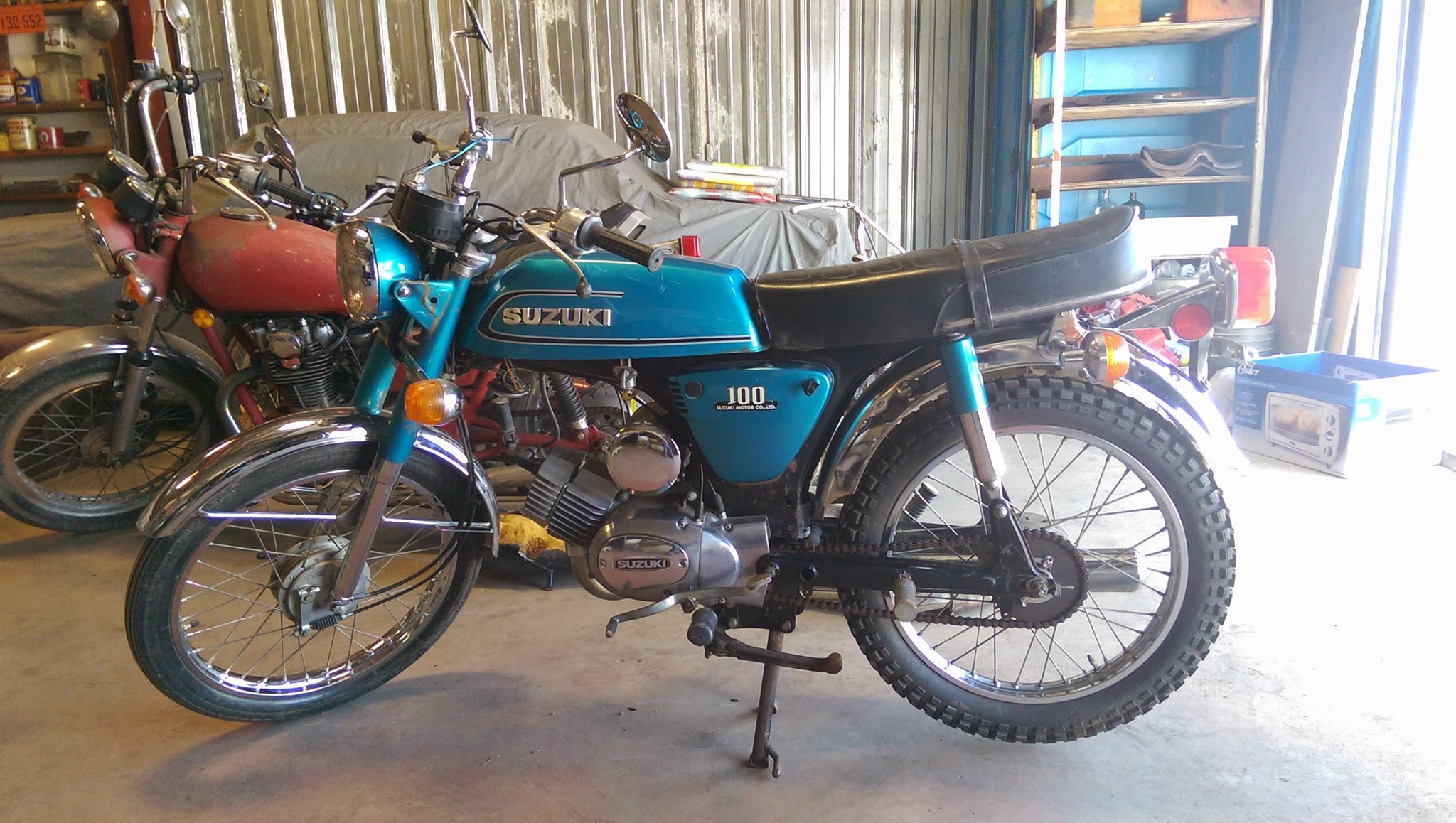
- 1975 Suzuki A100
- Manufacturer: Suzuki
- Predecessor: Suzuki A80
- Engine: 98 cc (6.0 cu in) two-stroke, rotary valve, single
- Bore / stroke: 50 mm × 50 mm (2.0 in × 2.0 in)
- Compression ratio: 6.5:1
- Power: 9.5 hp @ 7500 rpm
- Torque: 6.87 lb ft @ 6500 rpm
- Suspension: Front: Telescopic forks with hydraulic damping Rear: Swingarm with non-serviceable hydraulically damped shock absorbers
- Brakes: Drum
- Wheelbase: 1,200 mm (47 in)
- Weight: 83 kg (183 lbs) (dry)

The Suzuki A100 is a Japanese motorcycle from the Suzuki Motor Corporation with production starting in 1966.Similar models were produced by Yamaha and Kawasaki with the YB100 & KH100 models, also with a single-cylinder two-stroke engine and rotary valve being examples.

== Engine ==
The Suzuki A100 is powered by a 98 cc (6.0 cu in) rotary valve two-stroke single cylinder, air-cooled engine. The bore and stroke are each 50mm. The corrected compression ratio is 6.5:1. The engine produces 9.5 hp @ 7500 rpm and 6.87 lb ft of torque @6500 rpm. Top speed is close to 70 mph with fuel consumption an average of 95mpg.

A factory race tuning kit to convert the bike into one suitable for motocross competition use was available. Increasing engine performance to 17 hp @9,000rpm, it included a new cylinder with revised port timing, a modified disc valve with increased duration, new piston which relocated the piston ring end gaps away from snagging in the larger cylinder ports, new cylinder head with a modified combustion chamber, raising compression ratio and a new expansion chamber type exhaust system which was elevated to reduce off-road damage from obstacles.

The manual supplied with the kit also gives machining details to increase carburetor size as well as information on grinding the disc valve's opening to match the modified carb's larger bore. With these changes the bike requires premix two-stroke oil to the fuel in a 20:1 ratio. The CCI system is retained with the oil pump"s control cable removed with the very lowest delivery setting being sufficient to lubricate the left-hand crankshaft bearing.

Also in the kit is an instruction manual, braced & wider motocross style handlebar, a polythene oil tank for the crankshaft bearing and a frame reinforcement plate to be welded in behind the rear engine mountings. The bike's original flywheel generator was advised by Suzuki to be replaced with a smaller solid rotor from their motocross models as the crankshaft was prone to breaking with the heavier mass of the original flywheel/magneto if engine speed rose above 10,000rpm. The tuning manual also includes cylinder port dimensions so the modifications can be replicated on a standard component.

=== Fuelling ===
The Suzuki A100 is fitted with a single Mikuni VM 20 SC carburetor.

In contrast to a traditional two stroke engine where the induction of fuel/air is controlled by the piston covering and uncovering ports in the wall of the cylinder, the A100 utilizes a rotary valve system. This consists of a steel disk with windows cut into it attached to the crankshaft, which covers and uncovers a port machined into the engine casing. This allows asymmetric valve timing which reduces blowback of the fuel/air mixture when compared to piston-ported designs.

A replaceable paper element air filter is placed within the cylindrical housing between the engine's cylinder & frame.

=== Lubrication ===
Featuring the Suzuki C.C.I. (Crankcase-Cylinder-Injection) lubrication system, rather than adding two stroke oil with the gasoline, pumped oil is supplied from a side mounted tank to two points in the engine's crankcase. One of these is to the left-hand main crankshaft bearing. For this reason, premix cannot be run long term as this will eventually cause this bearing to fail owing to oil starvation. The Mikuni oil pump's delivery is a function of both the engine speed and the throttle position. Benefits of using the Suzuki C.C.I. system instead of premixing gasoline with oil include: a reduction visible exhaust smoke, the elimination of the need to premix as well as a reduction in carbon buildup which lengthens the interval between top-end and exhaust system decoke as well as an economy in oil usage. Suzuki recommends using Suzuki C.C.I. two stroke oil for the engine.

== Transmission ==
The transmission utilizes a 4-speed constant mesh gearbox and a wet multi-plate clutch with helical gear primary drive.

The final drive is protected from the elements and road dirt by a two part, pressed-steel enclosure. The Suzuki A100 Haynes manual lists the transmission gear ratios as follows:

Gear	Ratio
1st	2.91:1
2nd	1.87:1
3rd	1.39:1
4th	1.10:1

The final chain drive ratio is 2.46:1 accomplished through the use of a 32 and 13 tooth sprocket. The transmission is filled with 650cc of motor oil. Suzuki recommends using SAE 20W40 motor oil for the transmission.

== Frame ==
The monocoque frame of the A100 motorcycle is made of pressed steel halves, with electrically spot and seam welded construction. Corrosion can be an issue on some bikes.

== Electrical ==
The motorcycle uses a 6V electrical system to run the headlight and instrument illumination, with a 4Ah battery supplying the tail light, signal lights, brake light and horn. Charging is from the flywheel magneto generator and selenium solid-state rectifier. Bikes built for the Canadian and US markets have an ignition switch to force the headlight to be on whilst the motorcycle is running.

== Reception ==
In a comparison of the Suzuki A100, Kawasaki KH100, and Yamaha RS100 in the September 1976 issue, Bike magazine praised the durability, serviceability and practicality of the A100 as a commuter machine. However, it was given 3rd place in the comparison. The article concludes, "It's not that the Suzuki is a bad machine, just that the Kawasaki and the Yamaha provide the same commuting qualities, plus a genuine motorcycling experience." At the time the article was written, the Suzuki A100 could be purchased for £295.

A road test of the A100 in Motorcycle Mechanics Magazine published in 1973 also noted that the A100 was well suited as a runabout but lacked some performance. The magazine specifically called out the suspension system and braking performance as weak points of the motorcycle while praising its oil tightness and overall engine design and performance. The Suzuki A100 was finally replaced by the GP100 & GP125 models, although the A100 was still offered alongside the more modern looking GPs for a while.
