= Honda TMX =

Honda TMX 125/155 Honda TMX 125 Alpha Honda TMX Supremo 150
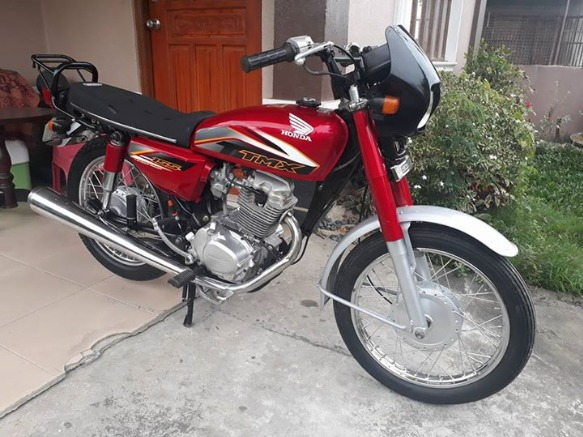
- Manufacturer: Honda Philippines, Inc
- Production: 1976–2014 (Honda TMX 125); 1981–2014 (Honda TMX 155); 2012–present (Honda TMX Supremo 150); 2014–present (Honda TMX 125 Alpha)
- Assembly: Tanauan, Batangas
- Predecessor: Honda TM 110; Honda TMS 110 Super; Honda TMS 125; Honda SR 125
- Class: Business-oriented (Utility); Standard
- Engine: 125/150/155 cc 4-stroke OHV (TMX Classic & TMX Alpha), SOHC (TMX Supremo); air-cooled, single
- Transmission: 4-speed (TMX 1st gen)/ 5-speed (TMX Supremo & Alpha) Manual; Constant Mesh
- Brakes: Front: drum Rear: drum
- Related: Honda S110; Honda CG125; Honda GL150

The Honda TMX or Tricycle Model Xtreme series is a line of motorcycles manufactured by Honda Motors Philippines since 1976. Produced for the Philippine market, it was designed for utility and tricycle use.

== Honda TMX 125/155 ==
The original Honda TMX line started production in 1985 as the Honda TM 110, a heavy-duty derivative of the Honda S110 designed for tricycle use. In 1981, a more powerful version, TMX 155, was also launched. The TMX 155 is a 155.3 cc four-stroke, OHV, air-cooled engine. It had a 4-down manual transmission and a primary kickstarter. The TMX 155 originally had contact point ignition, but was later changed to a magneto AC-CDI ignition in the later versions during its production time. A telescopic fork front suspension and twin rear suspension cushion the bumps on the road. In 1988, the TM 110 evolved into the TMS 110 Super, which became the TMS 125 later on. By 2003, the TMS 125 was redesigned and renamed to the TMX 125. Both the smaller displacement 125cc model and the bigger displacement 155cc model was discontinued in 2014 due to tightening emissions standards, with the final TMX 155 unit being painted in gold and with commemorative decals.

== Honda TMX 125 Alpha ==
The TMX 125 Alpha (stylized as TMX 125α) was launched in 2014 as a successor of the TMX 125. The motorcycle is essentially a rebadged Honda CG125. The TMX Alpha features a 124.11 cc four stroke, air-cooled OHV engine mated to a five-speed transmission instead of four, and it is started by an electric starter and a kick starter with decompression function.

The instrument panel features an analog tachometer with gear indicator which is absent in the older TMX 155. A bar-mounted kill switch and passing light switch (removed in later models) is added for safety, plus, new bar end weights were installed to lessen engine vibration. The 18-inch tires give the TMX 125 Alpha a taller stance, enabling it to adapt to various road conditions.

In 2021, the Honda TMX 125 Alpha received a major design overhaul, now featuring a matte silver color as the primary color scheme and lesser decals due to the popularity of the model as a base for Café racer and Scrambler bike builds, as well as a smaller rear wheel sprocket for daily commuting. Another notable change is the removal of the headlight switch, due to a house bill which mandates that all new motorcycles must have the headlights turned on upon startup.

== Honda TMX Supremo 150 ==
The Honda TMX Supremo 150 was launched in 2012 as a direct successor of the TMX 155. Like its 125cc counterpart, it is also rebadged from another Honda motorcycle model overseas, the Honda GL150. The new model now features a modern design to appeal newer generation of riders. The fuel tank was completely overhauled and is complemented by an elegant decal design and a new Dual Flat seat. The side cover has been improved and made more durable with the application of Polypropylene plastic (PP) material with security lock. In addition, it is now equipped with a factory installed 3-point side-car attachment.

The 150cc engine maintains its fuel efficiency up to 62km/L and is equipped with an electric starter with choke control located on the handle bar makes it easier for engine starting. It also has an illuminated meter panel that includes tachometer with gear shift indicator, and it is also equipped with a key shutter and an integrated handlebar lock to deter theft.

The TMX Supremo has undergone three generations since its introduction in 2012.

== See also ==
- Honda Wave
- Honda XRM
- List of Honda motorcycles
