= Honda Wave series =

Honda Wave
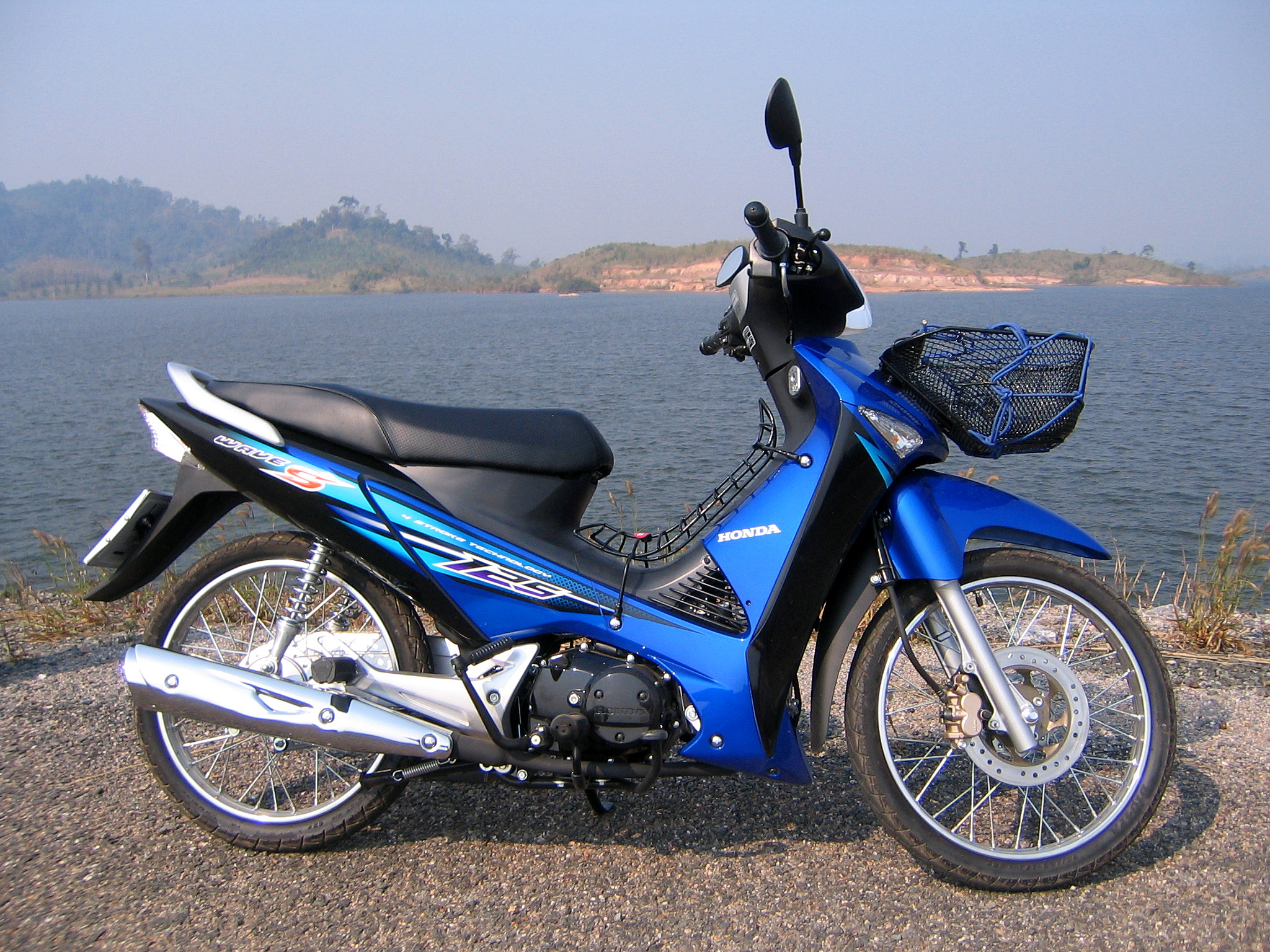
- Manufacturer: Honda
- Also called: Honda NF series (codename); Honda Wave (Malaysia, Philippines, Thailand, Vietnam); Honda Future (Vietnam, 125cc version); Honda Innova (Europe); Honda Supra (Indonesia, 125cc version); Honda Revo (Indonesia, 110cc version); Honda Blade (Indonesia, sporty variant of Revo with either 110cc or 125cc); Honda Wave S / Wave S-DX (in Argentina)
- Production: 1995–present
- Predecessor: Honda Super Cub; Honda Dream EX5
- Class: Underbone
- Engine: 100/110/125 cc SOHC 2-valve 4-stroke, air-cooled, single cylinder
- Transmission: 4 speed semi-automatic, wet multi-plate clutch working with wet centrifugal clutch , rotary shift
- Suspension: Front: telescopic fork Rear: swingarm with double shock absorber Special model come with single rear suspension
- Brakes: Front: Disc, Rear: Drum.
- Tires: 70/90-17M/C 38P and 80/90-17M/C 50P
- Wheelbase: 1.227 mm
- Dimensions: L: 1.897 mm W: 706 mm H: 1.083 mm
- Weight: 101 kg (dry)
- Fuel capacity: 3.7 L (0.81 imp gal; 0.98 US gal) (100); 4 L (0.88 imp gal; 1.1 US gal) (110/125)
- Related: Honda Cub; Honda Grom; Honda Nice; Honda Sonic; Honda XRM; Honda RS 150/Honda RSX/Honda Winner X

The Honda Wave, also marketed as the Honda NF series (codename), Honda Innova in Europe, and Honda Supra in Indonesia, is a series of motorcycles manufactured by Honda that debuted in 1995 with an underbone design, having separate cosmetic plastic body panels over a structural steel tube chassis. The Wave series succeeds the Super Cub which used pressed steel frame acting as both the structural chassis and cosmetic bodywork. It serves as the Southeast Asian model of the historic Honda Cub.

The Wave is available with three displacements—100 cc, 110 cc and 125 cc. The 100 and 110 cc models' engine is physically similar in size to the Cub engine, sharing mountings, while the 125 cc models use a larger engine, incompatible with the Cub and 100/110 mountings. In addition to the three models that use carburetors, Honda also produces the fuel-injected model starting in 2008 for 110 cc and 125 cc models. The 100 cc model was discontinued in 2008, except in Laos where it's still produced and sold in 2020.

In 2006, the Wave received a facelift. In addition, the 125 cc model includes a key slot cover for better protection against theft. Starting from 2007, the Innova 125 in Europe began using fuel injection system to replace the carburetors used by most of the Wave series.

In Indonesia, the 110 cc model is marketed as the Honda Revo, and unlike the original Wave 110, it was not offered in the market until 2008, when it replaced the previous 100 cc model, known as Supra Fit. A sporty variant called Honda Blade is launched alongside 110cc variant of Honda Revo, however, Honda Blade was discontinued in 2019 due to low demand.

== Features of Honda Wave series ==
- Fuel injection (Wave 110i and Wave 125i only). In Indonesia, fuel injection models is known as Revo/Blade FI and Supra X 125 FI, respectively.
- Front disc brake (standard for 125 and 110, optional for 100) (only on wave S-DX version on Argentina)
- Roller-bearing rocker arms to reduce friction at the rocker arms (125 cc model only)
- Heavy-duty ceramic coated piston (125 cc model only)
- Digital odometer and fuel tank (standard for certain pre 2013 125 cc models)
- Gear shift indicator
- Under-seat storage compartment (known as U-box by Honda)
- Mounting points for front basket

== Design rights issues ==
The Wave's simple design has been copied by manufacturers in China and elsewhere, to the point of parts interchangeability with the Wave. The Philippines National Bureau of Investigation, in response to a complaint filed by Honda, has conducted raids against several establishments selling clones of Honda motorcycles.

== Gallery ==
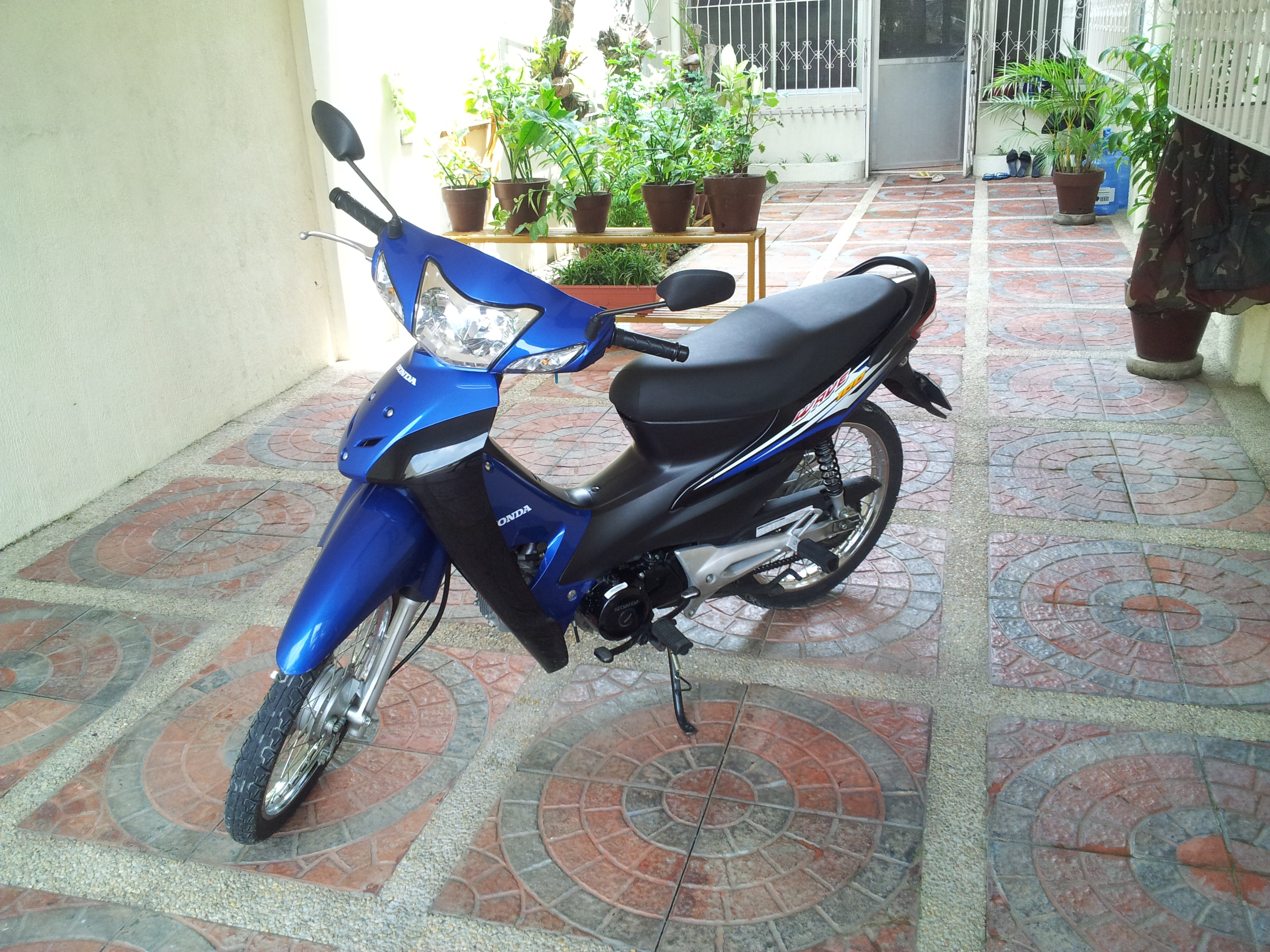
A facelifted Honda Wave 100 in the Philippines.

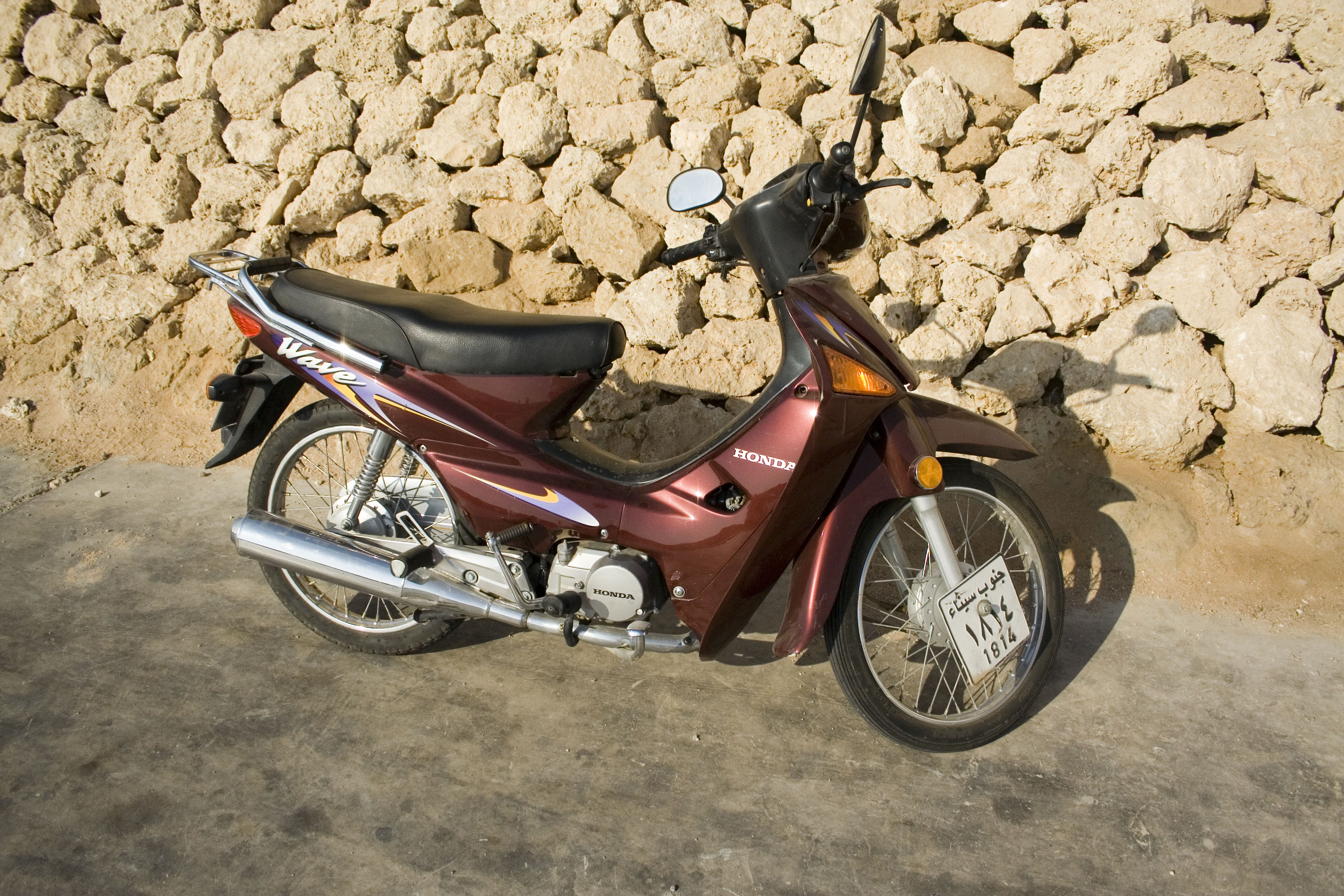
Honda Wave in Egypt.

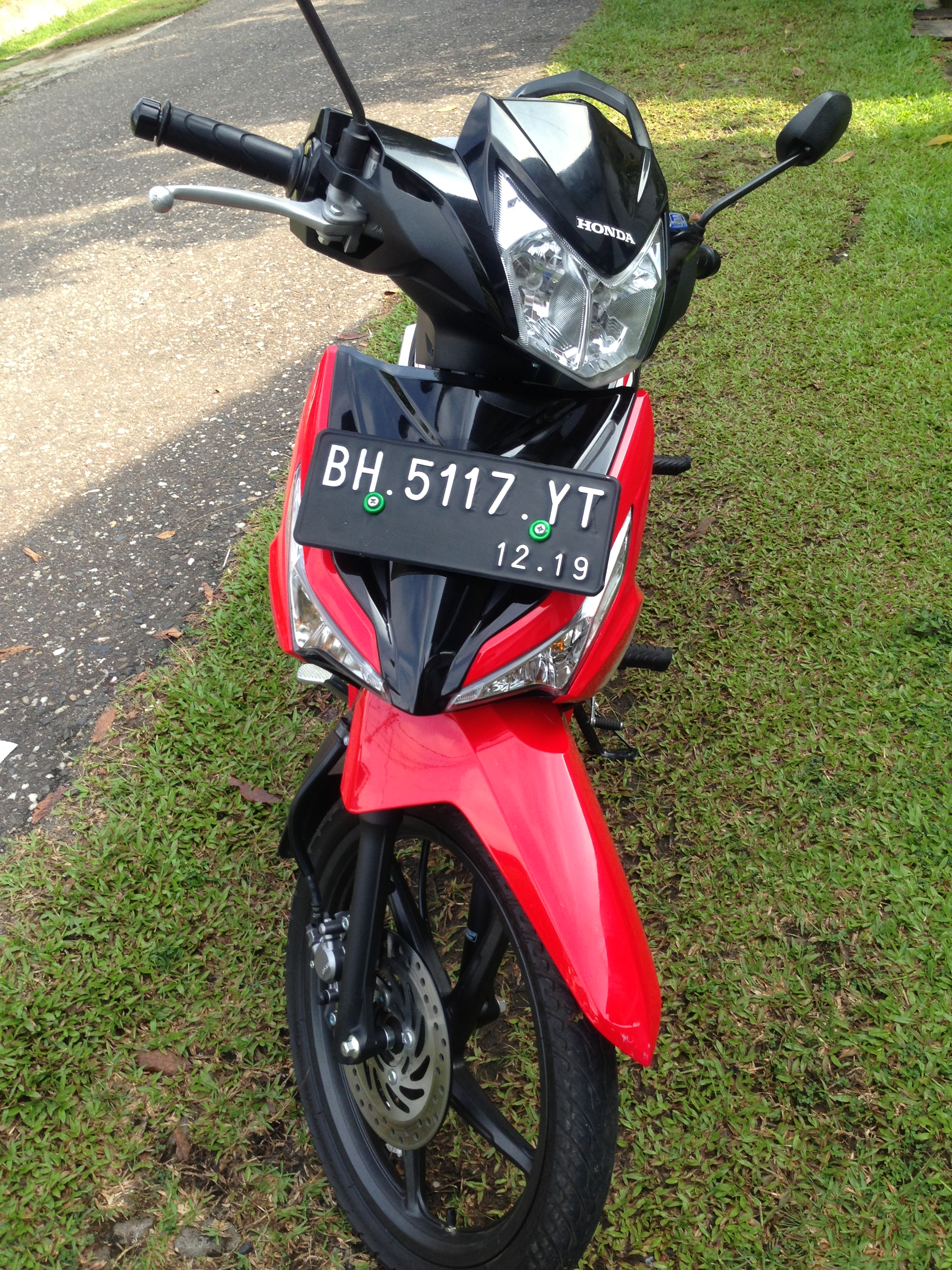
2014 Honda Supra X 125 FI in Indonesia.

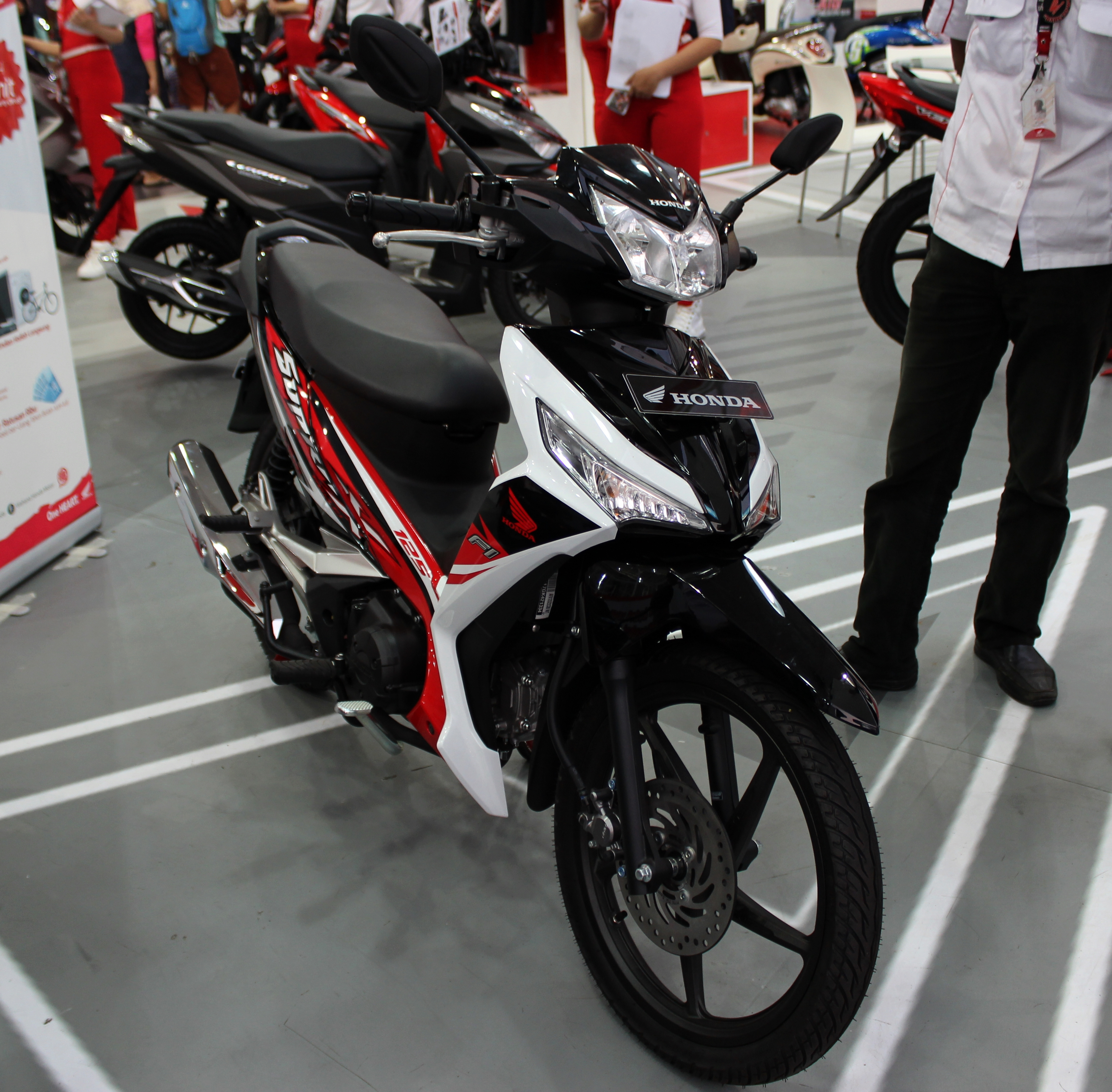
2016 Honda Supra X 125 FI at the 2016 Jakarta Fair, Indonesia.

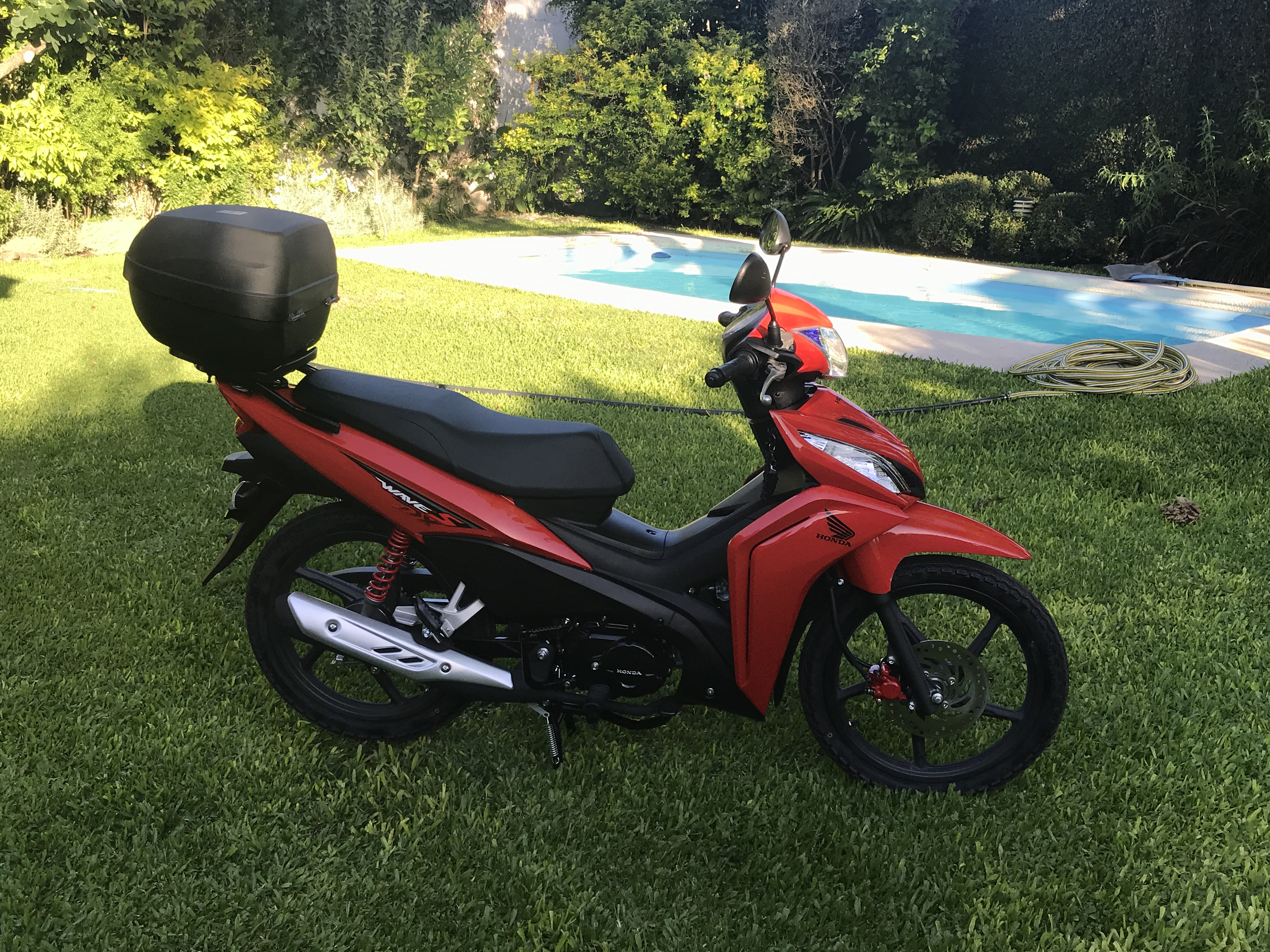
2023 Honda Wave S-DX in Argentina

== See also ==
- Honda XRM
- Honda Bravo
