= Yamaha RS-100T =

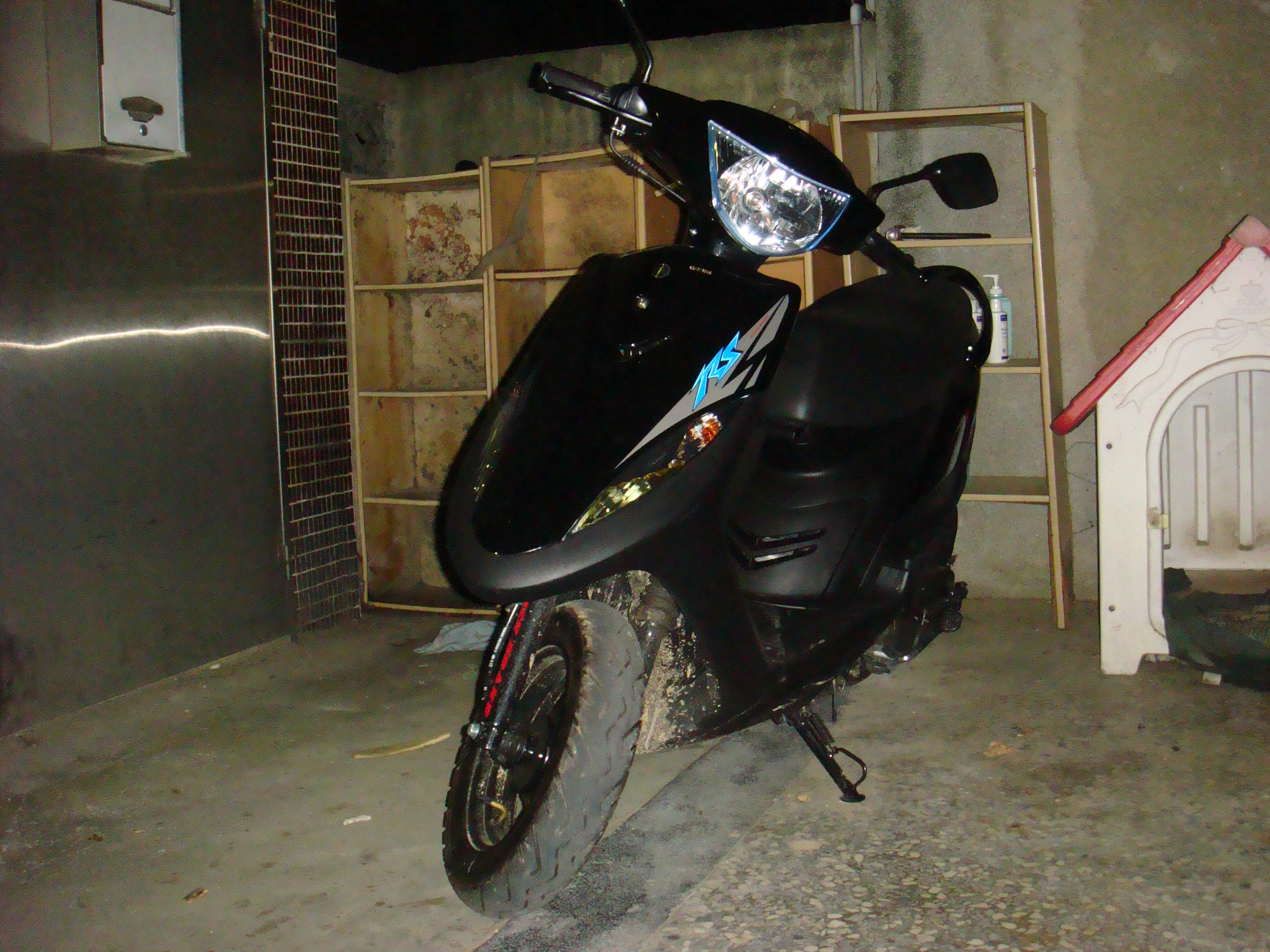
- Yamaha RS-100
- Manufacturer: Yamaha
- Also called: RS-100
- Production: 1977-2005
- Assembly: Japan
- Predecessor: Yamaha L2GF
- Successor: Yamaha YTX
- Class: Two-stroke motorcycle
- Engine: 97 cc (5.9 cu in), single cylinder two stroke engine
- Bore / stroke: 52.0 mm × 45.6 mm (2.05 in × 1.80 in)
- Compression ratio: 6.7:1
- Top speed: 100km/h
- Ignition type: Kick starter
- Brakes: Front: Drum; Rear: Drum
- Wheelbase: 1,195 mm (47.0 in)
- Dimensions: L: 1,860 mm (73 in)
- Seat height: 780 mm (31 in)
- Weight: 96 kg (212 lb) (dry)
- Fuel capacity: 7.5 L (2.0 US gal)
- Related: Yamaha RS110F
- Ground clearance: 150 mm (5.9 in)

Yamaha RS-100T Torque induction series, also known as RS-100 series, is a series of two-stroke motorcycle models manufactured by Yamaha Motors Co. Ltd as a successor of the Philippines' most popular 2T motorcycle/tricycle model. It debuted in 1977 especially for the Asian market (although it is identical with the original design of the RS-100 as produced for other markets from 1974 to 1977). While the older Yamaha RS-100 uses a pressed steel frame that also acts as the main body, the RS-100T uses steel tubes for the frames and metal cover sets for the body.

The Yamaha RS-100T comes in three displacement options - scooters, 100cc and 135cc. In addition to the three models that use carburetors, Yamaha also produces the fuel-injected 83cc model known as Yamaha.

By 2004, the RS-100T was succeeded by a more efficient and environmentally friendly Yamaha STX four-stroke motorcycle. In addition, the 150cc model includes a key slot cover for better protection against theft. Starting from 2007, the Yamaha STX in Philippines began using fuel injection system to replace the carburetors used by most of the Yamaha series.

== Specification ==
- Manufacturer Yamaha
- Production 1977–2005
- Engine 83-93cc 2-stroke air-cooled
- Power 9.3 PS @ 5,741 rpm (83 cc carburetor type), 9,18 PS @ 5,741 rpm (93 cc fuel injection type)
- Torque 1.15 kgf.m @ 3,456 rpm 100 cc 2T type, 0.73 kgf.m /5.000 rpm (100 cc fuel injection type)
- Transmission 4-speed
- Suspension Front: Telescopic fork
- Rear: Swingarm
- Fuel capacity 9 L
- Related Yamaha RXT135 and Yamaha L2GF

== Yamaha RS-100T w/ sidecar ==
Most tricyclists afford Yamaha RS-100T nowadays, Yamaha RS-100T produced more than 2,000,000 motorcycles in the world especially in the Philippines. Since 1980, the Yamaha RS-100T was introduced starting P25,000 ($500) until the year mid 1990s the Yamaha RS-100T was the best-seller 2T tricycle in the Philippines.

Top speed: 48 km/h.

== First generation (1977-1985) ==
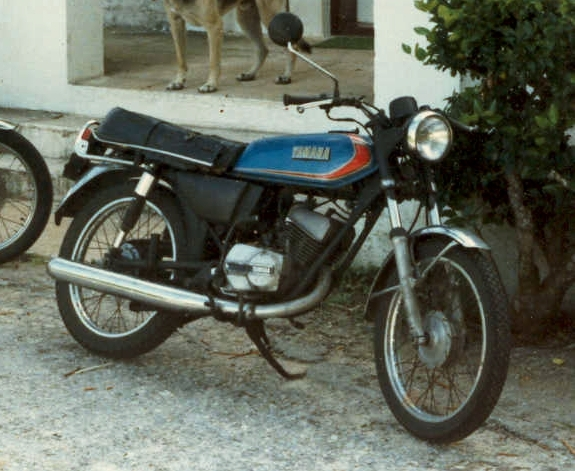
1977 Yamaha RS100

The first generation of Yamaha RS-100T was introduced in 1979, starting at $500. In the Philippines, only few Yamaha RS-100T tricycles were released, because most tricyclists at the time are already using Yamaha L2GF motorcycles and until now, few of them are used Yamaha L2GF.

== Second Generation (1986-1990) ==
Most tricycles were RS-100T models in 1986, they were released from Japan and delivered in the Philippines.

== Third Generation (1990-2005) ==
In 1990's, the third generation RS-100T model was still the same until the end of the decade. It was the best-seller two-stroke motorcycle in the Philippines until 1999. Over 3 million Yamaha RS-100T motorcycles were produced until it was phased out in 2005.

== Specifications ==
Yamaha RS-100T Torque Induction

- Engine type: Two-stroke, air-cooled 100cc engine
- Displacement: 100.3 cc
- Bore x Stroke: 46.4 x 59.9 mm
- Compression Ratio: 9,3:1
- Max Power: 9.3 PS @ 6,000 rpm (carburetor type), 9,18 PS @ 7.500 rpm (fuel injection type)
- Max Torque: 1.03 kgf.m @ 4,000 rpm (carburetor type), 0,99 kgf.m /5.000 rpm (125 cc fuel injection type)
- Max speed: 105 km/h (single),30–62 km/h (tricycle)
- Transmission: 4-speed
- Clutch: Wet multi-plate centrifugal
- Starter: Kick starter
- Frame Type: Underbone steel tube
- Suspension (F): Telescopic
- Suspension (R): Swingarm
- Brake (F): Mechanically actuated drum
- Brake (R): Leading trailing drum/Disc (for some Supra X 125 models in Indonesia)
- Fuel tank capacity: 9 L
- Fuel system: YamahaPGM-FI (RS-100T, RXT135, RXZ100 and 2007 Yamaha STX only); carburetors (all other models)
- Performance:0–60 km/h = 6.76 seconds(single) - 0–60 km/h = 20.23 seconds (with sidecar)

== See also ==
- TODA, a group of tricycle drivers in The Philippines
- Honda TMX
- Yamaha motorcycles
- 2-stroke
- 4-stroke
- Auto Rickshaw
- Santa Rosa, Laguna
