= Honda Bravo =

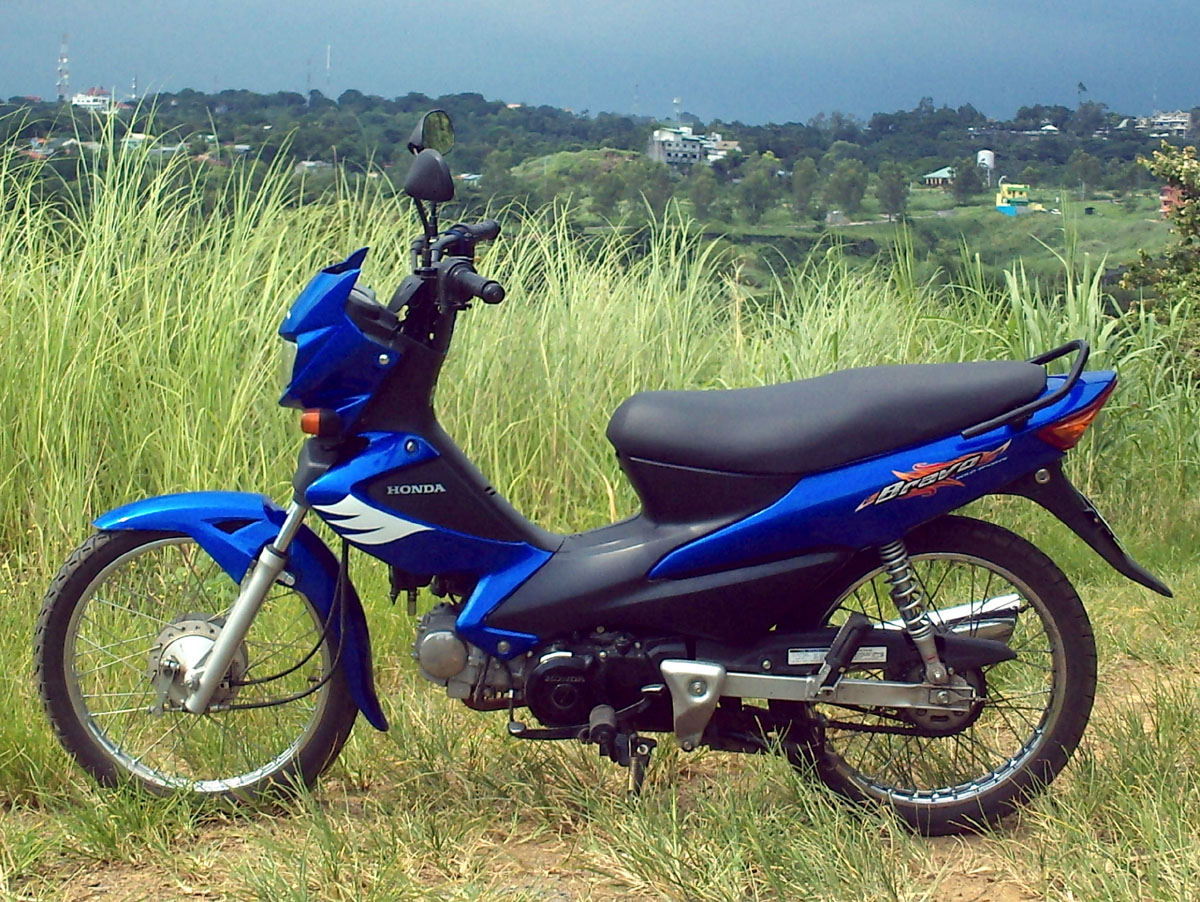
- Honda Bravo
- Manufacturer: Honda
- Production: 2006–2010
- Class: Underbone
- Engine: 100 cc (6.1 cu in), four-stroke, OHC, air-cooled, single
- Transmission: 4-speed rotary type
- Brakes: Front: drum Rear: drum
- Seat height: 764 mm (30.1 in)
- Weight: 89 kg (196 lb) (dry)
- Fuel capacity: 3.7 L (0.81 imp gal; 0.98 US gal)
- Related: Honda XRM

The Honda Bravo is a four-stroke 100 cc (6.1 cu in) underbone class motorcycle designed and manufactured in the Philippines. The frame and engine of the Honda Bravo is the same as the Honda Wave 100 of Thailand, and they differ only in the plastic body fairings. This motorcycle is related to the Honda XRM, which is also designed and manufactured in the Philippines. It uses an aluminium engine.
