= Honda XRM =

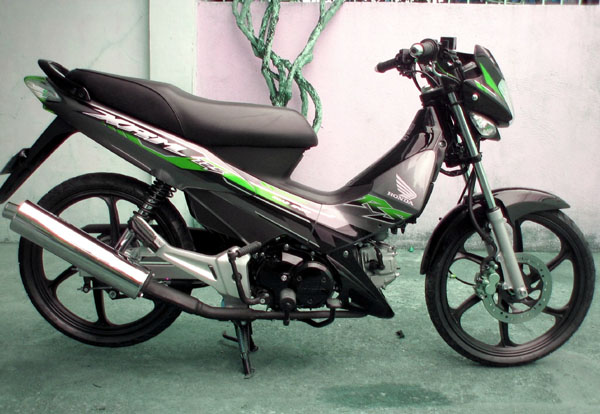
- Honda XRM 125 RS
- Manufacturer: Honda
- Production: 2001–present
- Class: Underbone; Farm bike (Utility, New Zealand)
- Engine: 125cc, Four-stroke, OHC, air-cooled, single
- Transmission: 4-speed rotary manual
- Brakes: Front: disc, single piston caliper Rear: drum (DS; RS125), disc (DSX; Motard)
- Seat height: 676 mm (26.6 in)
- Weight: 94.2 kg (208 lb) (dry)
- Fuel capacity: 3.8 L (0.84 imp gal; 1.0 US gal)
- Related: Honda Bravo; Honda Sonic

The Honda XRM is an underbone-style motorbike produced and sold in the Philippines since 2001 by Honda Philippines, Inc. The Honda XRM was originally released with a 110 cc (6.7 cu in) engine, but was later changed to a 125 cc (7.6 cu in) engine taken from the Honda Wave. It is designed for both on- and off-road use.

The XRM also spawned a non-off-road variant (later a separate model) called XRM 125 RS (where RS means Road Sport) which was later re-launched into a separate model as the RS 125 Fi. It still share most of major components with the XRM such as the chassis and the engine, with major differences in body style and overall appearance to resemble more closely with the unrelated Honda RS 150R. This variant was also sold in Thailand as the Honda Nice. In September 2026, Honda Philippines, Inc. announced the discontinuation of the RS 125. Coinciding with this, a special edition variant of the RS 125, dubbed the "Final Edition", will be sold through March 2028 with 20,000 units to be built.

Since 2021, it was sold in New Zealand as a non-street legal farm bike.

Its flexibility on modifications, and readily available parts and accessories have made the Honda XRM popular, particularly with the underbone riding culture, with numerous rider clubs being formed across the country. These modifications (especially to the handlebars and wheels) can pose danger, as they are not included in the product's engineering, and often defeat the "dual-sport" nature of the motorbike.

The Honda Bravo is a derivative of the Honda XRM designed for city use, but it carries the same frame that is used by NF100 (Wave100 - both models) not the frame of the XRM.

== Gallery ==
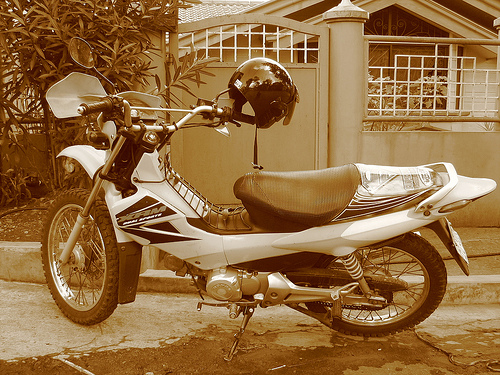
A Honda XRM with modified seat cover

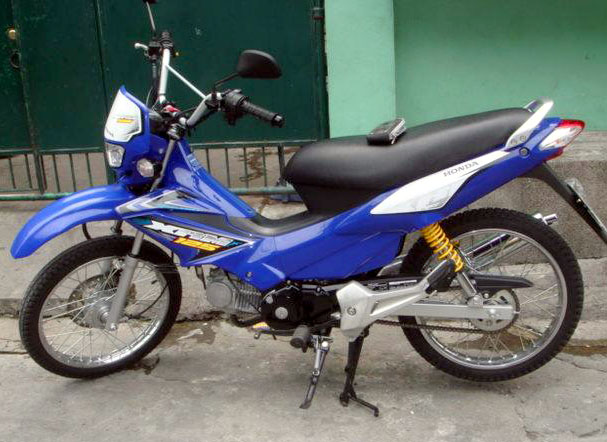
Honda XRM 125

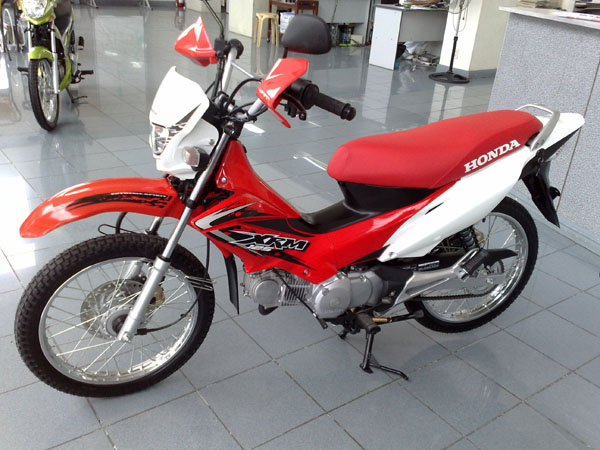
Honda XRM 3nity 125 Off Road
