= Yuniesky Betancourt =

Cuban baseball player (born 1982)

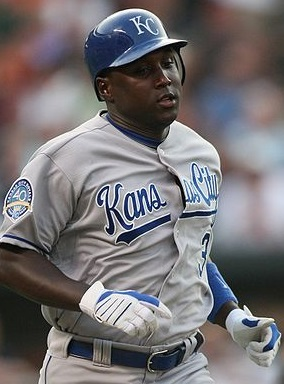
- Betancourt with the Kansas City Royals in 2009
- Shortstop
- Born: January 31, 1982 (age 44); Santa Clara, Cuba
- Batted: Right Threw: Right

Professional debut
- MLB: July 28, 2005, for the Seattle Mariners
- NPB: March 28, 2014, for the Orix Buffaloes

Last appearance
- MLB: September 29, 2013, for the Milwaukee Brewers
- NPB: May 14, 2014, for the Orix Buffaloes

MLB statistics
- Batting average: .261
- Home runs: 80
- Runs batted in: 457

NPB statistics
- Batting average: .141
- Home runs: 0
- Runs batted in: 4
- Stats at Baseball Reference

Teams
- Seattle Mariners (2005–2009); Kansas City Royals (2009–2010); Milwaukee Brewers (2011); Kansas City Royals (2012); Milwaukee Brewers (2013); Orix Buffaloes (2014)
Medals
Men's baseball
Representing Cuba
World Junior Baseball Championship
Bronze medal – third place	2000 Edmonton	Team

Yuniesky Betancourt Pérez (born 31 January 1982) is a Cuban former professional baseball shortstop. Betancourt played in Major League Baseball (MLB) for the Milwaukee Brewers, Seattle Mariners, and Kansas City Royals. He played in the Cuban National Series for Villa Clara before he defected from Cuba. In 2019, he became the first former MLB player to return to the Cuban national baseball system after defecting from the country. However, he never played a game for Villa Clara in 2019. In Cuba, he is nicknamed "Riquimbili".

== Cuban leagues ==
His early career was spent in the Cuban leagues, including Villa Clara of the Serie Nacional. He was considered the fastest second baseman in the Cuban leagues and the star of the Villa Clara team. In the finals against the Industriales in 2002, he got a hit in nearly every at bat, though the Industriales won, 4 games to 0. He left Cuba on a speedboat in December 2003 and ended up in Mexico, where he played for a while before signing with Seattle Mariners scouts Bob Engle and Patrick Guerrero on 26 January 2005. He made his major league debut on 28 July, 2005.

== Professional career ==
=== Seattle Mariners (2005–09) ===
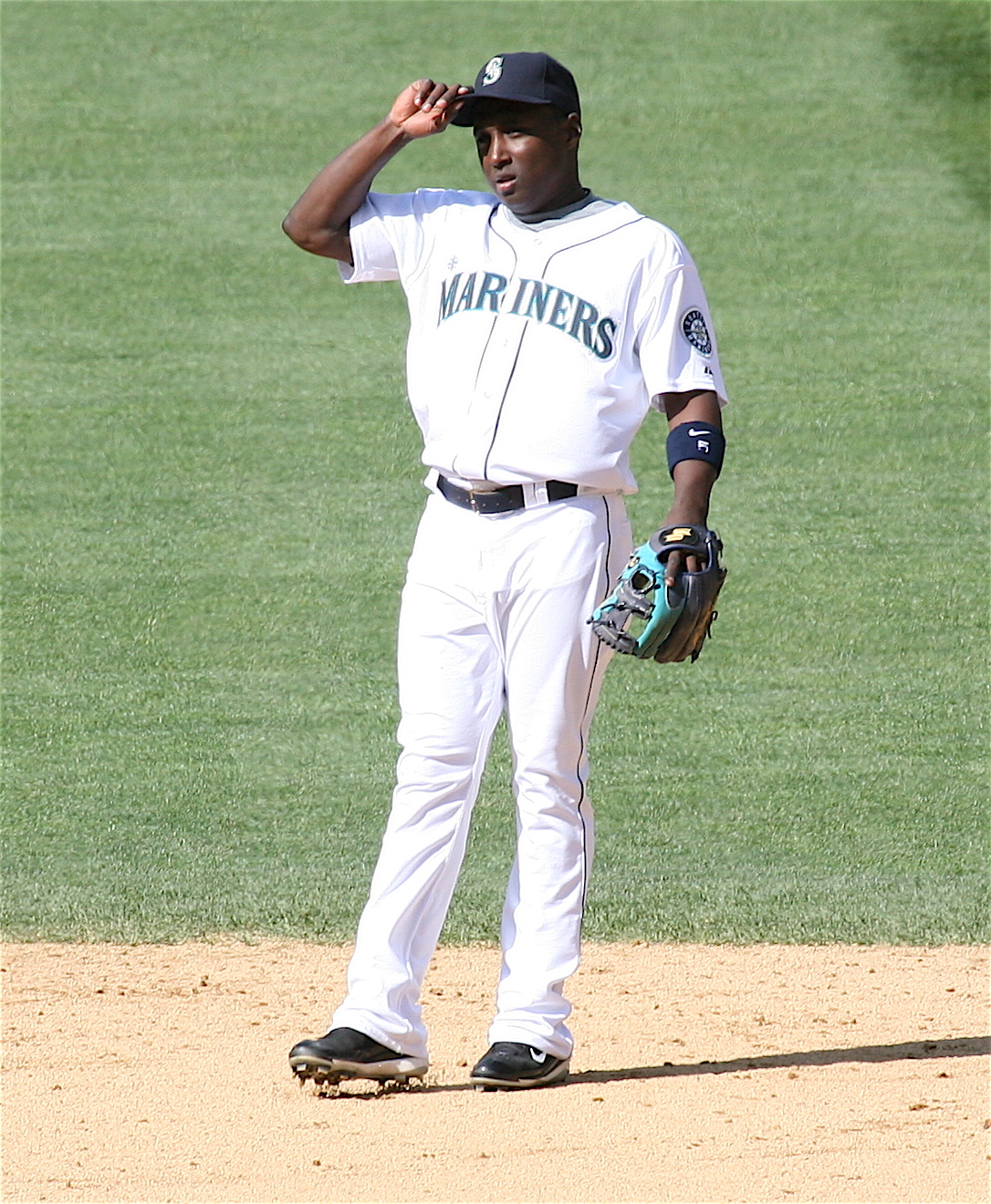
Betancourt playing for the Seattle Mariners in 2007.

Betancourt's initial calling card had been his fielding. In his first few seasons, he had been considered one of the best fielders in the game, combining excellent range, quickness, soft hands, hand-eye coordination, and a strong, accurate throwing arm. He was named one of the top fielders in baseball in a 2006 online fan's poll. In 2007, he made many good fielding plays; however, he suffered through spells of throwing wildness that season. Bad throws accounted for most of his 18 errors in the first half of 2007, almost as many as his 2006 total of 20. He turned things around and made only 5 errors in the second half of 2007. His defense suffered in 2008, with several fielding metrics calling him one of the worst shortstops in baseball.

Betancourt has been a hitter with some gap power who rarely strikes out or walks. He has been criticized for his lack of plate discipline and inability to bunt. In 2006, he walked only 3.0% of the time, the second-worst percentage in Major League Baseball. However, he only struck out 9.7% of the time, one of the top 20 percentages.

Betancourt was among the league leaders in batting with runners in scoring position and game-winning RBI in 2007. In a late season game in 2007, former Mariner Mike Blowers referred to Betancourt as being "unreal" when batting with runners on in close late games-a result at odds with his career statistics. He hit his first grand slam in a 7–6 win against the Chicago White Sox on 11 August 2007.

In 2008, he again walked only 3.0% of the time, the worst percentage in Major League Baseball. His strikeout rate dropped to 7.5%. He also saw the fewest pitches per plate appearance of all major leaguers, 3.15.

=== Kansas City Royals (2009–10) ===
On 10 July 2009, he was acquired by the Kansas City Royals along with a portion of his salary for Minor League pitchers Derrick Saito and Dan Cortes.

In 2009, he had the lowest on-base percentage of any starter in the major leagues, at .274, and the lowest slugging percentage in the American League with .351.

In 2010, he hit an opening day home run off Detroit Tigers pitcher Justin Verlander, and went on to finish the season with a career-high 16 home runs. Many of his other statistics, including his batting average, on-base percentage, and fielding percentage, increased slightly from his 2009 numbers.

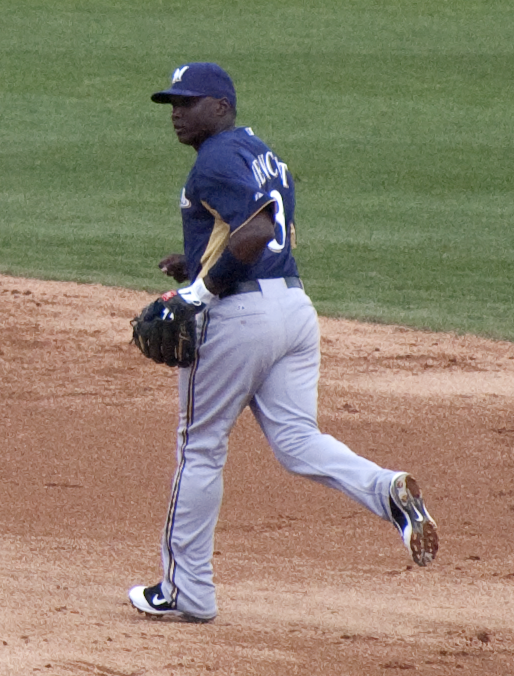
Betancourt during Brewers Spring Training in 2011

=== Milwaukee Brewers (2011) ===
On 19 December 2010, Betancourt was traded to the Milwaukee Brewers along with teammate Zack Greinke and US$2,000,000, reportedly to offset the buyout of Betancourt's club option in 2012, for Alcides Escobar, Lorenzo Cain, Jeremy Jeffress, and Jake Odorizzi.

In 2011, he batted .252 with a .271 on-base percentage, and led the NL in sacrifice flies, with 10. He saw the fewest pitches per plate appearance of all major league ballplayers with 512 or more plate appearances, at 3.16.

Betancourt hit his first career postseason home run on 9 October 2011 in a 9–6 win over the St. Louis Cardinals in Game 1 of the NLCS.

Despite having the lowest on-base-percentage of any qualifying shortstop in baseball, he started a majority of the games for the Brewers. Against the Padres on 9 May 2011, Betancourt had one of the most acrobatic double plays of the season, as he turned a ball hit up the middle into a running, behind-the-back toss to Rickie Weeks as they turned the double play. Nevertheless, he posted below average defensive marks by a number of advanced metrics.

=== Return to Kansas City (2012) ===
On 20 December 2011, Betancourt signed a one-year deal to return to Kansas City worth $2 million. He was released by the Royals on 14 August, becoming a free agent. He had played in 57 games, starting 51, with a .228 average and .256 OBP.

=== Philadelphia Phillies (2013) ===
On 28 January 2013, Betancourt signed a minor league deal with the Philadelphia Phillies with an invitation to spring training. On 24 March 2013 the Phillies released Betancourt.

=== Return to Milwaukee (2013) ===
On 26 March 2013, pending a physical, Betancourt signed a 1-year deal to return to the Milwaukee Brewers. In the first few weeks of the season, he was the MLB leader in home runs. He played 137 games with a slash line of .212/.240/.355. His batting average and on-base percentage were the worst of his career, and his slugging percentage was well below his career average of .388. He would never appear in the MLB again after 2013.

Throughout his MLB career, Betancourt directly earned approximately $16 million.

=== Orix Buffaloes ===
On 28 January 2014 Betancourt signed a 1-year deal with the Orix Buffaloes of Nippon Professional Baseball. On 22 July 2014 he was released from the Orix Buffaloes with an injury.

=== Toros de Tijuana ===
On 21 April 2015, Betancourt signed with the Toros de Tijuana of the Mexican Baseball League. He was released on 29 April 2015. In 21 games he hit .250/.300/.347 with 1 home run, 9 RBIs and 1 stolen base.

=== Leones de Yucatán ===
On 10 April 2017, Betancourt signed with the Leones de Yucatán. In 50 games he hit .270/.295/.319 with 1 home run and 24 RBIs.

=== Guerreros de Oaxaca ===
On 11 March 2018, Betancourt was traded to the Guerreros de Oaxaca. In 56 games he hit .406/.426/.558 with 4 home runs, 49 RBIs and 5 stolen bases.

== Return to Cuba and later life ==
In late March 2019, it was reported that Betancourt had successfully repatriated and joined the Santa Clara team in the Villa Clara Provincial League. He thus became the first Cuban ex-MLB player to return to the Cuban national baseball system. Betancourt is expected to rejoin Villa Clara for the 2019–20 Cuban National Series, as he has previously stated a desire to finish his career playing for his hometown team.

On April 15, 2024, Betancourt was arrested after being accused of defrauding Chicago-based insurance provider Kemper in Florida. He and three others were charged with filing false insurance claims, an organized scheme to defraud, faking an accident, and third-degree grand theft.

== See also ==
- List of baseball players who defected from Cuba
