= Hudspith =

Hudspith is a surname. Notable people with the surname include:

- Geoff Hudspith, creator of the Hudspith Steam Bicycle
- Karl Hudspith (born 1988), British rower and scientist
- Mark Hudspith (born 1969), British long-distance runner

== See also ==
- Hudspeth (surname)
