= Honda SH50 =

Honda SH50 H and K models
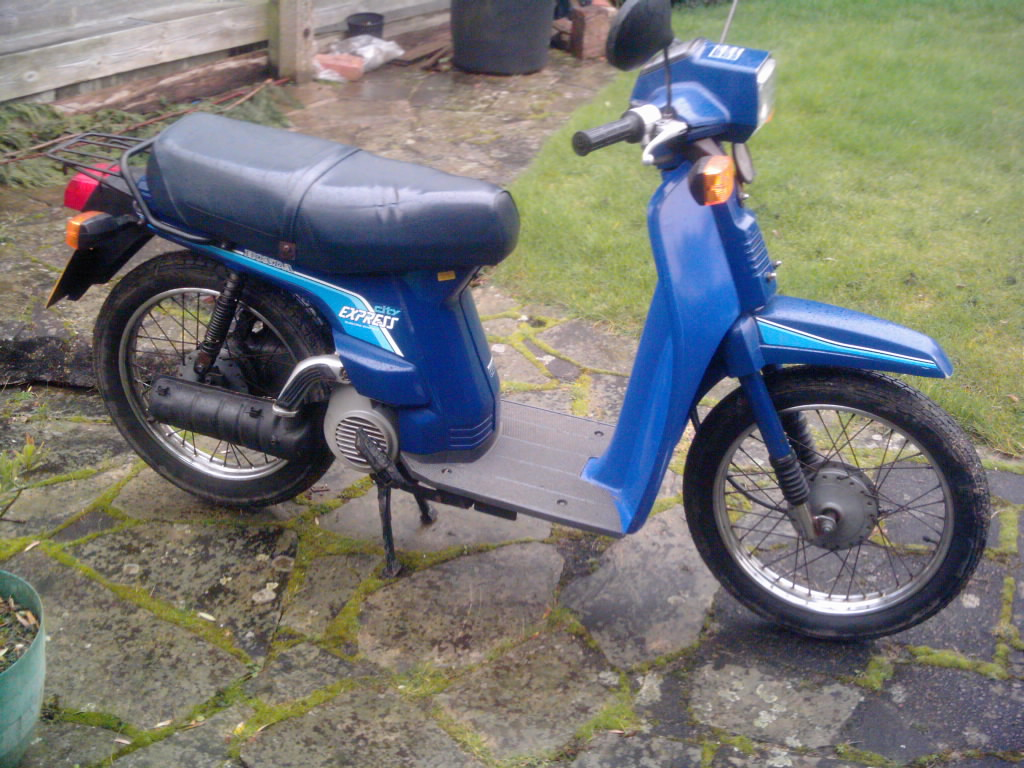
- Honda SH50-H 1989
- Manufacturer: Honda Motor Company
- Also called: Scoopy; City Express
- Production: 1984–1996
- Assembly: Barcelona, Spain
- Class: Moped
- Engine: 49 cc (3.0 cu in), air-cooled, two stroke, single
- Bore / stroke: 40.0 mm × 39.3 mm (1.57 in × 1.55 in)
- Compression ratio: 7:1
- Top speed: 50 km/h (31 mph)
- Power: 3.1 hp (2 kW; 3 PS) @ 5,500 rpm
- Torque: 3.1 lb–f @ 3,500 rpm
- Ignition type: Capacitor discharge electronic ignition; electric and kick start
- Transmission: Centrifugal clutch/variable ratio belt drive (Honda V-Matic transmission)
- Frame type: Tubular front section; pressed steel main section
- Suspension: Telescopic coil sprung front, Twin hydraulic shock absorber rear
- Brakes: Drum front and rear
- Tyres: 1.50-16
- Wheelbase: 1.218 m (48.0 in)
- Dimensions: L: 1.815 m (71.5 in); W: .692 m (27.2 in); H: 1.048 m (41.3 in)
- Seat height: .75 m (30 in)
- Weight: 71 kg (157 lb) (dry)
- Fuel capacity: 4.50 L (0.99 imp gal; 1.19 US gal)
- Ground clearance: .140 m (5.5 in)

The Honda SH50 is a 49 cc (3.0 cu in), air-cooled, two stroke, single cylinder, scooter style, restricted moped manufactured by the Honda Motor Company between 1984 and 2006, with substantial revisions for the 1996 model year. It was equipped with continuously variable automatic transmission, (Honda V-Matic transmission) together with both electric and kick start, automatic choke and capacitor discharge electronic ignition. Brakes were drum front and rear, (disc front on later models) operated pedal-cycle style by two handlebar levers. The early models had some resemblance to Honda's C50/70/90 Super Cub range with a similar shape, dual seat and rear carrier, but with a scooter type floor, unlike the P series of mopeds such as the Honda PC50 or the Honda Express N series, which had cycle style construction. The SH50 was also known as the City Express and in some markets, as the Scoopy. All models had cycle type wheels as against the smaller wheels of later 50cc scooter style mopeds. The battery, fuel tank and two-stroke-oil reservoir were contained under the seat. Electrics were 12 volt and a handlebar mounted binnacle, which effectively formed part of the front bodywork, contained basic instrumentation and warning lights.

== Early models (1984–1996) ==
=== SH50–E ===
The first version of the SH50 carried an "E" suffix, and was imported into the UK from March 1984 to September 1986. It was made in Honda Benelux's plant at Aalst, Belgium and was available in either red or white with the floor panels painted in the same colour. This model differed from the later "H" and "K" designations in that the length, width and height were 1.800 m (70.9 in), .694 m (27.3 in) and 1.05 m (41 in), respectively. It was also slightly lighter at 68 kg (150 lb)

=== SH50–H ===
The "H" suffixed version replaced the "E" model from 1986. There were minor changes to the dimensions as it was slightly longer, narrower and lower. The drive train, power output and other mechanicals, remained the same as the earlier model. It was available in blue or red, with slightly different graphics and the floor panels were now painted grey. This model was manufactured at Honda's factory at Barcelona, Spain.

=== SH50–K/P/D/DP ===
The "K" suffixed model went into production in 1989. Apart from different graphics it was identical to the "H" type that it replaced. It was later superseded by "P", "D" and "DP" models which had only minor cosmetic changes and cast three-spoke wheels.

Sources

- Where not already noted, infobox specifications obtained from:- Churchill, Jeremy. Honda SH50 City Express: Owners Workshop Manual. Haynes. ISBN 1850105979.

== Later model (1996–2003) ==
Honda SH50 (post 1996 model)
- Manufacturer: Honda Motor Company
- Production: 1996–2003
- Assembly: Italy, Japan, Spain
- Power: 3.4 hp (3 kW; 3 PS)
- Torque: 3.2 lb–f
- Ignition type: Capacitor discharge electronic ignition.
- Suspension: Telescopic coil sprung, front; Swingarm with twin shock absorber, rear
- Brakes: Single disc front, drum rear
- Tyres: Front 250–16 tubed. Rear 275–16 tubed.
- Wheelbase: 1.267 m (49.9 in)
- Dimensions: L: 1.867 m (73.5 in); W: .694 m (27.3 in); H: 1.091 m (43.0 in)
- Seat height: .763 m (30.0 in)
- Weight: 83.8 kg (185 lb) (dry)
- Fuel capacity: 6.30 L (1.39 imp gal; 1.66 US gal)

In 1996, the SH50 underwent a number of revisions. The bodywork was restyled to give a less angular look, incorporating a raised pillion seat. The front brake became disc operated, the wheels were now of a cast asymmetrical type instead of spokes and there was under-seat storage as well as a lockable compartment on the inside of the front fairing. This version was manufactured in Spain, Italy and Japan and was approximately the same size as the earlier ones, but was slightly heavier and had a larger fuel tank.

Notes (later model)

- Only specifications which were different to the earlier models are detailed in the infobox.
- Where not already noted, infobox specifications obtained from:- Mather, Phil (2004). Twist and Go (automatic transmission) Scooters 50 to 250 cc: Service and Repair Manual. Haynes. ISBN 1844250822.
