= Johnson Motor Wheel =

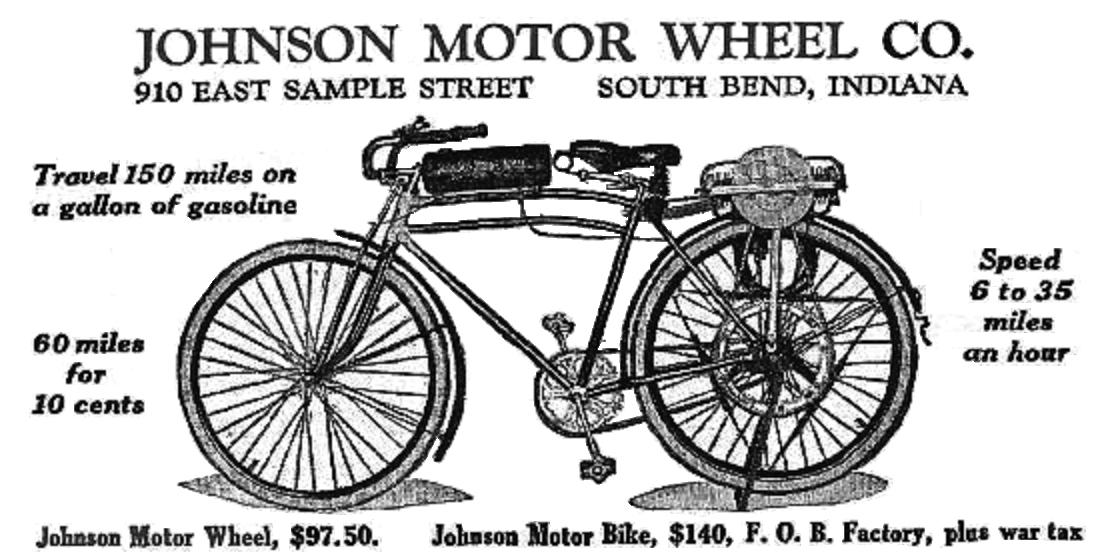
Excerpt from advertisement for the Johnson Motor Wheel, as seen on Page 52 of the April 1920 issue of Boys' Life

Johnson Motor Wheel was a kit to convert a bicycle into a motorized bicycle. It was manufactured by an American firm, Johnson Brothers Motor Company in Terre Haute, Indiana.

== History ==
The Johnson Motor Wheel was designed in 1914 by Louis Johnson. It was patented in the US in 1919 and in the UK in 1920. The initial design had problems at high speeds, so a fellow inventor from Indiana, Dick Oglesby, offered his ignition magnetos to the Johnsons in order to address the problem. The Johnson brothers moved to South Bend, Indiana, and formed the Johnson Brothers Motor Wheel Company to manufacture the kits.

The Motor Wheel had a 2 cycle engine which produced 1HP and had two flywheel magnetos, bronze bearings and a float feed carburetor. The complete kit came with a wheel, hub tire, shock-absorbing spring sprocket holder, wheel sprocket and chain, handlebar controls for choke, throttle and engine shutoff, three quart gas tank and gas line, and all necessary fittings to adapt the engine and rear wheel unit to any 26" bicycle.

== See also ==
- Timeline of motorized bicycle history
- List of motorcycles of the 1910s
- List of motorcycle manufacturers
- Motorized bicycle
