= Narazo Shimazu =

Japanese motorcycle builder (1888–1973)

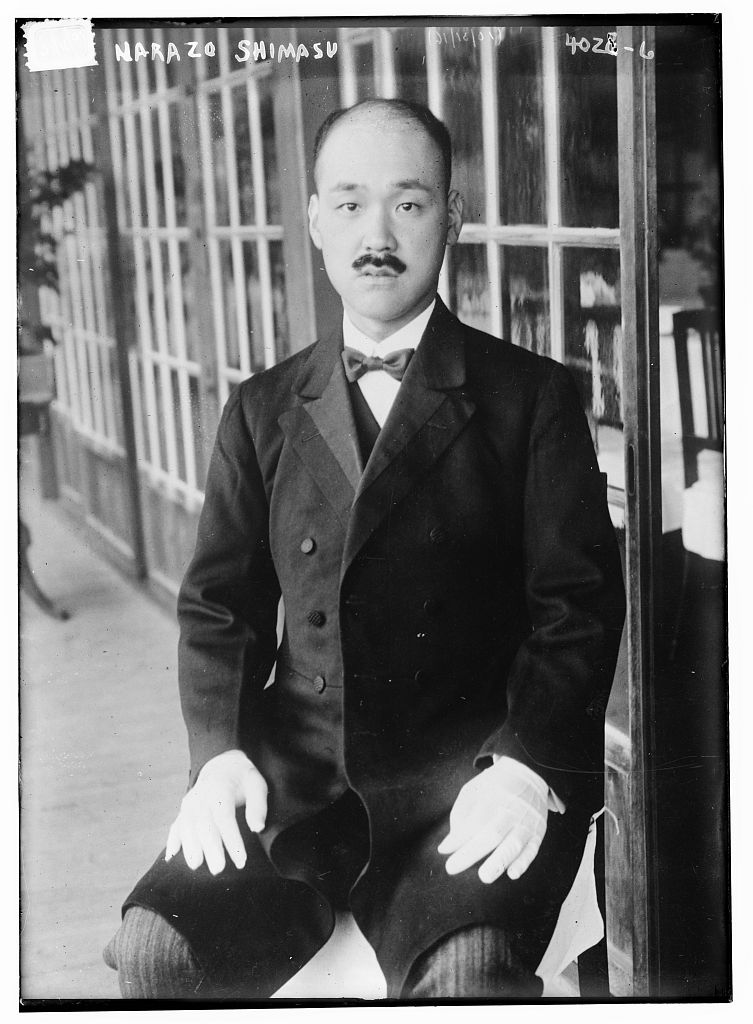
Narazo Shimasu circa 1915

Narazo Shimazu (1888–1973) founded Shimazu Motor Research Institute, that built the NS Motorcycle.

== Biography ==
Shimazu was born in Japan in 1888. In 1903, his father bought him a bicycle. In the same year he encountered a motorcycle. He went to Tokyo for races of foreign motorcycles. In 1908, at the age of 20, he established the Shimazu Motor Research Institute, where he designed and built the first two-stroke engine in Japan.
