= George A. Wyman =

American cyclist

George A. Wyman as he arrived in New York

George Adams Wyman (July 3, 1877 – November 15, 1959) was the first person to make a transcontinental crossing of the United States by motor vehicle. In 1903, Wyman rode his 1902 California Motor Company motor bicycle from San Francisco to New York City in 51 days, finishing 20 days before Dr. Horatio Nelson Jackson, the first person to cross the continent by automobile.

== Early years ==
Wyman was born on July 3, 1877, in Oakland, California. As a teen, he became interested in bicycle racing, which reached its zenith during the 1890s. He became a leading bicycle racer and, at the turn of the century, moved to Australia to pursue his racing career. Following Australians Arthur Richardson, Alex White, and Donald Mackay, Wyman became the first American to circumnavigate the continent of Australia on a bicycle. In 1902, he returned to California as a top-ranked cyclist, and raced for various Bay Area bicycling clubs. It was during this time that he also began to ride motorized bicycles.

In the summer of 1902, perhaps inspired by the epic 1884 bicycle expedition of Thomas Stevens, Wyman became the first person to cross the Sierra Nevada aboard a motor vehicle, riding his 1.5-hp California motorbike from San Francisco to Reno, Nevada, to compete in a club bicycle race at the Reno Fairgrounds. During the trip, Wyman conceived the idea of riding a motorbike across the United States.

== Transcontinental crossing ==
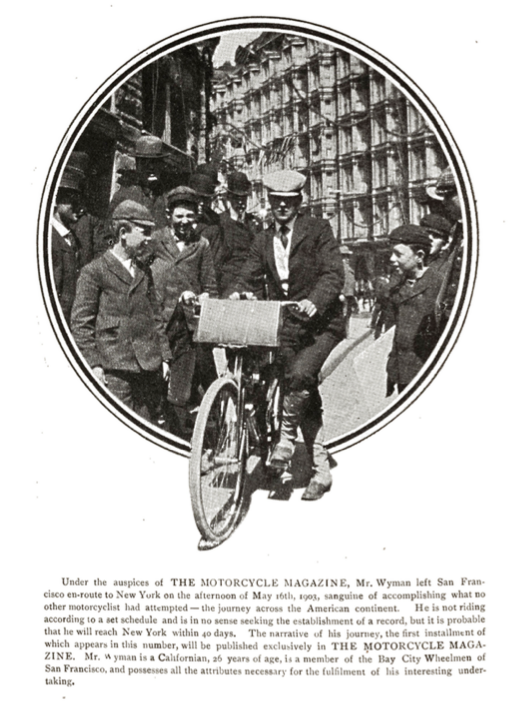
Wyman as he left San Francisco for his transcontinental crossing

Wyman used his 1902 California machine for his crossing of the United States. The California had a 200 cc (12 cu in), 1.5 hp (1.1 kW) four-stroke engine attached to an ordinary diamond-frame bicycle. Wyman's machine was equipped with 28 x 1.5 in. tires, wooden rims, a leading-link front suspension fork, a Garford spring saddle, a Duck Brake Company front roller brake, and a 1902-patent Atherton rear coaster brake. A leather belt-drive with a spring-loaded idler pulley directly connected the engine output shaft to the rear wheel. Using a standard steel bicycle frame, the California weighed approximately 70–80 pounds (32–36 kg) without rider, and was capable of approximately 25 mph (40 km/h) using the 30-octane gasoline of the day, with a range of 75 to 100 miles (121 to 161 km). Throttle control was not yet perfected, and engine revolutions were mainly controlled by means of a spark timing mechanism. The wick-type carburetor was crude, consisting of a metal box with internal baffles stuffed with cotton batting. With no float chamber, the rider had to open the gasoline tap periodically to admit fuel into the carburetor.

For such a long trip, Wyman carried a small amount of gear. A set of warm clothing, money, water bottle, cans for spare oil and gasoline, a Vest Pocket Kodak camera, a cyclometer, various bicycle tools and spare parts, and a long-barreled .38 Smith & Wesson revolver constituted his total luggage.

Wyman departed from Lotta's Fountain at the corner of Market and Kearny streets in San Francisco at 2:30 P.M on May 16, 1903. He had previously agreed to keep a diary of his journey for later publication in The Motorcycle magazine, a periodical of the time. The first part of his trip took him across the Sierra Nevada, through the Nevada desert into Wyoming, then on through Nebraska to Illinois.

As the dirt trails and wagon tracks of the day were often impassable, Wyman rode the railroad tracks for over half of his journey. During the first part of his trip, he frequently slept in railroad company housing or at rooming houses located in division settlements (small municipalities founded by the railroad). His motorbike suffered several breakdowns along the way, requiring him to make improvised repairs until he could get to a larger town to obtain new parts. As he neared Aurora, Illinois, his engine's crankshaft snapped, and after pedaling his way to Chicago, Wyman was forced to wait there five days for a new crank to arrive by railway express.

After leaving Illinois, Wyman traversed the states of Indiana, Ohio, and Pennsylvania before entering New York state. Outside of Albany his engine lost all power, and he was required to pedal his heavy motorbike the remaining 150 miles (240 km) to New York City using a cycle path reserved for licensed cyclists.

On July 6, 1903, Wyman arrived in New York City, completing his transcontinental crossing and becoming the first person to cross the North American continent aboard a motor vehicle. His journey took a total of 51 days to cover some 3,800 miles (6,100 km). Afterwards, Wyman's motorbike was placed on display at the New York Motorcycle Club while Wyman recovered from his grueling journey. While in New York, Wyman was present for the inauguration of the very first nationwide motorcycle organization, the Federation of American Motorcyclists (FAM) at the Kings County Wheelmens' Club in Brooklyn; it was reported at the time that his hands were still in bandages from the trip. Wyman later returned to San Francisco by train. His California motorbike was put on display in San Francisco at Golden Gate Park for a special exhibition commemorating the trip.

== Later life ==
Following his successful crossing of the United States, Wyman settled in San Francisco. He endorsed the Duck Roller Brake in promotional advertisements and worked as a chauffeur before becoming an automobile mechanic. He eventually married and had two sons. Wyman later moved to Eureka, California, continuing to work as an auto mechanic. He died November 15, 1959, at age 82 in San Joaquin County, California. He was cremated and his remains rest with that of his wife Nellie G. Wyman in Mountain View Cemetery, Oakland, California, in the main mausoleum, Section 157, Niche 1, Tier 2.
