= NS Motorcycle =

NS Motorcycle by Narazo Shimazu
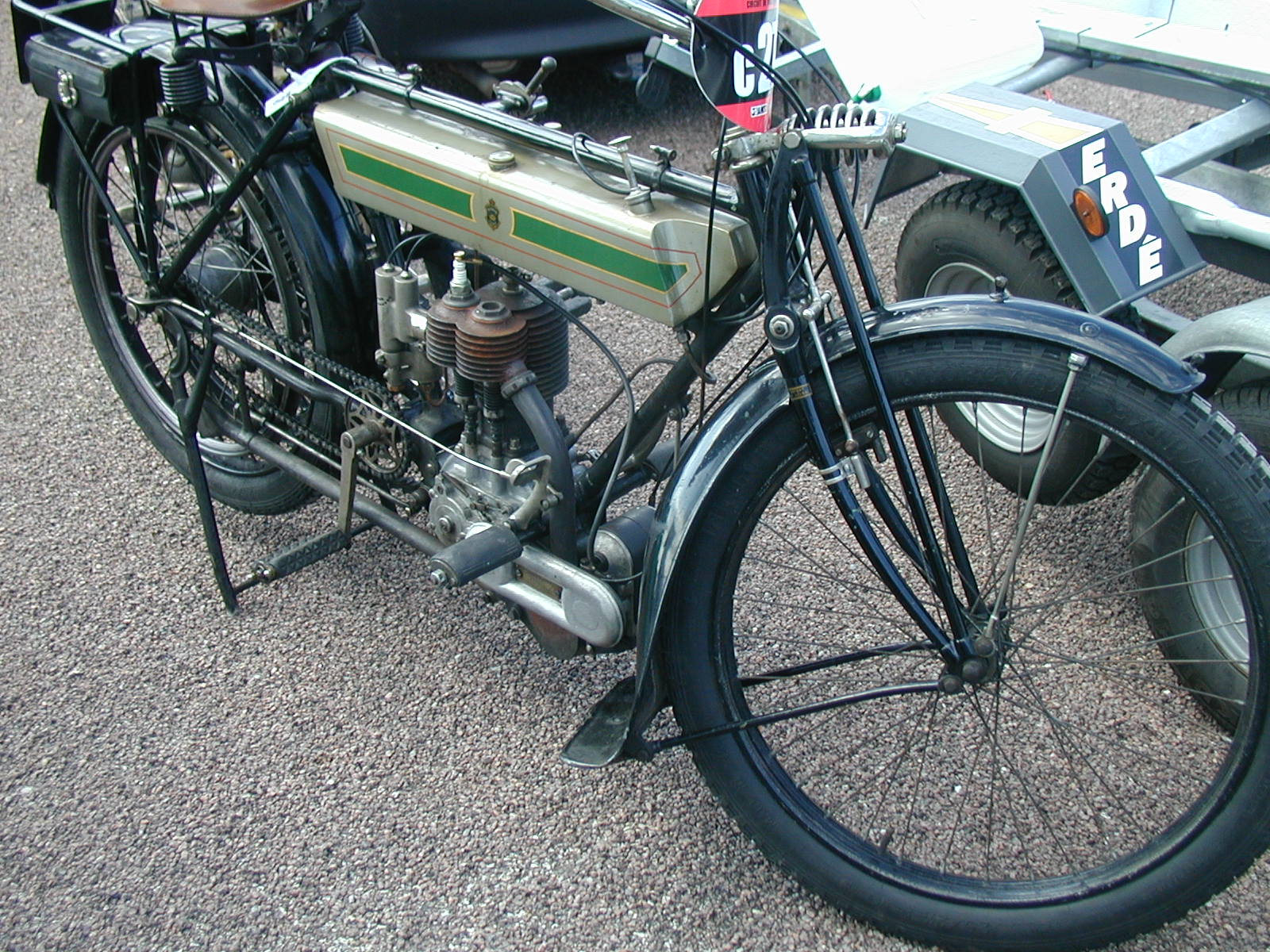
- An Early Triumph Motorcycle which provided the type of frame used by Narazo Shimazu to build the first Japanese motorcycle
- Manufacturer: NMC
- Parent company: Narazo Shimazu, Tankin
- Production: 1909, Approximately 20 units
- Successor: Arrow First
- Class: Standard
- Engine: air-cooled, 1-cylinder, 4-stroke
- Frame type: Triumph(UK)
- Suspension: Spring Front, None Rear

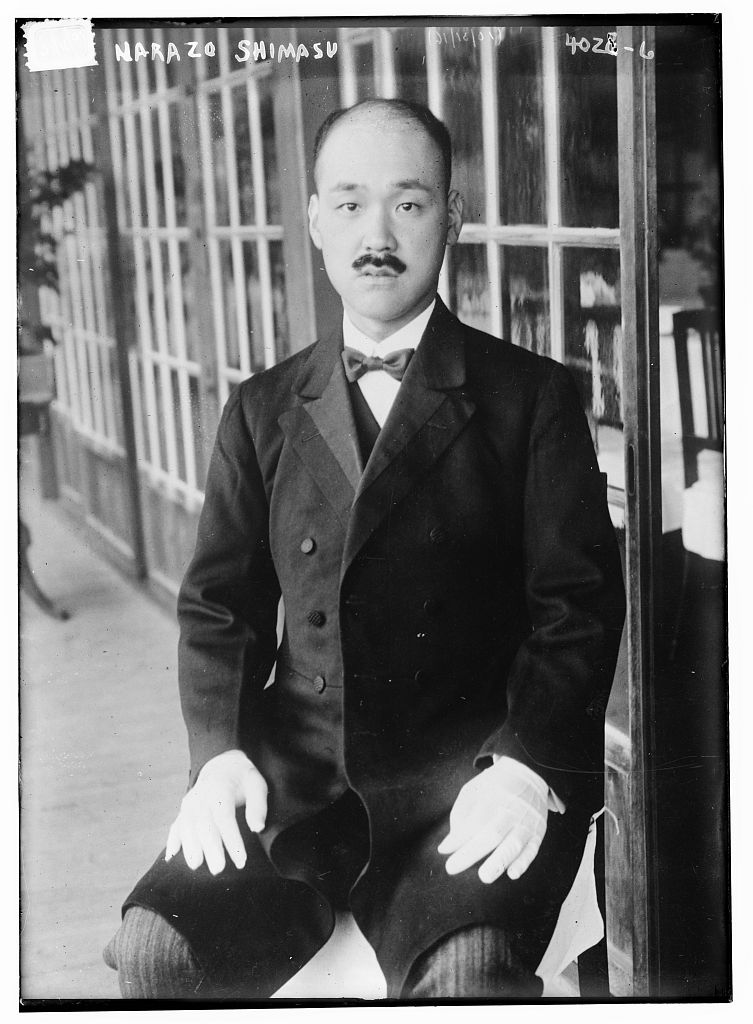
Narazo Shimasu circa 1915

The NS motorcycle, made by Narazo Shimazu in 1909, was the first motorcycle to be designed, built and sold in Japan. Shimazu created the Nihon Motorcycle Company (NMC) to manufacture the NS. In 1926 he then produced another new motorcycle design, the Arrow First. The earliest motorcycle that the Society of Automotive Engineers of Japan (in Japanese) includes on its list of the 240 Landmarks of Japanese Automotive Technology is the 1909 NS.

== Nihon Motorcycle Company ==
In 1908 Narazo Shimazu created his first two-stroke engine, a 40 cc single-cylinder, and used it to propel a bicycle. In 1909 he produced his first four-stroke engine as well as a motorcycle frame to go with it. This is generally thought to be the first motorcycle made in Japan. Shimazu produced more than 20 of his NS motorcycles at Nihon Motorcycle Company (NMC) and later produced more than 700 Arrow First motorcycles at Japan Motors Manufacturing.

== Influences ==
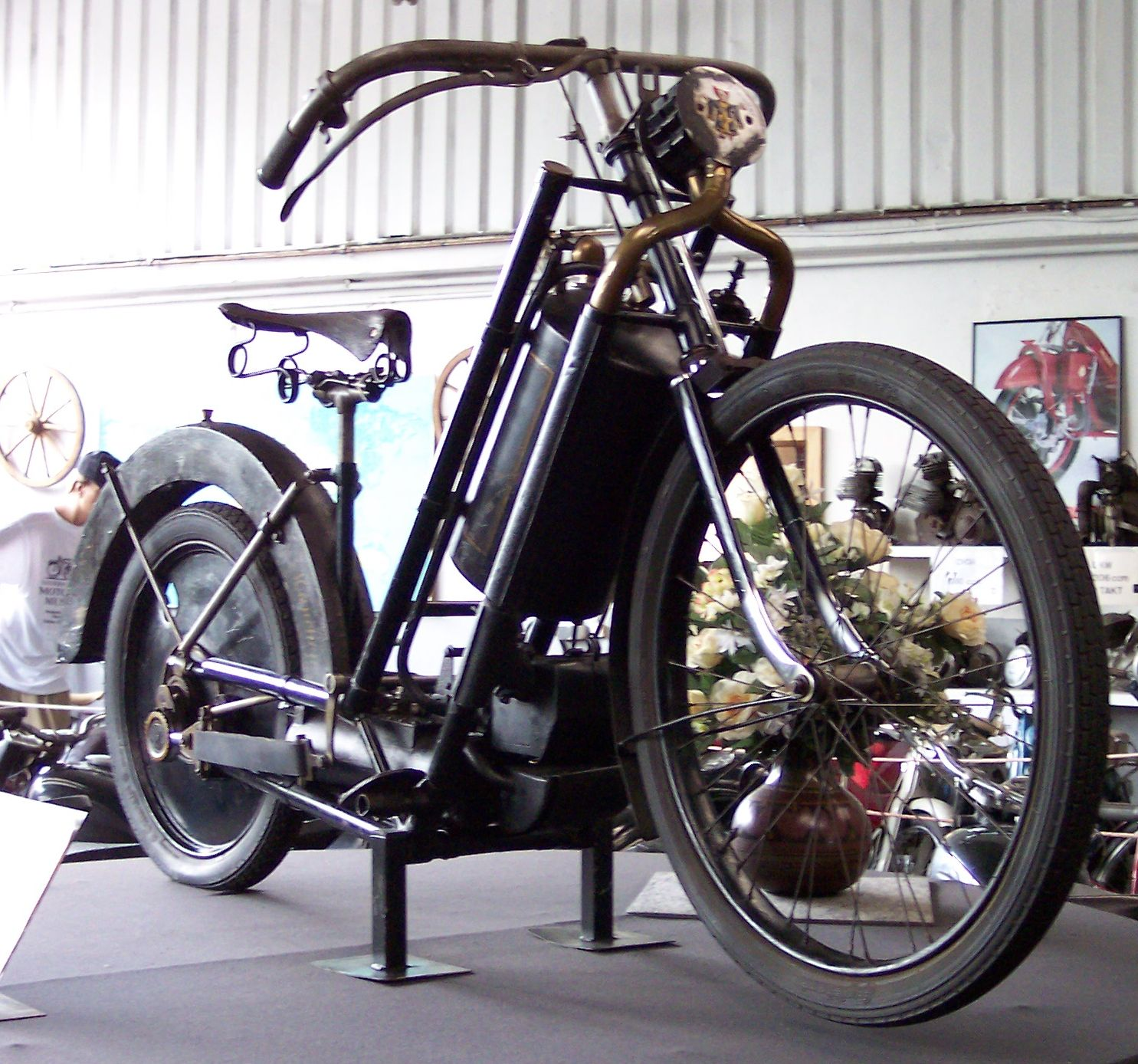
The 1894 Hildebrand & Wolfmüller Motorrad

On January 19, 1896, the Hildebrand & Wolfmüller Motorrad (from Germany) was put on display with a trial run in Tokyo and was given the name of Petroleum Bicycle (very similar to the name of the Petroleum Reitwagen which was developed by Gottlieb Daimler and Wilhelm Maybach in Germany in 1885, which was well known in Japan at this time). The H&W Motorrad had been imported by Jumonji Nobosuke co-owner of the Jumonji Trading Company.

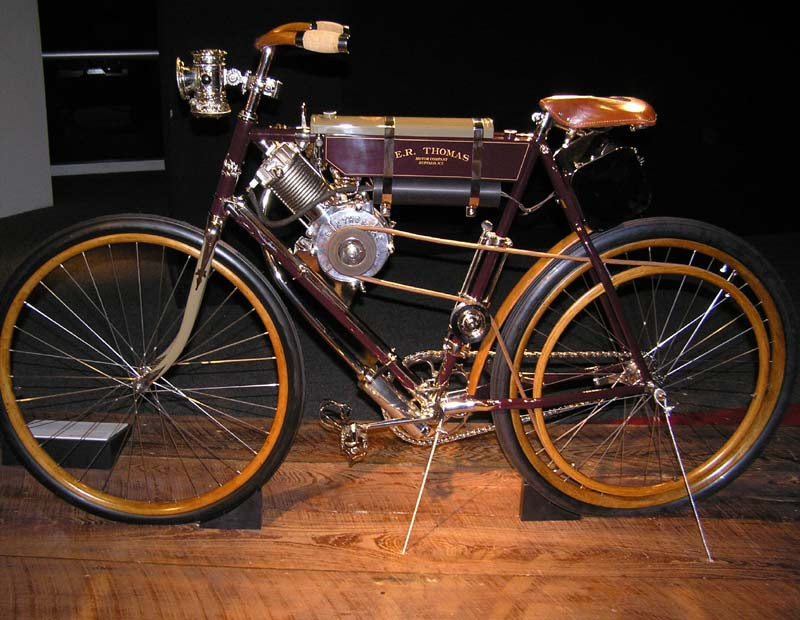
A 1900 Thomas Auto-Bi (USA)

By 1901, the first American-made motorcycles began to appear, one of which was the Thomas Auto-Bi. It used a De Dion-Bouton 200 cc capacity engine developing 2.25 hp. In April 1902, the California motorcycle from the USA was advertised but may not have arrived yet. Also possible by then was the arrival of the US made Orient-Aster motorcycle.

Two Mitchells, which were very similar to the E.R. Thomas Auto-Bi, were imported in 1903. These motorcycle had De Dion-Bouton's air-cooled four-cycle engines of 347 cc. The frame was 23 inches and the machine weighed 55 kg (121 lb). Top speed was listed as 55 km/h (34 mph). The Mitchell-Lewis Motor Company had been founded in 1900.

== History ==
In 1903, his father bought Narazo Shimazu a bicycle. That same year he was fascinated by the news of the motorcycle. He went to Tokyo for races that had featured foreign owned Thomas (USA) and Gladiator (French) made motorcycles.

In 1908 at the age of 20 Shimazu established the Shimazu Motor Research Institute. In 1908 Shimazu created a two-cycle motorcycle engine of 400 cc capacity and by December he had fit this engine into a bicycle frame he had purchased for that purpose. In 1909 he completed the construction of a four-cycle engine of his own design, and built a frame by reusing material from old bicycles. This was the first motorcycle manufactured in Japan, and Shimazu built a total of twenty of these, which he put his initials "NS" on. Customers were disappointed that the motorcycles he made often broke under their own weight while traveling on the primitive roads of that era.

In 1926 Shimazu completed a new motorcycle design called the Arrow First, and promoted it by taking four of the new motorcycles on a cross-country journey from Kagoshima to Tokyo. Later in the year Shimazu went into bankruptcy, but then helped found a new company, Japan Motors Manufacturing, in Osaka and worked to improve the Arrow First. The new company produced a motorcycle with an air-cooled four-cycle side valve design engine of 250 cc capacity and a two-speed transmission. Production reached 50 to 60 machines a month and eventually totaled over 700 machines in three years.

== See also ==
- List of motorcycles of 1900 to 1909
- List of motorcycles of the 1910s
- List of motorcycles of the 1920s
