= Hudspeth (surname) =

Hudspeth is a surname and may refer to:

- A. James Hudspeth (1945–2025), American neurophysiologist, F.M. Kirby Professor at Rockefeller University
- Adam Hudspeth (1836–1890), Canadian lawyer and politician
- Andrew H. Hudspeth (1874–1948), associate justice and chief justice of the New Mexico Supreme Court
- Brad Hudspeth (born 1989), American wheelchair rugby player
- Charles Hudspeth (activist) (1918–1999), civil rights leader from San Antonio, Texas
- Charles Hudspeth (convict), American man convicted of murder in Marion County, Arkansas in 1887
- Cindy Lee Hudspeth (1958–1978), American murder victim
- Claude B. Hudspeth (1877–1941), American rancher, lawyer, and statesman from El Paso, Texas
- Frank Hudspeth (1890–1963), English footballer, played for Newcastle United for 19 years, captain 1923–1926
- Harry Lee Hudspeth (born 1935), United States federal judge
- Mark Hudspeth (born 1968), current head football coach at the University of Louisiana at Lafayette
- Robert Hudspeth (1894–1935), American Negro League baseball player
- Tommy Hudspeth, football coach at both the collegiate and professional levels

== See also ==
- Hudspith
