= California Motor Company =

Roy C. Marks Moto Bicycle
- Manufacturer: Roy C. Marks
- Also called: California Moto Bicycle
- Production: 1896
- Assembly: San Francisco, California, USA
- Successor: California Moto Bicycle
- Class: Moto Bicycle
- Engine: 90 cc (5.5 cu in) Roy C. Marks Patent
- Power: 0.5 hp (0.37 kW)
- Tires: 1.5 in (38 mm) x 28 in (710 mm)
- Weight: 90 lb (41 kg) (dry)

The California Motor Company was founded in San Francisco to produce the motorcycle created by Roy C. Marks formerly of Toledo, Ohio. The 1896 Marks Motorcycle was the first motorcycle made in the United States.

== History ==
Roy C. Marks, formerly of Toledo, Ohio, created the first moto bicycle in the United States in 1896 in San Francisco. In 1901 the California Motor Company was created for the purpose of manufacturing the Marks design of motorcycle. Founder were Lewis Bill - President, J. W. Leavitt - Vice President, and J.F. Bill - Secretary and Treasurer.

Two patents were issued to Marks. On 30 September 1902, patent 710,329 Explosive Engine for Motor-Vehicles (which had been filed on September 7, 1901) was granted, and patent 710,330 Carbureter for Explosive-Engines (January 2, 1902).

=== First US-made motorcycle ===
The 1896 Marks which had an engine copied from the De Dion-Bouton design, was the first motorcycle manufactured in the USA.

=== First transcontinental road trip ===
In May 1903 George Wyman left San Francisco on a California Moto Bicycle bound for New York City. After 50 days, hands in bandages after having pedaled the last 150 miles Wyman arrived in New York City.

=== Sale to Consolidated Mfg. ===
The fame associated with this event resulted in the California Motor Company being purchased by Consolidated Manufacturing. Its machinery was disassembled and moved to Toledo, Ohio. It was there that Consolidated manufactured the Yale Motorcycle.

=== Japan influence ===
The California was one of the first motorcycles to be imported into Japan Along with the Hildebrand & Wolfmüller, Thomas Auto-Bi and Mitchell it was influential in establishing the Japanese Motor Industry.

== See also ==
- NS Motorcycle - the California Motorcycle in Japan
- List of motorcycles of 1900 to 1909
