= Hudspith Steam Bicycle =

Steam-powered bicycle

The Hudspith Steam Bicycle is a fully functioning, steam-powered bicycle, designed and made by Geoff Hudspith.

It first ran in October 2000 and was first exhibited publicly at the 2001 Great Dorset Steam Fair. It has since been exhibited - and ridden - at other rallies, including those in Denmark France and Germany.

It is an ordinary pedal bicycle, based on a restored 1949 VéloSoleX frame, modified to carry and use a home-made steam engine, and has a range of around 10 miles (16 km) on one tank of water and a top speed of 20 miles per hour (32 km/h).

Hudspith has also built a steam-powered gramophone.
