= Tanaka Power Equipment =

Defunct combustion engine manufacturer

- Company type: Private

Tanaka Power Equipment was a company manufacturing small internal combustion engines and associated light machinery. During the 1960s and 1970s they built the popular Bike Bug bolt-on motor for bicycles, which was also adapted for marine use as well as being sold through Sears rebadged the Sears Free Spirit.

Tanaka is a fourth-generation, family-owned company, and is now primarily active in the market for two-stroke powered, handheld, outdoor power equipment, with a customer base including both domestic and trade users. Recently Tanaka has been backed financially by Hitachi Koki, but little else has changed.

In 2021, Koki holdings ceased production of all 2-stroke engine products, thus ending production of all Tanaka products.
