= Riquimbili =

Improvised motor-powered bicycles found in Cuba

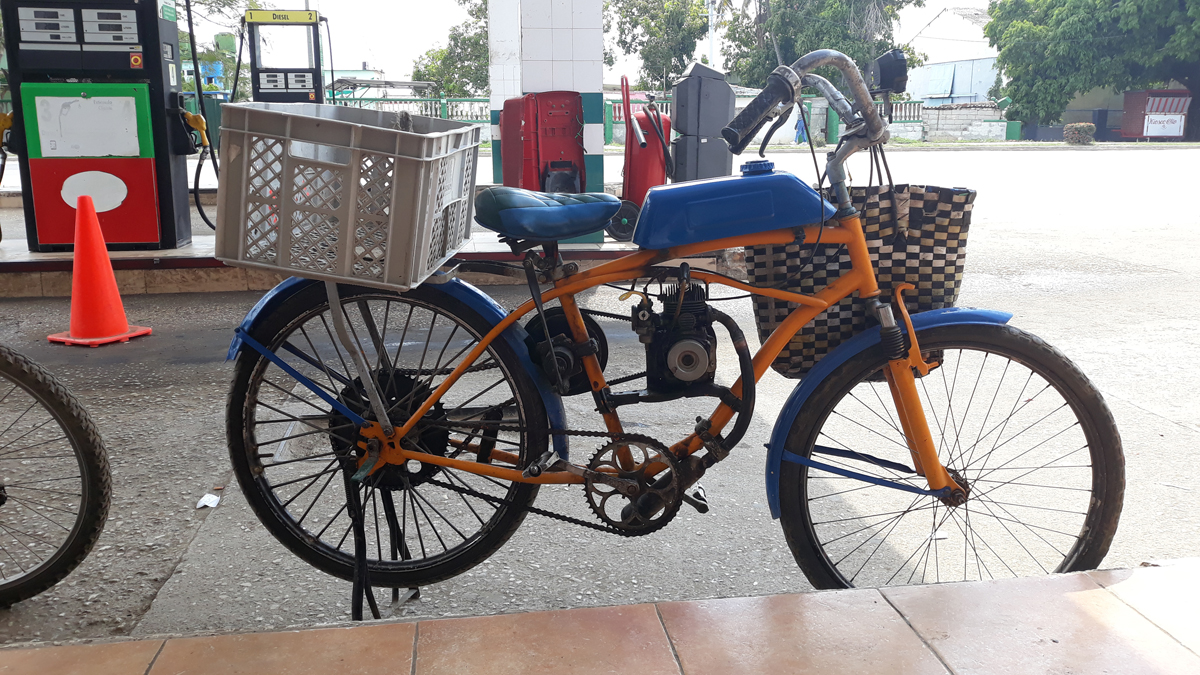
A riquimbili in 2021.

Riquimbili are improvised motorised bicycles found in Cuba, often using such things as a chainsaw motor and a plastic bottle to hold the gasoline. These improvised motorcycles are illegal but tolerated. Some riquimbili are modified for racing, which is less tolerated by authorities.
