= Motorized bicycle =

Bicycle with a motor or engine and transmission

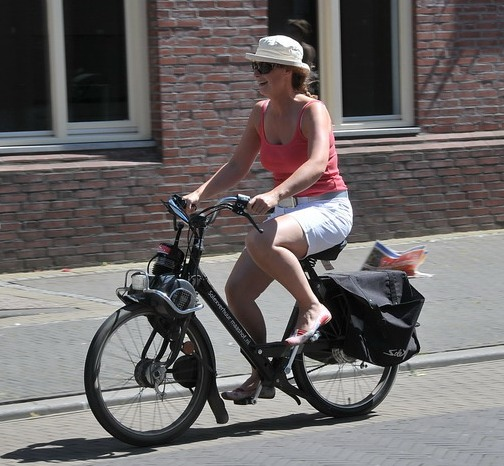
A VéloSoleX motorized bicycle

A motorized bicycle is a bicycle with a motor or engine and transmission used either to power the vehicle unassisted, or to assist with pedaling. Since it sometimes retains both pedals and a discrete connected drive for rider-powered propulsion, the motorized bicycle is in technical terms a true bicycle, albeit a power-assisted one. Typically they are incapable of speeds above 52 km/h (32 mph); however, in recent years larger motors have been built, allowing bikes to reach speeds of upwards of 113 km/h (70 mph).

Powered by a variety of engine types and designs, the motorized bicycle formed the prototype for what would later become the motor driven cycle.

== Terminology ==
The term motorized bicycle refers to just a bicycle combining pedal power and internal combustion engine power. However, the term could be used as an umbrella category to refer to bicycles using sources besides pedal power. Electric bicycles technically could be in the category of motorized bicycles but instead of using internal combustion engines as a combination it is driven by electric motors which power from pedals and batteries. Mopeds are also almost motorized bicycles since they function the same way as these vehicles but with engines less than 50 cc (3.1 cu in).

The term motorized bicycle should not be confused with motorcycle since this type of vehicle uses a combination of pedal power and engine power whereas motorcycles are purely either internal combustion engine or electric motor powered.

== Design and usage ==
Motorized bicycles have utilized all variety of engines, from internal-combustion (IC) two-stroke and four-stroke gasoline engines to electric, diesel, or even steam propulsion. Most motorized bicycles are based or derived from standard general-purpose bicycle frame designs and technologies, although exceptions abound. In addition, modifications to a standard bicycle frame to support motorization may be extensive.

The earliest motorized bicycles were ordinary utility bicycles fitted with an add-on motor and transmission to assist normal pedal propulsion, and it is this form that principally distinguishes the motorized bicycle from a moped or motorcycle. In a day when gasoline engine and transmission designs were in their infancy, and power-to-weight ratios were low, a dual-purpose propulsion system seemed particularly advantageous. As time went on, pedal propulsion was increasingly replaced by constant use of a two or four-stroke gasoline engine. Nevertheless, the concept of using motor assist for the ordinary bicycle has persisted, and the concept has periodically resurfaced over the years, particularly in times of austerity or fuel shortages. In countries where automobiles and/or fuels are prohibitively expensive, the motorized bicycle has enjoyed continued popularity as a primary mode of transportation.

The design of the motorized bicycle varies widely according to intended use. Some motorized bicycles are powerful enough to be self-propelled, without use of the pedals. A development of the motorized bicycle is the moped, which commonly has only a vestigial pedal drive fitted primarily to satisfy legal requirements, and suitable only for starting the engine or for emergency use. The alternate design philosophy to the moped is the so-called motor-assist or pedal-assist bicycle. These machines utilize the pedals as the dominant form of propulsion, with the motor used only to give extra assistance when needed for hills or long journeys.

== History ==
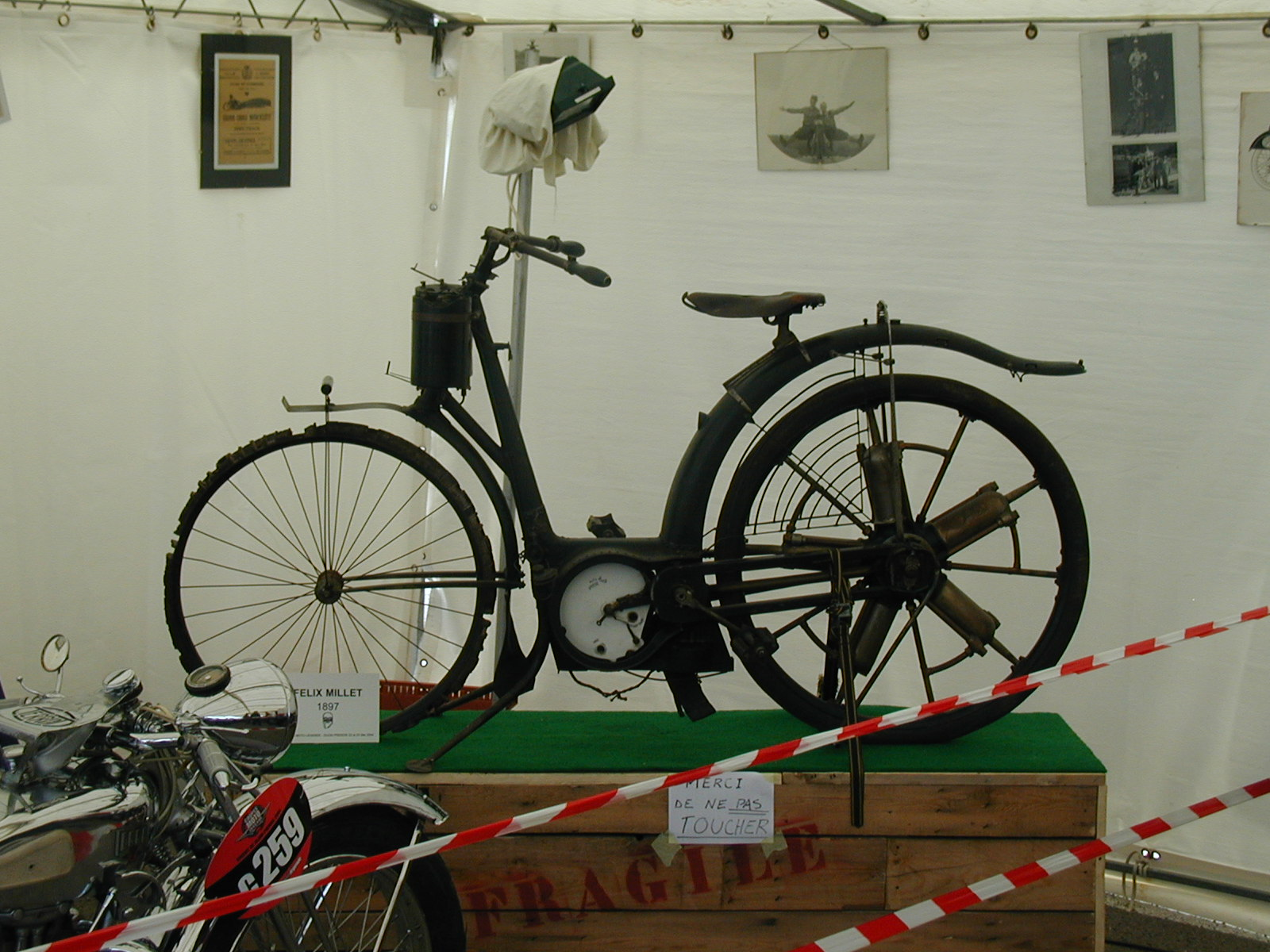
1897 Millet motorcycle, showing the common ancestry of motorized bicycles and motorcycles. Note the radial engine built into the back wheel.

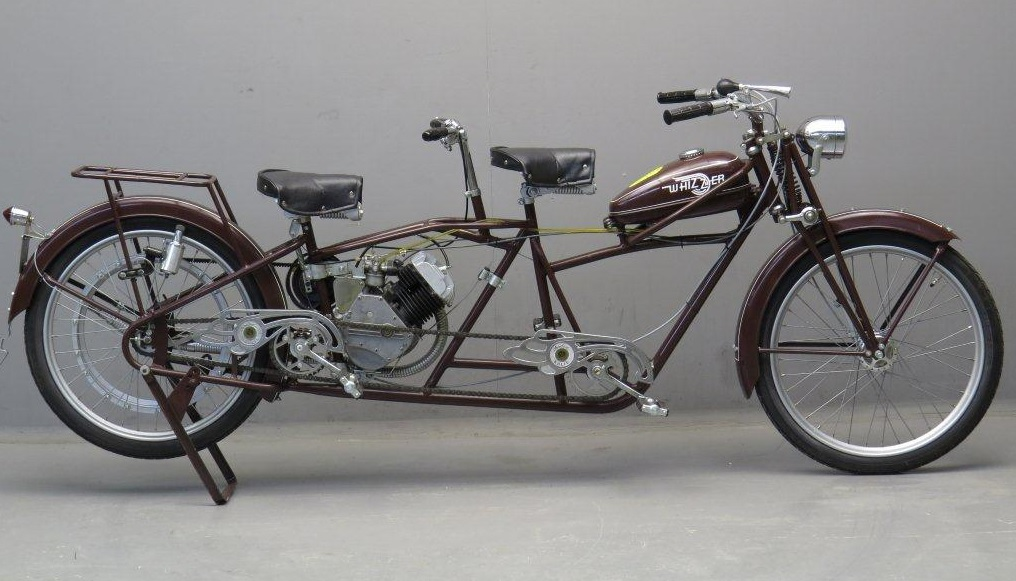
Whizzer 1949 tandem.

The two-wheeled pedal powered bicycle was first conceived in Paris in the 1860s. By 1888, John Dunlop's pneumatic tire and the chain drive made possible the safety bicycle, giving the bicycle its modern form.

The origins of the motorized bicycle or motorbike can be traced back to the latter part of the 19th century when experimenters began attaching steam engines to bicycles, tricycles, and quadracycles. The first true motorized bicycle is generally considered to be the French Michaux-Perreaux steam velocipede of 1868. The Michaux-Perreaux was followed by the American Roper steam velocipede of 1869, built by Sylvester H. Roper of Roxbury, Massachusetts. Roper demonstrated his machine at fairs and circuses in the eastern United States in 1867, and built a total of 10 examples. These early attempts at propelling a bicycle by means other than the human body were not successful, either practically or commercially. It was not until the 1890s, with the advent of the gasoline-powered internal combustion engine (ICE), that the motorized bicycle could be considered a practical machine.

One of the first gas motor-assisted bicycle designs was the Millet motorcycle developed by Félix Millet in France in 1892. Millet's designs had both pedals and a fixed-crankshaft radial engine built into the back wheel.

In 1896, E. R. Thomas of Buffalo, New York, began selling gasoline engine kits for propelling ordinary bicycles. After forming the Thomas Motor Company, he began selling complete motor-assisted bicycles under the name Auto-Bi. The Auto-Bi is generally considered to be the first production motorized bicycle made in the United States.

The 1900 Singer Motor Wheel was a wheel incorporating a small ICE powerplant that could be substituted for the front wheel of a bicycle. A later design, the 1914 Smith Motor Wheel, was attached to the rear of a bicycle by means of an outrigger arm, a design later taken up by Briggs & Stratton.

In Belgium, the Minerva company, later known for luxury cars, started out manufacturing standard safety bicycles in 1897, before expanding into light cars and "motocyclettes" from 1900. They produced lightweight clip-on engines that mounted below the front down tube, specifically for Minerva bicycles, but also available in kit form suitable for almost any bicycle. The engine drove a belt turning a large gear wheel attached to the opposite side of the rear wheel as the chain. By 1901 the kit engine was a 211 cc (12.9 cu in) unit developing 1.5 hp (1.1 kW; 1.5 PS), comfortably cruising at 30 km/h (19 mph) at 1,500 rpm, capable of a top speed of 50 km/h (31 mph), and achieving a fuel consumption in the range of 3 L/100 km (94 mpg_{‑imp}; 78 mpg_{‑US}). These kits were exported around the world to countries including the United Kingdom, France, Germany, the Netherlands, Australia, and other British territories of the time.

As engine power increased, frame ruptures became increasingly common, and by 1903 Minerva had developed an in-frame design with the engine mounted above the bottom bracket, while still also offering the clip-on kit. From 1904 Minerva began focusing more on car production, and while development and production of the Minerva motorized bicycles continued through to about 1909, they became a less and less significant part of the company.

In England, the Phelon & Rayner motorized bicycle was introduced in 1901, and was sold through 1903. The original Phelon & Rayner machine used a 260 cc (16 cu in), 1.75 horsepower (1.30 kW; 1.77 PS) gasoline engine mounted to a standard 28-inch bicycle frame.

In the United States, the California Motor Company was formed in 1901 to sell complete gasoline-engine motorbikes in San Francisco, Oakland, and San Jose. The company began with a 200 cc single-cylinder, 1.5-horsepower, four-stroke engine designed by R.C. Marks. Mounted to a standard bicycle frame, the California could reach speeds of approximately 25 mph (40 km/h). The California weighed around 75-80 pounds, and featured a leading-link front fork, a leather spring saddle, a front Duck roller brake, and an Atherton rear coaster brake. A leathern belt-drive directly connected the engine output shaft to the rear wheel. During the summer of 1903, George A. Wyman rode a 200 cc (12 cu in), 1.5 hp (1.1 kW; 1.5 PS) California from San Francisco to New York City, becoming the first person to cross the North American continent aboard a motor vehicle.

As early as 1903, motorized bicycles were being fitted with larger and heavier loop frames designed to specifically accommodate larger displacement engines, which produced higher speeds. These new motorbike frame designs soon incorporated a new riding position that no longer centered the rider over the pedals, but instead moved the rider's feet forward, where they rested on pegs or platforms. The new riding position was designed to increase rider comfort and control when using the motor for propulsion, and soon owners began relying on the gasoline motor for all but emergency use. Front suspension and (on some machines) rear suspension increased control at high speeds. By 1915, some manufacturers were omitting pedal propulsion entirely, resulting in the introduction of the first true modern motorcycle.

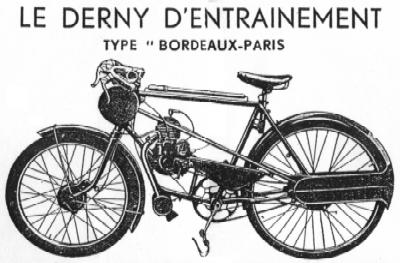
Derny motor-pacing cycle (motor mounted in frame, drive via chain to rear wheel)

At the same time, purpose-built motorbikes like the Derny and VéloSoleX, with stronger frames and sometimes with only token ability to be wholly human-powered were introduced in France. Many years later, manufacturers would re-introduce this concept as the moped, a small motorcycle fitted with pedals that can be used as a starting aid but which cannot, practically, be ridden under pedal power alone.

In France, the gasoline-powered motorized bicycle, known popularly as the vélomoteur or vélomoto was popular during the 1930s, and continued to be widely sold in early postwar years as a means of transportation during a period of gasoline shortages and limited automobile production.

In the 1930s, the United Kingdom and its former colonies also developed "clip-on" motors for bicycles (35 to 49 cc), followed by the "Autocycle" with a purpose-built frame incorporating pedals and a two-stroke engine (often a 98 cc Villiers engine), but without a gearbox (e.g. the Malvern Star). Autocycle manufacturers were well established in countries such as Britain and Australia before World War II.

In 1939, the American bolt-on Whizzer gas-engined bicycle kit was introduced, utilizing a 138 cc side-valve four-stroke engine, the first whizzer was of the friction drive variety, but was soon replaced with belt drive. Despite some initial engine reliability issues, the Whizzer enjoyed modest popularity during World War II due to fuel and automobile shortages, and was used by war plant workers and others with priority for transportation. After the war, the Whizzer became popular with youth who desired faster speeds from their heavy cruiser-framed Schwinn bicycles. In 1949, the company introduced a complete production bike, the Pacemaker. Sales of the Whizzer conversion kits continued until 1962. In the United Kingdom, the motorized bicycle saw a resurgence of popularity and such bolt-on motors as the Cyclaid and the Cyclemaster motor wheel saw brief periods of immense popularity. The Cyclemaster, which was a hub motor that could be fitted to an ordinary bike, started at 25 cc (painted black), but later the size went up to 32 cc (painted grey).

Elsewhere in Europe, the motorized bicycle continued to be popular, particularly in France and Italy. An Italian manufacturer, Vincenti Piatti, designed a 50 cc engine for driving portable lathes and this was also used to power a bicycle frame in the form of the Mini Motore. Piatti later licensed the design to Trojan for production in Britain as the Trojan Minimotor. In West Germany, a compression-ignition (diesel) engine kit using an 18 cc variable head engine made by Lohmann was produced during the 1950s. In France, where postwar reconstruction, taxes, and fuel shortages limited automobile access, motorized bicycle kits and complete models were produced by a variety of smaller manufacturers, often using a two-stroke gasoline engine mounted above the front wheel. In 1946, production of the very successful French VELOSOLEX commenced, continuing until 1988. The VéloSoleX was a mass-produced motorized bicycle that used a tire roller (friction drive) to the front wheel. After French production ceased, the VELOSOLEX continued to be produced in China and Hungary. An in-wheel gasoline engine was used on the Honda P50 moped, which ceased production in 1968. The velomoteur and motor scooter enjoyed a second renaissance in the 1960s and 1970s as a new generation of youth discovered they could ride a motorized vehicle without need of a driver's license. Other countries had relaxed licensing requirements, e.g. lower age limits for motorized bicycles, which increased their popularity.

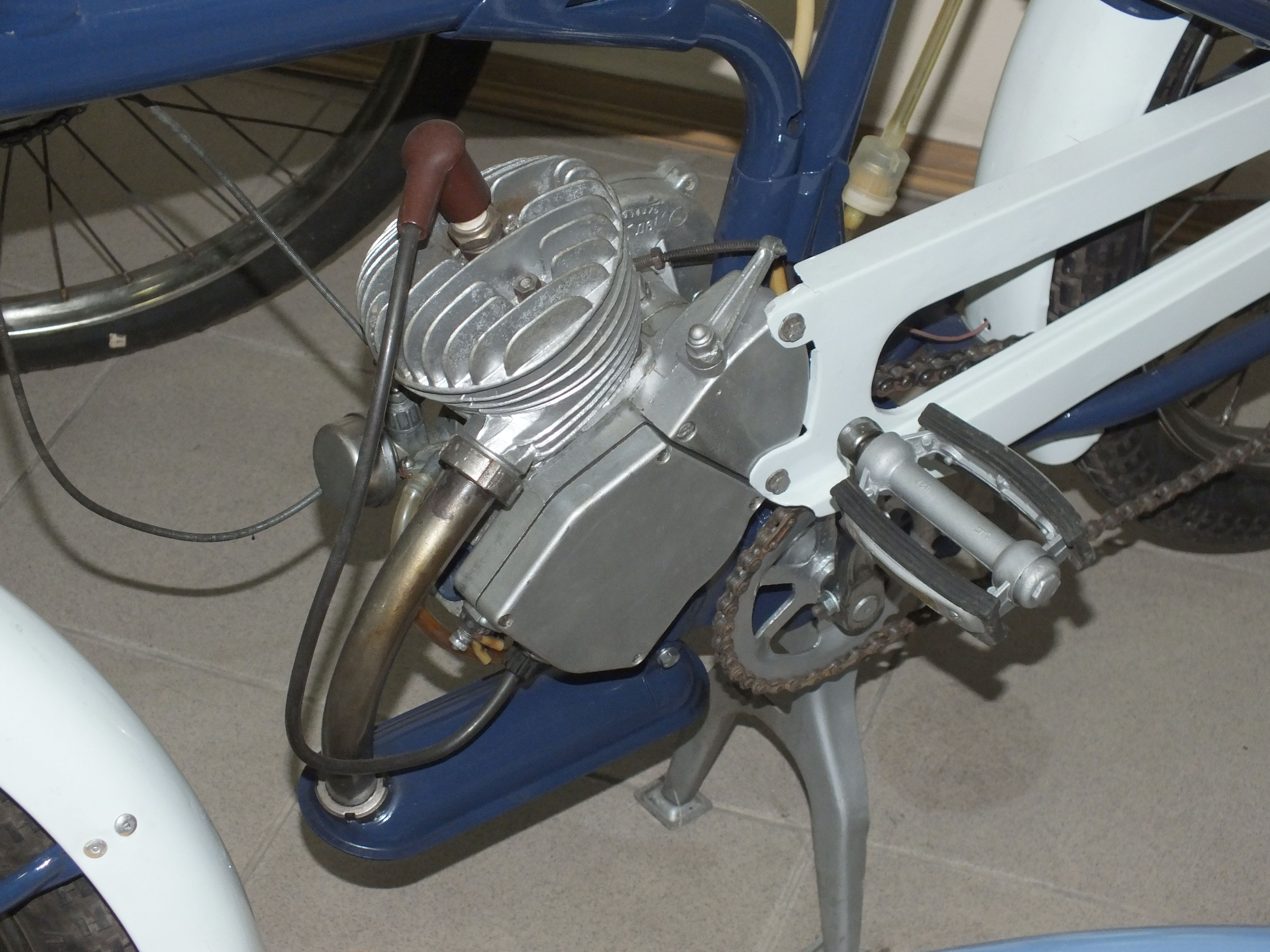
"Д-6" - Soviet kit engine of "D" series installed on 70s "Riga" commercial motor-bike

In the USSR, a deficiency of any vehicles in the market led to a great increase of cheap 50cc mopeds and kits production. Sales of the mopeds and kits reached approximately a half million per year in the later 70s. As to technical level, it was analogous to pre-WW2 German models, with minimal changes made to later 80s. The only clip-on kit engine was "D" series ("Д-4" ... "Д-8Э", designed by Soviet engineer Filip Priboloi), a single-speed chain-driven 45cc 2-stroke motor with manual clutch and a rotary slide valve in a crankshaft. It was destined for clipping into a classic twin-diamond bike frame. As of the present day, it is still widely produced by some Chinese factories like Jiangdu in a piston distribution version, and has some popularity even in the United States.

During the 1960s, the moped craze arrived in the United States, the United Kingdom, and other countries. Mopeds had been produced for years in France and Italy, but were largely unknown in other countries. The moped's surge in popularity was motivated by the arrival of new machines produced in Japan by Honda, Yamaha, and other manufacturers, which could be operated without a driver's license and with a minimum of effort to meet existing regulation by the authorities. The new moped designs were really low-powered motorcycles, equipped with pedals largely to meet legal requirements. Most could be pedaled only with difficulty over short distances on level ground.

== Current trends ==
Today, motorized bicycles are still being developed both as complete designs and as add-on motor kits for use on standard bicycles, either by part-time hobbyists or by commercial manufacturers. With the development of new, lighter, and more powerful batteries, electric motors for power assist are increasingly popular, often using hub motors to facilitate after-market conversions. Converting bicycles or tricycles has proven useful for some people with physical disabilities such as knee injury or arthritis.

In 2003 production of the French gasoline-powered VELOSOLEX ceased in Hungary. However, production continues in China and has restarted in France. In the United States, Velosolex America markets the VELOSOLEX worldwide.

Currently there are several companies manufacturing aftermarket internal combustion engine (ICE) motor conversion kits for conventional bicycles. These include both four-stroke and two-stroke gasoline engine designs. Among these, Golden Eagle Bike Engines currently produces a rear-engine (rack-mounted) kit using a belt to drive the rear wheel. Staton-Inc., a motorized bicycle manufacturer of long standing, also uses a rack-mount with either a tire roller-mount (friction drive) or a chain-driven, geared transmission. Other manufacturers produce kits using small two- or four-stroke gas engines mounted in the central portion of the bicycle frame, and incorporating various types of belt- or chain-driven transmissions and final drives. Some of these brands include Jiangdu Flying Horse Gasoline Engine Factory Ltd., EZ Motorbike Company, Inc., Mega Motors Inc., and Grubee Inc.

The Sachs 301/A (Germany) was a popular 30cc 2-stroke developed in the late 70's that was later copied by Pro-Rotary (Taiwan) in the late 90's as an RH-01 and sold in markets such as Australia. The design is that of a hub motor with considerable internal gear reduction resulting in low-output RPM hence low measured power. These units were fitted with a unique ignition system whereby the spark-advance curve limited output power to suite the relevant market, usually 500 W for Europe (Sachs 301/A) and 200 W for Australia (Rotary RH-01). These units could rarely exceed 20 km/h on level ground without pedal assistance hence are true 'power assisted' bicycles.

Motorized bicycles using electric motors have also re-entered the market. Electrically powered bicycles use batteries, which have a limited capacity and thus a limited range, particularly when large amounts of power are utilized. This design limitation means that the use of the electric motor as an assist to pedal propulsion is more emphasized than is the case with an internal combustion engine. While costly, new types of lithium batteries along with electronic controls now offer users increased power and range while reducing overall weight. Newer electric motor bicycle designs are gaining increasing acceptance, particularly in countries where increasing traffic congestion, aging populations, and concern for the environment have stimulated development and usage.

== Legal status of internal combustion engine (ICE) powered bicycles ==
The legal definition and status of motorized bicycles using internal combustion engines varies from nation to nation, and in some cases, on local rules and regulations.

=== Australia ===
Current laws in some states/territories allow the use of ICE motorized bicycles, provided they do not produce more than a certain number of watts of power. In Tasmania and The Northern Territory this limit is 200 watts. Queensland, New South Wales and South Australia have banned the use of ICE motorized bicycles. For example "In NSW, all petrol-powered bicycles are banned on New South Wales roads and road-related areas such as footpaths, shared paths, cycle ways and cycle paths. The ban, introduced on 1 October 2014, includes bicycles that:

-Have had a petrol-powered engine attached after purchase

-Were bought with an attached petrol-powered engine

-Are powered by any type of internal combustion engine."

And "As from the 15 December 2016 internal combustion engines that are fitted to bicycles are not permitted to be used on South Australian roads or road-related areas".

In Victoria ICE bicycles over 200 watts are classed as motorcycles and must be registered as such.

The legislation in all states favors electric power assisted bicycles over ICE powered bicycles.

=== Canada ===
In Canada, each province has its own authority over motor vehicle and transportation laws, including classification of vehicles used on public roads. Motorized bicycles using an internal combustion engine under 100 cc are generally legally indistinguishable from a bicycle on public roads.

An example of Nova Scotia's Motor Vehicle act, as it applies to Motorized Bicycles:

- 2 In this Act,
  - (c) "bicycle" means
    - (i) a vehicle propelled by human power upon which or in which a person may ride and that has two tandem wheels either of which is 350 millimetres or more in diameter or that has four wheels any two of which are 350 millimetres or more in diameter but does not include a wheelchair, or
    - (ii) a vehicle propelled by human and mechanical power that is fitted with pedals that are operable at all times to propel the bicycle, that has the same wheel requirements as set out in subclause (i) and that has an attached motor driven by electricity not producing more than 500 watts or with a piston displacement of not more than 50 cubic centimetres and is incapable of providing further assistance when the vehicle attains a speed of thirty kilometres per hour on level ground;

=== France ===
In France, the laws regulating moped and scooter (cyclomoteur) operation apply as well to the gas-powered motorized bicycle, variously known as a bicyclette motorisée, vélo motorisé, vélomoteur, or vélomoto. Under French law, no person under 14 years of age may operate a gas-powered motorized bicycle (defined as a bicycle with a gasoline motor under 50 cc displacement, and capable of a maximum speed of 45 kilometers per hour (28 mph)). All vélomotos or motorbikes must be registered, and all riders without a full driving license must pass a test and receive a certificate (Brevet de Sécurité Routière, or BSR) consisting of written exam and five hours of practical training, four and a half of which must be on public roads, with a driving school. All operators must carry third-party insurance and wear helmets, and a metal license tab with the owner's name (Plaque de nom) must be attached to the handlebars. Motorized bicycles are not permitted on French motorways, and riders must use cycle paths where provided.

=== Japan ===
In Japan, any vehicle with an internal combustion engine is regarded as a car, motorcycle or motorized bicycle. A motorized bicycle with a gasoline motor under 50 cc has a regulated maximum speed of 30 km/h (18.6 mph). It must be registered and the rider must have insurance. To ride one, you have to be at least 16 years old, have a license and wear a helmet. All riders without a full driving license for cars or motorcycles must pass a written test and go through one-day practical training in a driving school. Any two-wheel cycle with a gasoline motor over 50 cc is regarded as a motorcycle in law. It can be ridden by persons age 18 or over who have a full driving license for motorcycles who have had long-term training and have sat a driving exam in a driving school. A two-wheel cycle with a gasoline motor of under 125 cc is not permitted to go on Japan's controlled-access highways.

Motorized bicycles in Japanese law are treated as a 'miniature version of a motorcycle' in many cases, but a motorized bicycle should hook turn to the right in some cases on a signalized intersection with more than three lanes including a L/R turn lane in the same direction. A vehicle that has a maximum speed of over 20 km/h (12.4 mph) also requires, as a miniature version of a motorcycle, to have similar performance in terms of its brakes, tires, silencer, headlight, license plate lamp, rear reflector, side mirror, horn, tail lamp, brake lamp, direction indicators and speedometer. Hence, a regular bicycle to which an engine or motor has been simply added is illegal.

Driving without a suitable license or without insurance is strictly punishable by law. Any other violations including parking violations in urban areas are severely enforced.

=== Russia ===
Under Russian law, no person under 16 years of age may operate a gas-powered motorized bicycle (defined as a moped with a gasoline motor under 50 сс) displacement, and capable of a maximum speed of 50 kilometers per hour (31 mph)). Moped driver must use a helmet and he must keep right border. Velomotors are not under register. Since 2014, moped driver must have an "M category" license or any of higher grade. But as of 2015, there's no official procedure to obtain "M" license, so moped drivers are still not under control in practice.

=== United Kingdom ===
In United Kingdom, driving a motorized bicycle with a gasoline motor under 50cc, and max design speed of 30 mph is allowed for persons over 14 years old, NOT requiring a DVLA issued driving license. All bigger bikes have a minimum age of 17.

Purchasers of new-construction ICE motorized bicycles must meet a host of regulatory requirements and pass inspections from the DVLA and MSVA in order to register such machines for operation on public roadways. Owners must obtain an EC-type Motorcycle Single Vehicle Type Approval Certification (MSVA), and in order to obtain a DVLA-required insurance certificate, must provide proof from the original seller of the bicycle and engine that both the bicycle and the engine are new and unused. ICE motorized bicycles that are amateur-built and meet MSVA safety and regulatory standards, and which meet the definition of low powered mopeds (engines of proven output of less than 1 kW (1.34 hp) and capable of 25 km/h (16 mph) or less) face considerably fewer regulatory requirements.

=== United States ===
==== Federal law ====
In the United States, federal law governing ICE motorized bicycles is subject to interpretative rulings by the National Highway Traffic Safety Administration (NHTSA) at the United States Department of Transportation. Under current NHTSA rules, a "motor-driven cycle" (a definition that includes a two-wheel vehicle such as a bicycle with an add-on ICE engine of five brake horsepower or less, a speed capability of more than 20 miles per hour and/or lacks both a Vehicle Identification Number (VIN) and standard on-road safety equipment such as mirrors, turn signal lamps, side marker lamps, and stop lamps), then the vehicle shall not be considered a "motor vehicle" as defined by DOT/NHTSA regulations, but instead is defined as an off-road vehicle (since the lack of a VIN and on-road equipment indicates that a vehicle was not manufactured primarily for use on public roads.) Such off-road vehicles are considered to be neither motor vehicles nor motorcycles, as those terms are defined under federal law. Under present-day NHTSA rules, the final decision as to whether such federally defined off-road vehicles may be legally operated on public roads is determined by the laws of the state in which the vehicle is being operated.

==== State and local laws ====
The legal status of an ICE motorized bicycle in the United States is presently determined by the laws of each state and/or local jurisdiction. Several states allow ICE motorbikes to be operated on roadways without registration, tax, or licensing in the same manner as bicycles, providing certain restrictions are observed. Many state jurisdictions use limits on top speed and/or engine displacement to determine if ICE motorized bicycles require registration and licensing—sometimes as mopeds, sometimes as motorcycles. Some states prohibit the use of motorbikes on multi-use recreational paths or high-speed, limited access roadways, while others require additional safety equipment for operation on public roads, such as wearing a helmet. Many United States cities and other local jurisdictions may impose additional restrictions upon ICE motorized bicycles when operated on public streets and roadways.

== Legal status of electrically powered bicycles ==
The laws on electric motor-powered bicycles or E-bikes vary considerably according to country. In many nations, a top limit on the power of the electric motor is imposed if the vehicle is to be legally classified and/or taxed as a motorized bicycle.

=== Australia ===
In Australia, electric power-assisted bicycles do not require registration, provided that it:

- Is designed to be propelled primarily by human power (in most but not all states); and
- Has one or more auxiliary propulsion motors attached that have a combined output of no more than 200 watts or 250 watts if complying to European Standard for Power Assisted Pedal Cycles (EN 15194).

=== Canada ===
In Canada, eight provinces currently allow the operation of motorized bicycles using low-powered electric motors capable of a maximum speed of 32 km/hour under the definition of power-assisted bicycles. The Province of Ontario introduced a three-year trial ending October 2009 for these bicycles, which are now officially defined as Power-Assisted Bicycles by the Ontario Ministry of Transportation with specific parameters.

In accordance with federal law, all power-assisted bicycles, regardless of province, must 1) have a maximum of three wheels; 2) have steering handlebars and pedals; 3) use an electric motor of 500 W output or less for propulsion; 4) must not be capable of speeds faster than 32 km/h (20 mph) on level ground using motor power alone; and 5) bear a permanently affixed label by the manufacturer stating in both official languages that the vehicle conforms to the federal definition of a power-assisted bicycle. Power-assisted bicycles are required to use electric motors only, and may not be operated on certain provincial controlled-access highways or where prohibited by municipal law. Age restrictions vary from province to province, but all require an approved helmet. Some versions (e.g., if capable of operating without pedaling) of e-bikes require a drivers license in some provinces and have age restrictions. Vehicle licenses and liability insurance are not required. E-bikes are required to follow the same traffic regulations as regular bicycles.

=== Greece ===
In Greece, bicycles assisted by an electric motor up to 0.25 kW are clearly allowed by the traffic regulation and they are still considered as regular bicycles. Therefore, all laws for bicycles are applied to e-bikes too. No license is required to drive them.

=== Japan ===
In Japan, only following exceptional electric motored vehicles are regarded as regular bicycles or pedestrian in law.

- the pedelecs (electric-motor assisted bicycle) which the maximum power assist ratio in times are 2 under 10 km/h (6.2 mph), 2 - (speed in km/h minus 10) / 7 between 10 – 24 km/h (6.2 - 14.9 mph) and zero over 24 km/h (14.9 mph): as regular bicycles.
- electric-motored shopping cart, trolley bag or rollator within the size length 120 cm, width 70 cm, height 109 cm, maximum speed limit at 6 km/h (3.78 mph), without any sharp protrusions and that have automatic stop function : as pedestrian.
- electric-motored mobility scooters or wheelchairs within the size length 120 cm, width 70 cm, height 120 cm, maximum speed limit at 6 km/h (3.78 mph), without any sharp protrusions and that have automatic stop function : as pedestrian.

Save for the exceptions above, any vehicle with electric motors is regarded as car, motorcycle or motorized bicycle. Other restrictions are just the same as the one with internal combustion engines, where electric motor of 600 W by ICE 50 cc, motor of 1 kW by ICE 125 cc. In well-known, Segways are regarded as motorcycles and ordinal electric bicycles with regular output motor are as motorized bicycles, so they are illegal, as they are, in Japan.

=== United States ===
In the United States, federal law exempts low-speed electric bicycles from Department of Transportation and NHTSA motor vehicle regulations, and they are regulated under federal law in the same manner as ordinary bicycles. The Consumer Product Safety Act defines the term low speed electric bicycle as a two- or three-wheeled vehicle with fully operable pedals and an electric motor of less than 750 watts (1 horsepower), whose maximum speed on a paved level surface, when powered solely by such a motor while ridden by an operator who weighs 170 pounds, is less than 20 mph (15 U.S.C. 2085(b)). At the present time, neither the DOT nor the NHTSA restrict the assembly of e-bikes for use on public roads, although commercially manufactured e-bikes capable of speeds greater than 20 mph are considered motor vehicles and thus subject to DOT and NHTSA safety requirements. Consequently, the laws of the individual state and/or local jurisdiction govern the type, motor wattage, and speed capability of e-bikes used on public roadways (see Electric bicycle laws). As long as the bicycle is capable of pedal propulsion, most U.S. states currently do not distinguish between designs that may be self-propelled by the electric motor versus pedal assist designs in which the electric motor assists pedal propulsion by the rider.

== Power sources ==
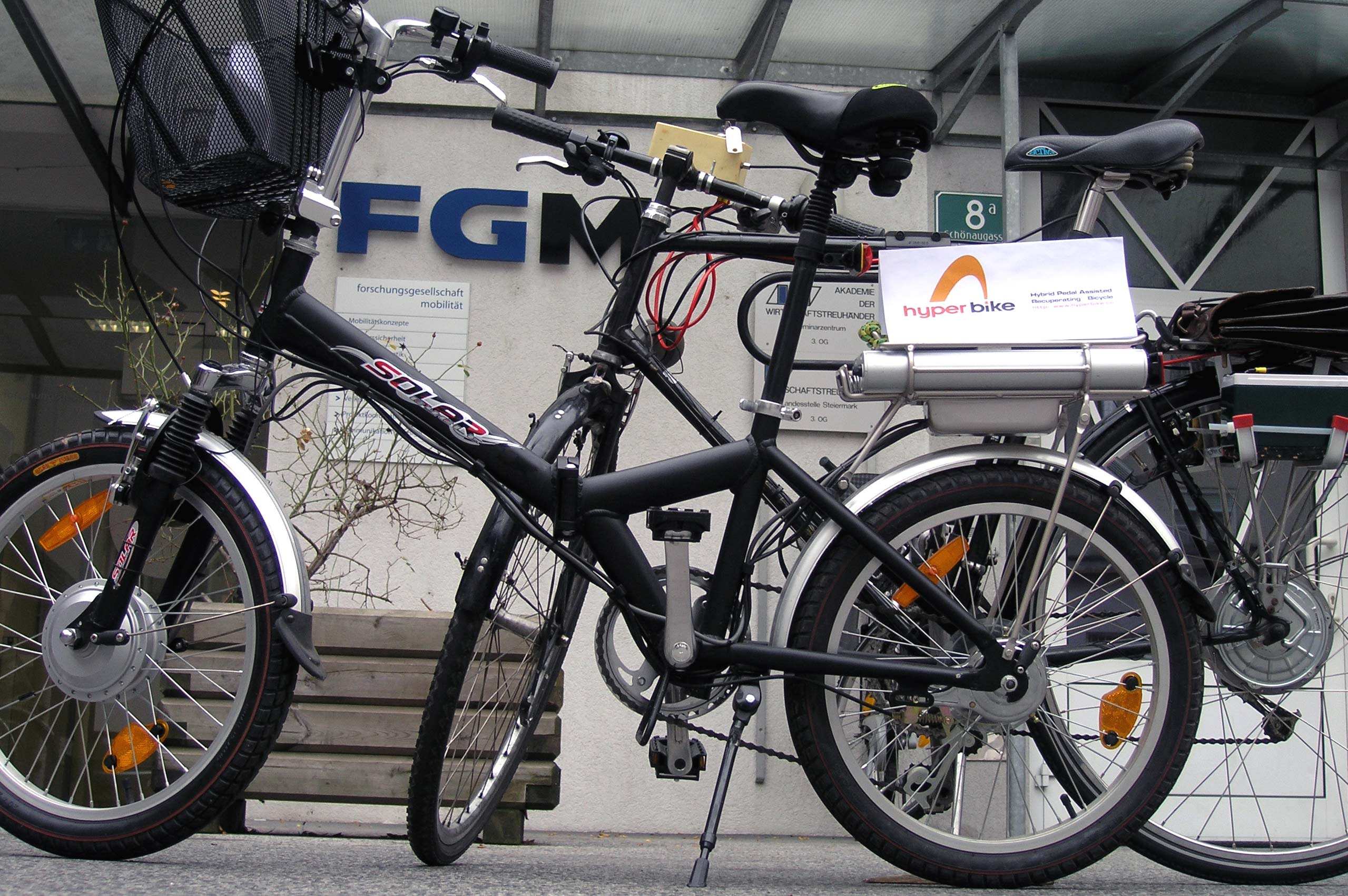
Different types of electric hub motor

Historically, internal combustion engine (ICE) designs dominated the motorized bicycle market, and still do today. Most still use small two stroke or four stroke IC engines.

Power can be applied to the drive wheel in a number of ways:

- the front or rear wheel may be powered directly by a motor built into the hub (e.g. Singer Motor Wheel, Copenhagen Wheel). This avoids the need to transfer power to wheel by some other means. The downside of this system is that often, the original wheel must be replaced for the wheel with the hub motor.
- an engine or motor mounted in the frame (called a frame mount), under the frame, or behind the rider (called a rack mount) may drive the rear wheel via a sprocket with a chain or a rubber belt. This is called "chain drive" and "belt drive" respectively. Besides connecting the engine to a sprocket, the engine can also be connected directly to the crank. This is called "crank drive" or "mid-drive" and also allows incorporating the gears of the bicycle in the motorized system. Most of these bikes and kits are under 50 cc and do not have to be registered in most states (the exception being the Whizzer NE5).
- power may be transferred to a wheel from a motor mounted directly above, by bringing a powered roller or rubber belt into contact with the tire. These are called "friction drives".

=== Internal combustion ===
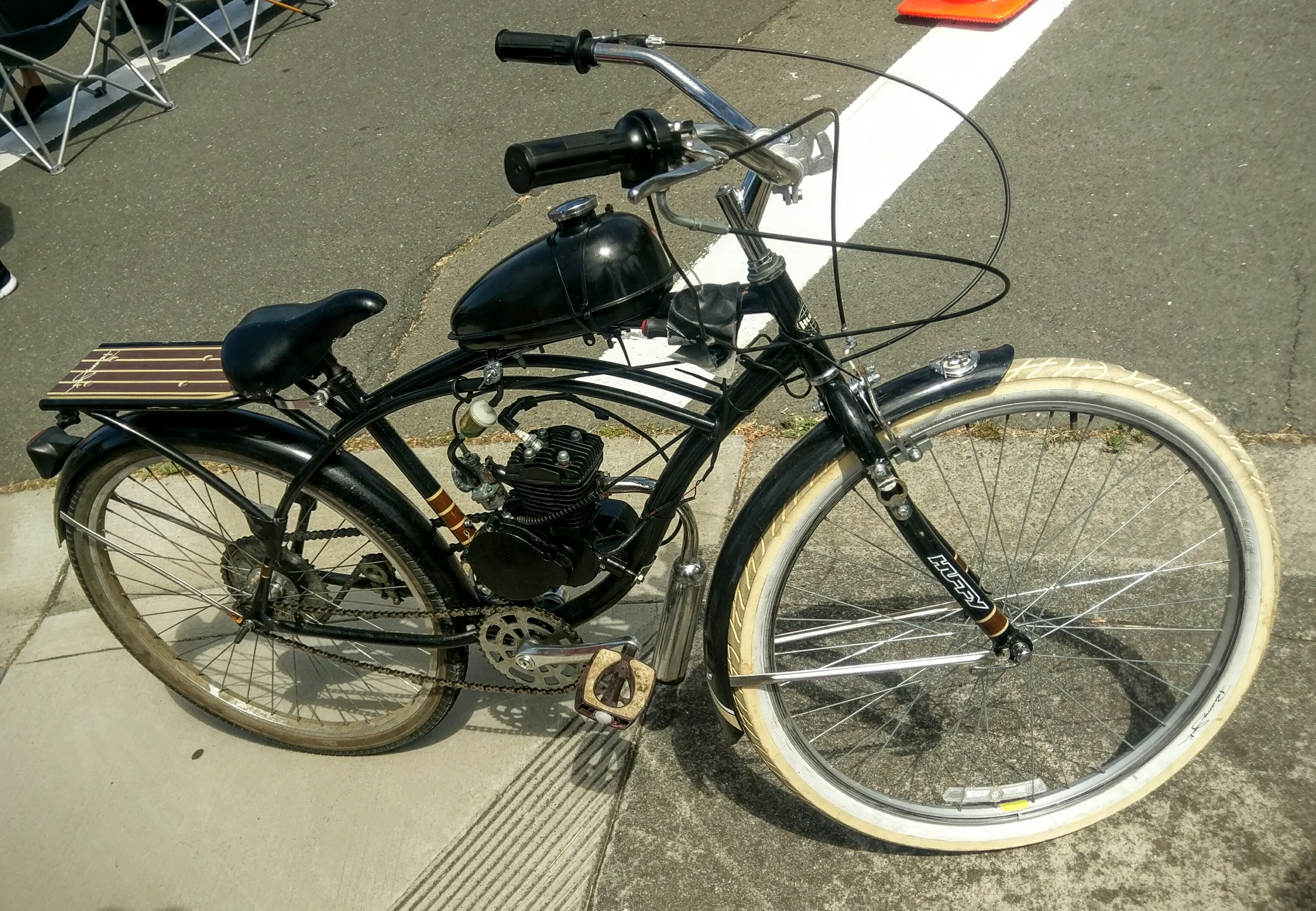
A Huffy bicycle converted with a bolt-on engine and gasoline tank

Small two-stroke, bolt-on gasoline bike motors and adapter kits for bicycles had a brief surge in popularity in the late 1960s and early 1970s in the United States and Canada. These engine kits were designed or marketed by both small and large companies, including Bike Bug, Tas Spitz, and even Sears, which sold the Free Spirit, and Little Devil engine kits. Most of these kits were designed to use lightweight, low-cost two-stroke engines from Japanese manufacturers such as Tanaka. During the late 1990s, the arrival of inexpensive two-stroke engines and chain-drive transmissions from mainland China, designed to mount to bicycle frames, helped spark a new wave of United States consumer interest in motorized bicycles. Increasingly tighter United States emissions laws have made it more difficult for traditional two-stroke engines to pass emissions requirements, though Tanaka Inc. has since introduced a clean-burning "Pure Fire" line of two-stroke motors.

Increasingly, designers of ICE motorized bicycles and other small-engined off-road vehicles are turning to four-stroke gasoline engines, which consume less fuel and oil, and tend to be quieter while producing fewer emissions. The Honda 49 cc GXH-50, Shandong HuaSheng 49 cc 142F, Robin/Subaru 25 cc, and other small four-stroke engines are commonly used as part of an engine/transmission combination for adaptation to a variety of bicycle frames.

=== Electric ===
Electric bicycles have become one of the most popular vehicles used for transportation across the world. Millions have been sold in Asia and Europe. Sales in the United States and Australia have increased sharply since the late 1990s.

=== Hybrid electric/petroleum ===
Bicycles can also use hybrid systems including both internal combustion and electric power sources, either in parallel, or in series. The first practical series-hybrid electric/petroleum system used the engine to turn a generator that charged the batteries directly, maintaining or increasing battery charge levels while riding the bicycle.

Since these vehicles combine three forms of energy electrical, petrol (liquid fuel) and human power, they can be also known as tribrid electric bicycles.

=== Other power sources ===
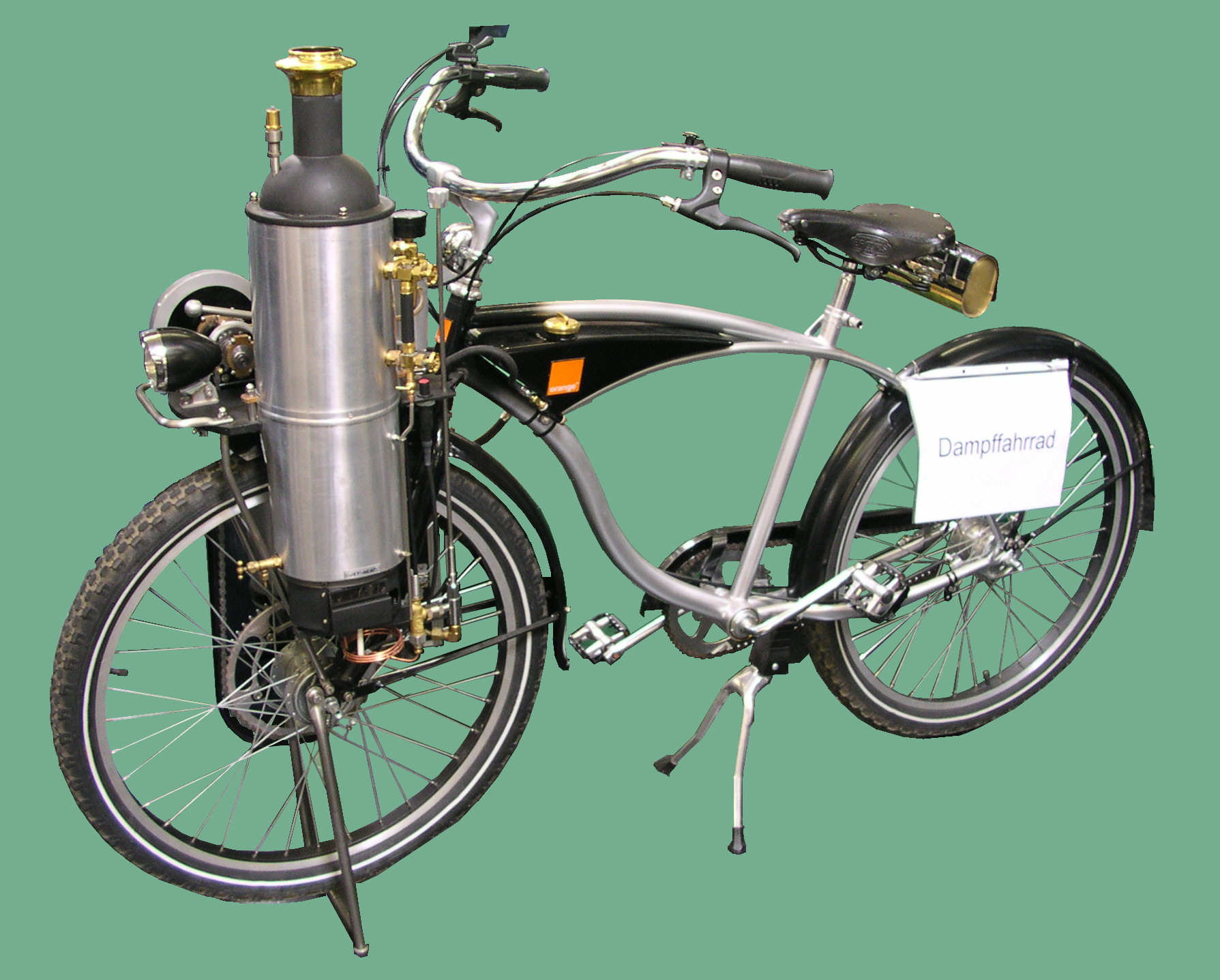
A steam-powered bicycle

Individuals have built bicycles powered by steam and air engines, and there are many known jet propelled bicycles. No large-scale manufacture of any of these is known (though jet-powered bicycles have been created by hobbyists, as seen in some homemade videos on websites such as Google Video and YouTube).

== Environmental effects ==
The environmental effects of motorized bicycles vary according to the power source. Most electric bicycles are considered by some to be zero-emissions vehicles, as they emit no combustion byproducts. However, the environmental effects of electricity generation and electric power distribution from plants generating power from fossil fuels, as well as manufacturing and disposing of (limited life) high storage density batteries containing toxic materials must also be taken into account. Older two stroke engines, commonly use in motorized bicycles powered by internal combustion engines often emitted more pollution than automobiles due to partial combustion of oil included in the fuel, but this is not the case with four-stroke or newer 2 stroke motor designs.

== See also ==
- Electric bicycle
- Electric motorcycles and scooters
- Outline of cycling
- Low-speed vehicle
- Timeline of transportation technology
- Mechanical doping - illicit usage of motors in cycle racing
- List of motorized trikes
- Motorcycle
- List of motorcycles of the 1890s
- List of motorcycles of 1900 to 1909
- List of motorcycles of the 1910s
- Safety bicycle
- Riquimbili
