= Whizzer (motorcycles) =

Line of bicycle engines

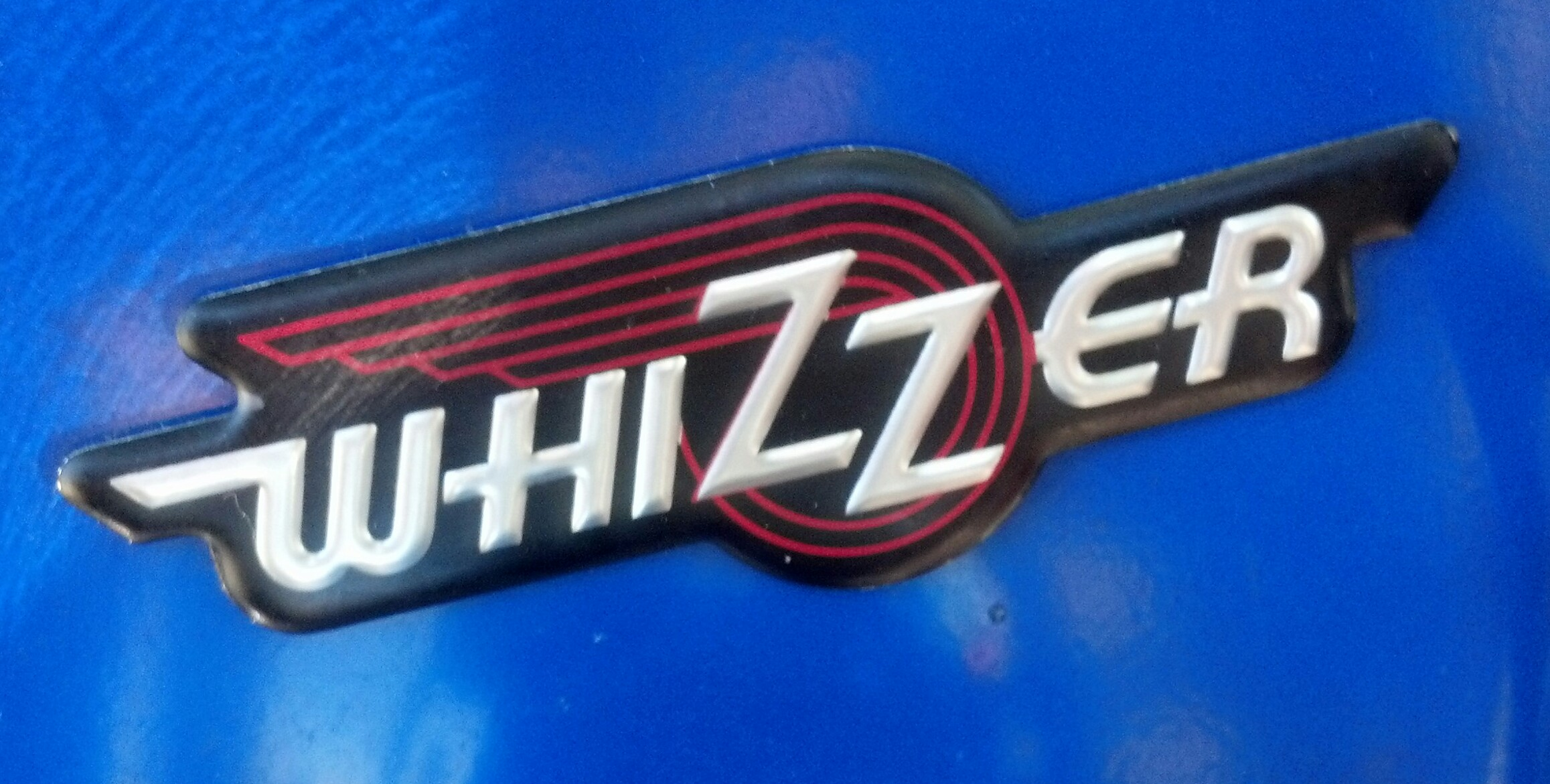
Whizzer emblem

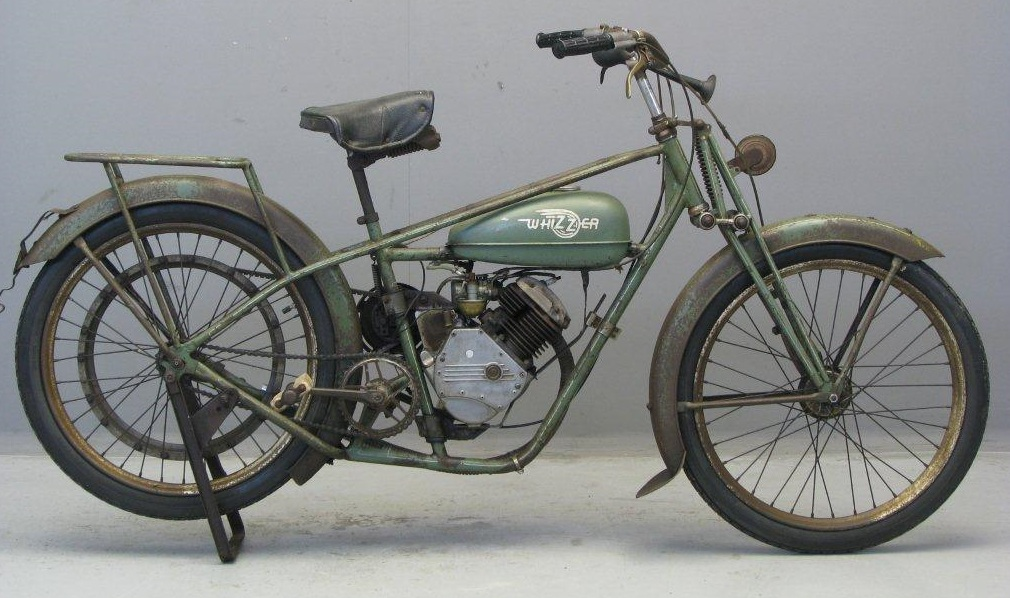
1947 Whizzer Luxembourg (built in Europe)

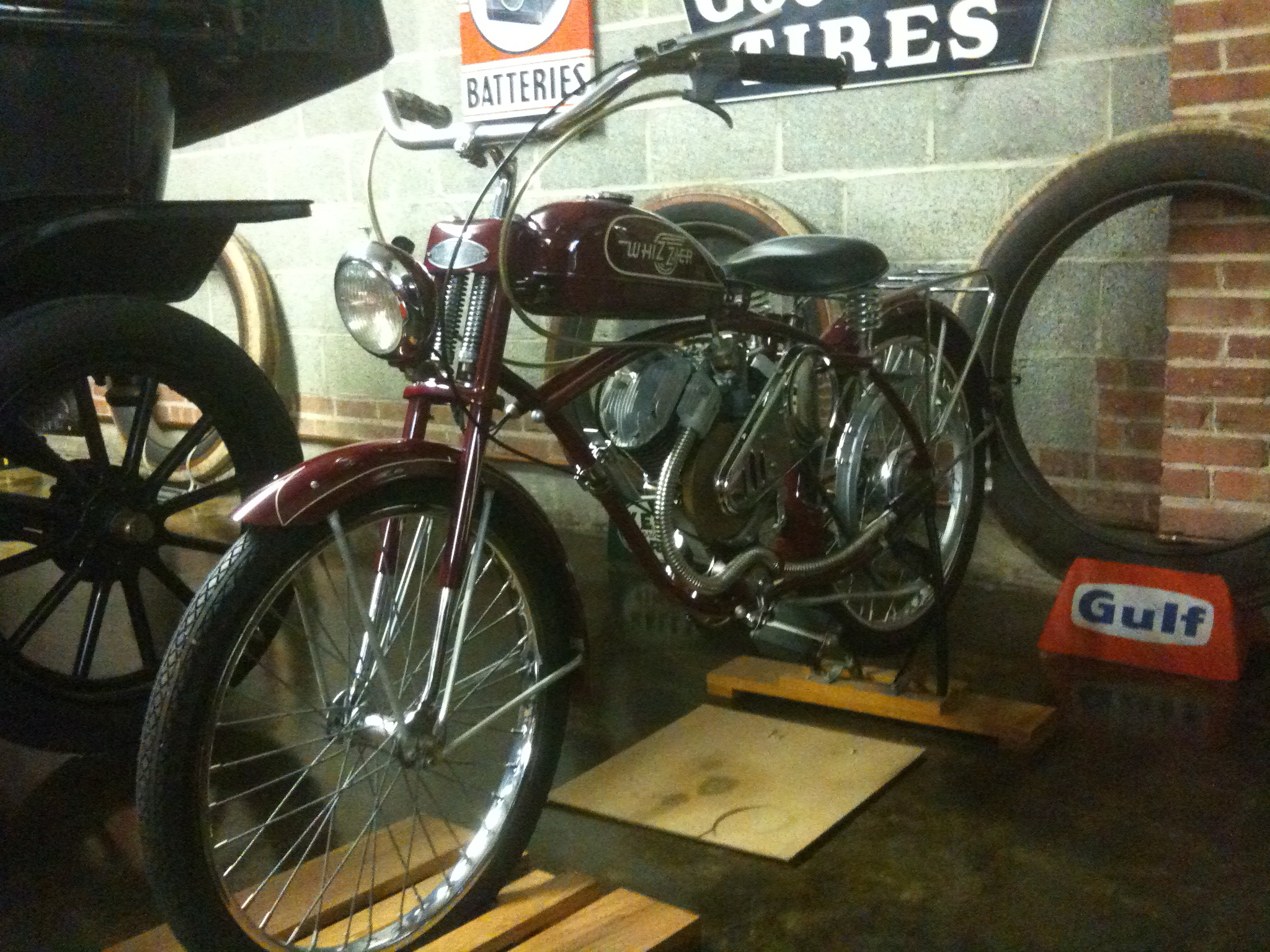
1952 Whizzer Pacemaker "700" Series, 3 hp 8.45 cu. in. (138.47 cc), $189.33

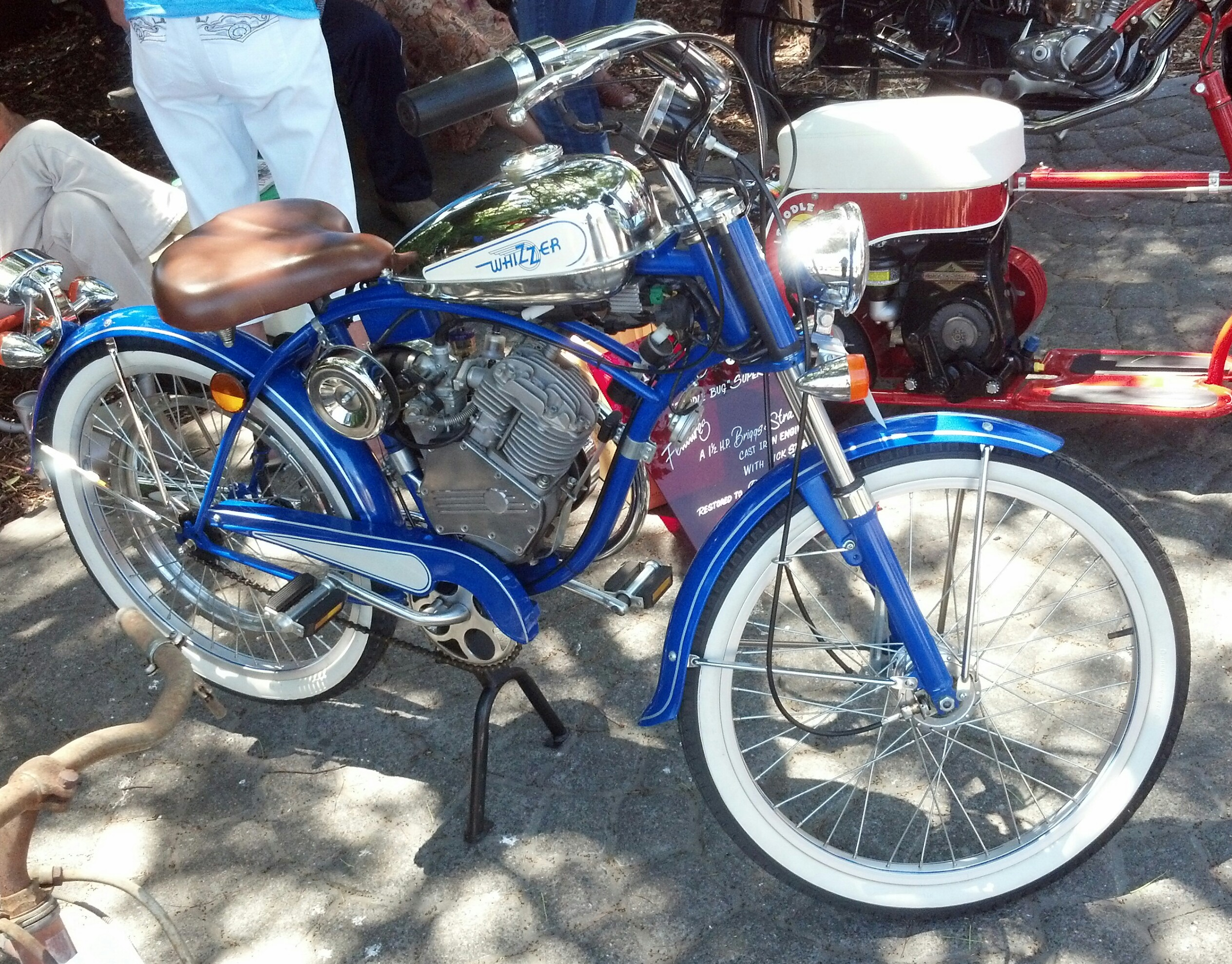
New model Whizzer (production began in 1997)

Whizzer bicycle engines are a line of bicycle engines that were produced in the United States from 1939 to 1965. They were commonly sold as kits to be assembled and attached to a consumer's bicycle thus creating a motorized bicycle. Whizzer U.S.A. re-appeared in 1997 to sell an improved version, pre-assembled on an old Schwinn-style bicycle frame.

== History ==
The Whizzer bicycle engine was first produced in 1939 by Breene-Taylor Engineering, a Los Angeles-based manufacturer of airplane parts. By 1942, sales of the engines had not been entirely successful, having sold only about 2500 units. The Whizzer operation was then sold to Dietrich Kohlsatt and Martin Goldman.

By 1943, World War II was well underway, and Whizzer Motors were forced to lobby the United States Government for the right to continue production of what was argued to be a great way for defense workers to travel to and from work.

In 1948, Whizzer sold its first pre-assembled motorized bicycle, the "Pacemaker", for US$199.50 (equivalent to $2,700 in 2025).

The "Sportsman" – featuring 138cc, 3 hp engine, 20" wheels, kick starter and drum brakes – was released in 1949 for US$224.50 (equivalent to $3,000 in 2025), and US$239.50 (equivalent to $3,200 in 2025) for the Deluxe model with two-speed automatic transmission.

Whizzer motorcycle engines would cease to be produced in 1965 due to the increasingly competitive bicycle engine market.

In 1997, Whizzer motorcycles were brought back into production in the same style of the originals but with technological improvements. However, the Whizzer company (as of 2014) now appears to be "on a temporary hiatus from bike production" since at least 2009. Its website states that there are "still some dealers selling NOS bikes", and also that, "in addition to supporting dealers, Whizzer continues to offer replacement parts, accessories and collectibles for the new generation Whizzers."

A collection of Whizzer motorized bicycles was featured in Season 21 Episode 6 of "American Pickers", entitled "Mr. Whizzer."
