= Honda PC50 =

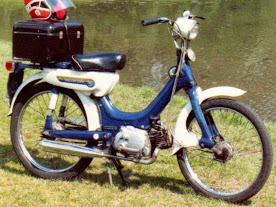
- 1977 Honda PC50 (With aftermarket back/top box)
- Manufacturer: Honda Motor Company
- Production: 1969–1983
- Predecessor: P50
- Successor: PF50
- Class: Moped
- Engine: 49 cc (3.0 cu in), air-cooled, four-stroke, single
- Compression ratio: 8.5:1
- Top speed: 50 km/h (31 mph)
- Power: 1.8 hp (1.3 kW) @ 5,700 rpm
- Torque: 0.29 kg-m @ 3,500 rpm
- Ignition type: coil
- Transmission: Fixed single gear by chain and sprockets and automatic clutch
- Suspension: Front: leading link fork, Rear: swingarm with hydraulic dampers
- Brakes: Drum: front and rear
- Tires: 2.00-19
- Dimensions: L: 1.755 m (69.1 in); W: .6 m (24 in); H: 1.03 m (41 in)
- Seat height: .78 m (31 in)
- Weight: 50 kg (110 lb) (dry)
- Fuel capacity: 3 L (0.66 imp gal; 0.79 US gal)
- Fuel consumption: 90 km/L (250 mpg_{‑imp}; 210 mpg_{‑US}) @ 25 km/h (16 mph)
- Turning radius: 1.3 m (51 in)

The Honda PC50 is a moped produced by the Honda Motor Company in Japan from May 1969 until at least 1983. The PC50, though much smaller and lighter, had some similar features to Honda's popular C50 /70 /90 Super Cub line, with a step-through pressed-steel frame, a fuel tank under the saddle, a chain cover, and optionally equipped with leg shields,

== Construction ==
=== Engine ===
A distinctive feature of the PC50 is the use of a four-stroke engine, at a time almost all pedal-equipped mopeds used two-stroke engines. Honda's early development of 50 cc four-stroke engines was a result of Soichiro Honda's dislike of the sharp noise of two-stroke engines.

The PC50 used two different engines during its production. The first models featured an overhead camshaft (OHC) engine derived from the Honda P50 moped which used an engine in wheel arrangement. The OHC engine was used from start of PC50 production until April 1970 when the OHC engine gave way to the OHV (pushrod) engine in the same cycle frame. The new model was re-designated PC50K1.

Simplicity is an important feature of the PC50 with an automatic clutch driving a fixed ratio, splash lubrication to the engine parts except for the use of a small pump to the parallel valves. The sump has an oil capacity of 0.8 - 0.9 litre for the OHC model and 0.75 litre for the OHV. The engine has an 8.5:1 compression ratio, coil ignition with no advance-retard mechanism, and fixed timing position. The engine output is rated as 1.8 bhp @ 5,700rpm, and carburetion served by a 14mm Keihin with a direct shutter choke operated on a simple side lever. The early OHC models had a generator which developed a total 6V x 15W output, which was uprated to 23W with the introduction of the OHV engine in 1970.

=== Moped drive ===
The Honda PC50 has no footrests or kick-start, it is a proper moped with a fully effective cycling capability engaged by the operation of a lever on the right hand crankcase. When the lever is engaged in drive ‘on’ mode, the drive is taken through a simple single gear and automatic clutch.

=== Chassis ===
The moped chassis is constructed from two pressed-steel halves welded together down the centre-line, with pressed steel leading link fork front, and swingarm rear suspension with telescopic dampers. The under seat 3-litre petrol tank is single sided on the left of the machine. A plastic toolbox takes the position of a dummy fuel tank on the right hand side. Behind the single seat is a useful pressed steel carrier rack.

== Variants ==
There were variants of the PC50 which were not available to the UK market including a standard model with telescopic front forks and the sports-like PS50. This was introduced as a sports variant of the OHC machine. The PS50 had a 3-speed gearbox with handlebar twist-grip selection, a manual clutch, a motor cycle style petrol tank, a dual seat and telescopic forks. Overhead valve (OHV) versions were also listed for the PS50.
