= VéloSoleX =

Moped manufactured by Solex

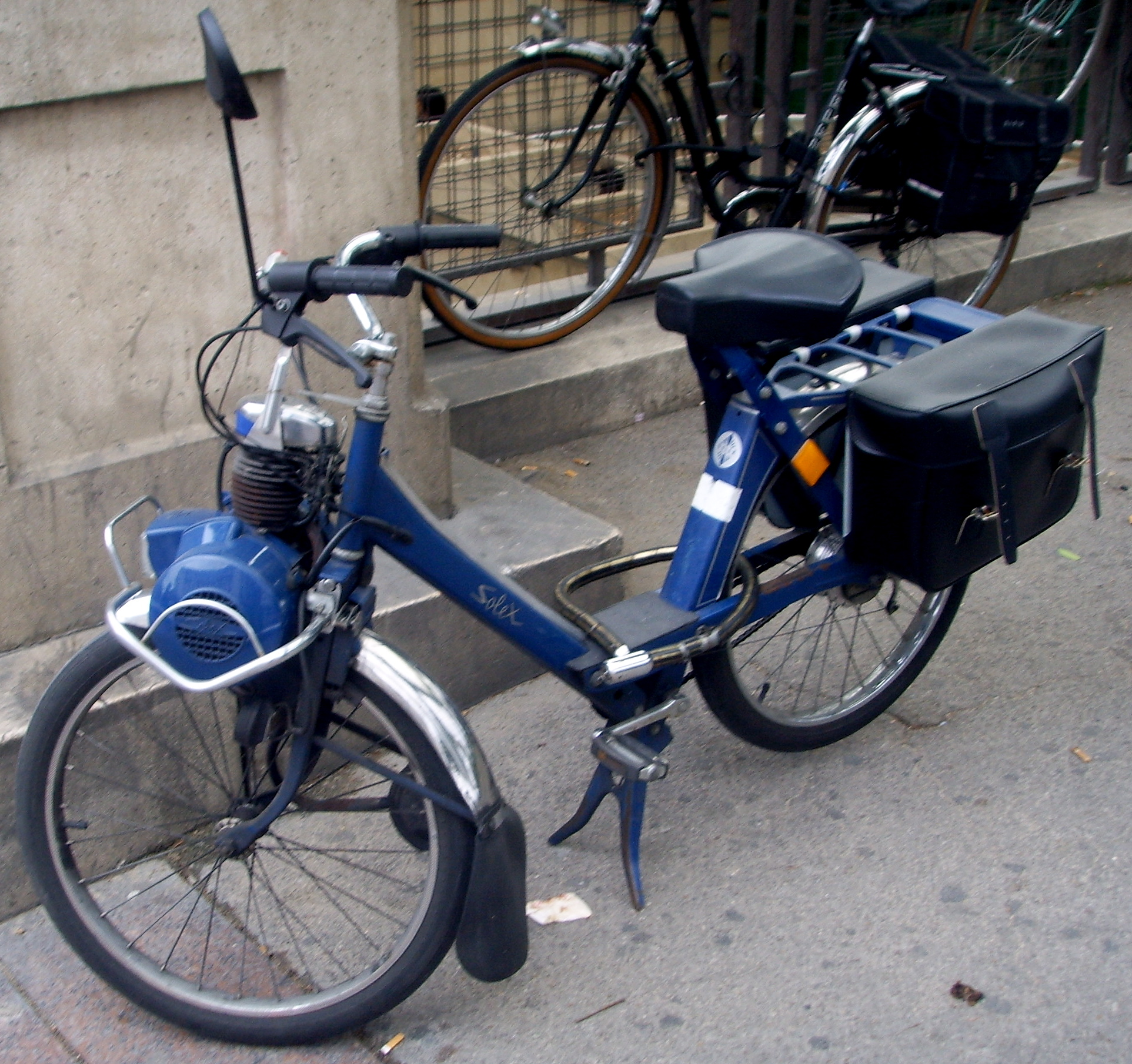
- A blue 1986 VeloSolex Motobecane 3800
- Founded: 1946
- Headquarters: Courbevoie, France
- Area served: Worldwide
- Products: Mopeds, motorized bicycles
- Website: www.solex.world/en/

VéloSoleX is a moped, or motorised bicycle, usually just referred to as 'Solex', which was originally produced by the French manufacturer Solex, based in Courbevoie near Paris, France. The company manufactured centrifugal fans for car radiators, carburetors, and micrometers before branching into assist motors and bicycles. The moped, originally created during World War II and mass-produced between 1946 and 1988, came in various iterations, while keeping the same concept of a motor with a roller resting on the front wheel of a bicycle.

Referred to, in the company's advertisement, as the 'bicycle which drives itself' (« la bicyclette qui roule toute seule »), it became extremely popular with school children, students, or plant workers because it was light and extremely economical.

== Ownership ==
Owned successively by Dassault, Renault, Motobécane/MBK, and VéloSoleX, it sold more than 7 million units worldwide before ceasing production in France in 1988. Production of the VéloSoleX restarted in both China and Hungary after 1988, but ceased in Hungary in 2002. VéloSoleX is now manufactured in France.

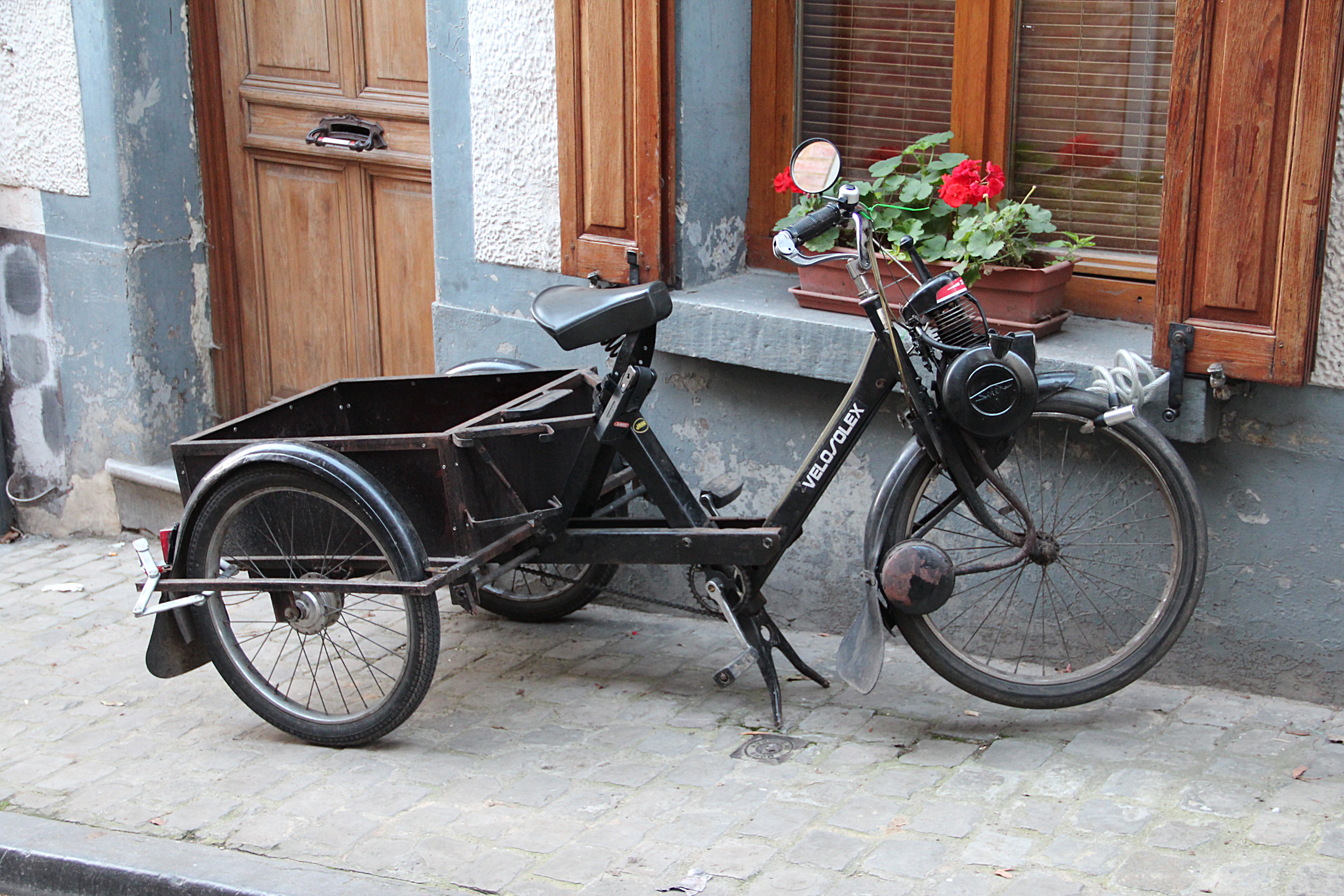
Black tricycled 1967 VéloSolex.

== History ==
The Solex motorized bicycle was conceived during World War II and marketed in 1946, with 8 million being sold between 1946 and 1988 in France and internationally, having been marketed in some 70 countries. The French design ceased production in 1988. It lived on for almost two decades as a licensed design produced in China and Hungary. Production returned to France in 2005, and as of 2011, the S4800 model was being marketed by VeloSolex America in North Bergen, New Jersey.

=== Models and modifications ===
- 1941: Prototype created, of which only a few remain, based on a bicycle
- 1946: A 45 cc model, of which many evolutions were made, with a 45 cc (2.7 cu in) engine developing 0.4 hp (0.30 kW) and no clutch, the engine has to be restarted every time the rider comes to a stop
- 1953: Model 330 with a 49 cc (3.0 cu in) engine and 0.5 hp (0.37 kW) using the same frame as the 45 but boosting power
- 1955: Model 660 with a new dedicated bicycle frame, but an unchanged engine
- 1957: Model 1010 updates the engine
- 1958: Model 1400
- 1959: Model 1700 uses the same frame as the previous version but introduces an automatic clutch and air cooling of the engine
- 1961: Model S2200 with an engine whose power is boosted to 0.7 hp (0.52 kW) over the next three years, to versions V1 and V2 will be produced.
- 1964: Model S3300 with a new square tube frame, which will remain the same until the end of production, adds a drum brake on the rear wheel
- 1966: Model S3800, which is the most common and most sold version of the brand over the years, later a Luxure or 'Luxe' version "S3800 luxe" and "S3800 super luxe" introduced color to the frame, which was always black (including the motor) until then, as well as having large wheels with blackwall tires. In 1968, the twist grip appeared allowing for reduced throttle at stops
- A smaller (children's) version is produced, the F4, with a replica plastic motor emitting clicking sounds to replicate the adult version.
- 1968: the Micron, which has very small wheels and no pedals. A three-wheel version would be produced in small numbers for children
- 1971: Model 5000, which has an upgraded kickstand, a white motor instead of a black one, smaller wheels than the 3800 with whitewall tires instead of blackwall tires, and is available in only four colors (yellow, blue, orange, and white)
- 1973: The Plisolex arrives, it is a folding version of the Model 5000, and was only produced in about 2,000 units
- 1974: Model 4600, destined only to be produced and exported outside France, and produced until 1978, it uses the frame of the 3800 and was produced in 4 colors (yellow, blue, orange and white); many made their way to the USA.

Moped not using a roller transmission

- 1969: The 'Flash' (later renamed the 6000) is a moped with disc brakes, an axle transmission instead of the roller and a fan-cooled engine.
- 1972: The 'Tenor', with a chain transmission. It will be the only moped produced with an engine made by another maker. L and S series are equipped with Franco Morini gyromat engines, then GL and GS series with an Anker Laura engine. There are a few S4 versions with a Franco Morini engine and a 4-speed gearbox.
- 2005: Model Black'n Roll S4800, a modernized version of the S3800. It is not produced under the Solex brand but rather Mopex
- 2011: Model 'e-Solex', an electric motor-powered bicycle which can be folded; Model 'Solexity', an electric motor-powered bicycle with an axle transmission.

== Electric ==
As of 2012, the French company offered three products:

- Velosolex — an electric folding bike which can reach speeds of up to 25 km/h (16 mph) and has a range of up to 50 km (31 mi).
- Solexity — an electric-assisted bicycle which can reach speeds of up to 25 km/h (16 mph) [Pedelec norm] and has a range of up to 60 km (37 mi).
- e-Solex — an electric bike which can reach speeds of 25–35 km/h (16–22 mph) and has a range of up to 40 km (25 mi).

== See also ==
- List of electric bicycle brands and manufacturers
- Outline of cycling
- Mobylette
