= Honda P50 =

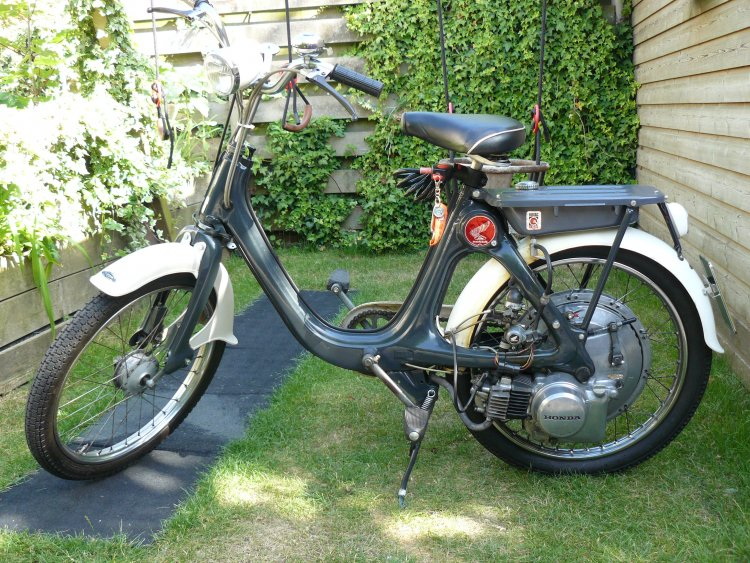
- Manufacturer: Honda Motor Company
- Also called: P25, Little Honda P25, Little Honda P50
- Production: 1966–1968
- Successor: PC50
- Class: Moped
- Engine: 49 cc (3.0 cu in), OHC, 4-stroke, air-cooled, single
- Top speed: 40 km/h (25 mph)
- Power: 1.2 PS (0.9 kW; 1.2 hp) @ 4,200 rpm
- Torque: 0.25 kg⋅m (1.81 lb⋅ft) @ 2,500 rpm
- Transmission: Continuously variable automatic transmission
- Brakes: Drum front and rear
- Tires: 2.00-17 (F); 2.25-17 (R)
- Wheelbase: 1.07 m (42.13 in)
- Dimensions: L: 1.67 m (65.75 in); W: .62 m (24.41 in); H: 1.02 m (40.16 in)
- Seat height: .79 m (31.1 in)
- Weight: 45 kg (99 lb) (dry)
- Fuel capacity: 2.5 L (0.7 US gal)

The Honda P50 (known as the P25 in some markets) was introduced in June 1966. It was the last motor-wheel moped design by Honda (and probably by any other large manufacturer).

The P50 features a step-through frame made from steel pressings, leading-link front suspension, plastic fenders and chainguard. The fuel tank is located above the rear fender, and the key distinguishing feature of the design is the 49 cc (3.0 cu in) engine being located at the extreme lower left rear of the frame, with all of the driveline components housed within the large hub of the rear wheel.

The engine is also 4-stroke — unusual when almost all pedal-equipped mopeds used simpler 2-strokes. Soichiro Honda disliked the sharp noise of 2-strokes, and the 4-stroke does not require oil to be mixed with the gasoline at every fill-up.
