= List of electric bicycle brands and manufacturers =

This article lists notable electric bicycle brands and manufacturers including electric unicycles.

Many bicycle brands do not manufacture their own product, but rather import and re-brand bikes manufactured by others, sometimes designing the bike, specifying the equipment, and providing quality control. There are also brands that have, at different times, been manufacturers as well as re-branders: a company with manufacturing capability may market models made by other (overseas) factories, while simultaneously manufacturing bicycles in-house, for example, high-end models.

- A2B Bicycles, United Kingdom
- Atala
- Basso Bikes
- Beistegui Hermanos, Spain
- Benno Bikes, United States
- BionX, Canada (defunct)
- Cytronex, United Kingdom
- ErokIT, Germany
- Mahindra GenZe, United States/India
- GeoOrbital, United States
- Gocycle, United Kingdom
- Italjet, Italy
- Kalkhoff, Germany
- Powabyke, United Kingdom
- Revelo Electric, Canada
- Riese und Müller, Germany
- Sinch Bikes, New Zealand
- Specialized, United States
- Superpedestrian, United States
- Tern, Taiwan
- Tidalforce Electric Bicycle, United States (defunct)
- Torpado
- Solex, France
- Wilier Triestina
- VinFast, Vietnam

== See also ==
- List of bicycle brands and manufacturing companies
- List of bicycle part manufacturing companies
