= Revelo =

Revelo refers to:

- Guillermo Manuel Ungo Revelo (1931–1991), Salvadoran politician
- María Amalia Revelo (1955–2021), Costa Rican businesswoman and government minister
- Revelo Electric, Canadian clean mobility company
- Revelo, Kentucky, unincorporated community in the United States
