= A to B =

A to B may refer to:

- A to B (EP), or the title song, by Matt Hires, 2010
- "A to B", a song by The Futureheads from The Futureheads

== See also ==
- "A to the B", a song by Infernal
- (A→B) Life, an album by mewithoutYou
- A2B (disambiguation)
