= Benno Bikes =

American bicycle brand

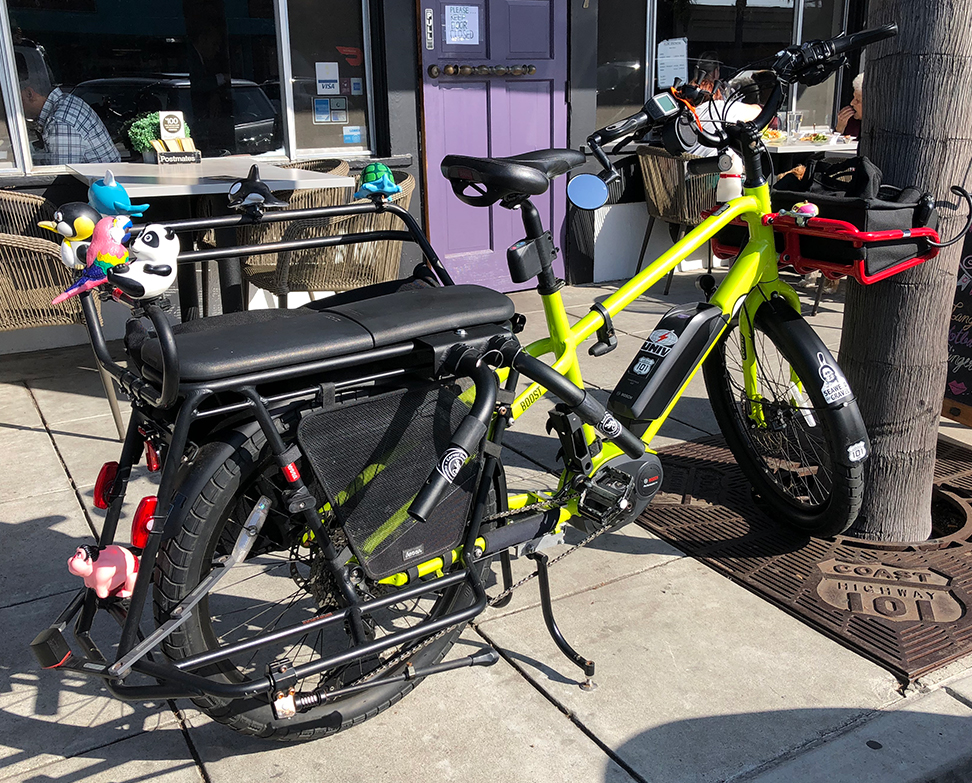
- Benno Bikes bicycle Boost E with accessories
- Type: Private
- Industry: Electric bicycles, Bicycles
- Founded: 2015
- Founder: Benno Baenziger
- Headquarters: Del Mar, California, United States
- Key people: Benno Baenziger (CEO)
- Products: Electric bicycles, accessories and related components
- Website: bennobikes.com

Benno Bikes is a bicycle brand and manufacturer of electric bicycles, cargo bikes, and comfort bikes, as well as cargo accessories and bicycle parts. It was founded in 2015 by Benno Baenziger (a.k.a. Bänziger) — who made a name and reputation by co-founding with Jeano Erforth, Electra Bicycle company, a modern electric bike manufacturer, in Del Mar, California. These electric bicycles are a crossover between comfort bikes and cargo bikes. A sobriquet for the concept of these bikes has been described and trademarked as "etility" by Benno. (Note: As Baenziger describes it: “At Benno Bikes we are driven to create bikes that provide true urban mobility and versatility. We are just as enthusiastic about running errands as other bike companies are about winning races.”)

== Background ==
Before starting Benno Bikes, Benno Baenziger co-founded the Electra Bicycle Company with business partner Jeano Erforth in 1993. Electra was "a leading lifestyle brand" that was acquired by a private equity group in 2007 and later sold to Trek Bicycle Company, in 2014.

== Products ==
The company manufactures electric cargo-carrying bicycles. Some of their bicycles have racks and fenders. Some models have an optional sidecar. The Company uses Shimano components, and is seen as being in the forefront of the e-bike industry. The Benno E-bikes all use the German-manufactured Bosch mid-drive pedal-assist motors.

The bikes are seen as an amalgam of being an everyday cruiser, with some cargo-carrying capacity. This could make them a replacement for an automobile.

=== Models ===
The company sells several different models: Benno 2020 The RemiDemi; and the award-winning Benno Boost E. Depending on owner preference, and using Bosch Performance Line CX Electric motor, the bikes combine power and stout design. The Benno Boost E — A Cargo E-Bike has been described as a bicycle which can replace an automobile. The electric bike category works well in an urban environment as an automobile replacement. The cargo bike has a rear rack which can hold 90 lb (41 kg) and a front rack which can hold 55 lb (25 kg). The bicycle has a top speed of 20 mph (32 km/h). The eJoy seeks to compete with vintage Vespas.

Benno Bikes manufactured some non-electric cargo models until 2019, however non-electric bikes made up only 20% of their sales.

== Distribution ==
Benno Bikes products are currently sold by more than 200 independently owned cycling stores in the United States and Canada. Outside North America, Benno Bikes has distribution partners in more than 15 countries worldwide with Germany, France, the United Kingdom, Norway, Australia, New Zealand and Switzerland (Note: Air Zermatt has acquired a Benno bike and serves as a "brand ambassador." "The exclusively produced copy is primarily intended to serve the flight assistants as a means of transportation on flat terrain.") among them.

Serfas became the sole distributor of Benno bikes in the United States, effective July 1, 2018.. Then in 2021, Quality Bicycle Products (QBP) took over as sole distributor.

== Recognition and awards ==
Bicycling magazine named several Benno models best in their category for electric bicycles. The Benno eJoy 9D was named Best Compact E-Cargo Bike and the Benno eScout was named Best All-Around E-Cargo, although both were noted to be "on the pricier end of the ebike spectrum".

In 2018 the company was the recipient of the Eurobike Award for the modular concept of its Compact eUtility Bike. The judges stated that the Compact eUtilityBike fills the gap between a cargo bike and a conventional bike. The jury found the Benno Boost E "to be solid, strong and versatile. We are particularly impressed by the wide range of transport options. The design is appealing and with its long wheelbase the pedelec is easy to control".

== International efforts ==
Benno Bikes Swiss GmbH was founded in June 2017, by Swiss inventor Samuel Weishaupt.

== See also ==
- List of electric bicycle brands and manufacturers
- Outline of cycling
