= Montague Bikes =

US manufacturer of folding bicycles

- Company type: Private
- Industry: Manufacturing, Bicycles
- Founders: David Montague; Harry Montague
- Headquarters: Cambridge, Massachusetts, U.S.
- Key people: David Montague (president)
- Products: Folding bicycles and cycling accessories
- Website: montaguebikes.com

Montague Corporation (commonly referred to as Montague Bikes) is an American company that designs, manufactures, and sells full-size folding bicycles. It is headquartered in Cambridge, Massachusetts.

== History ==
=== Early history ===
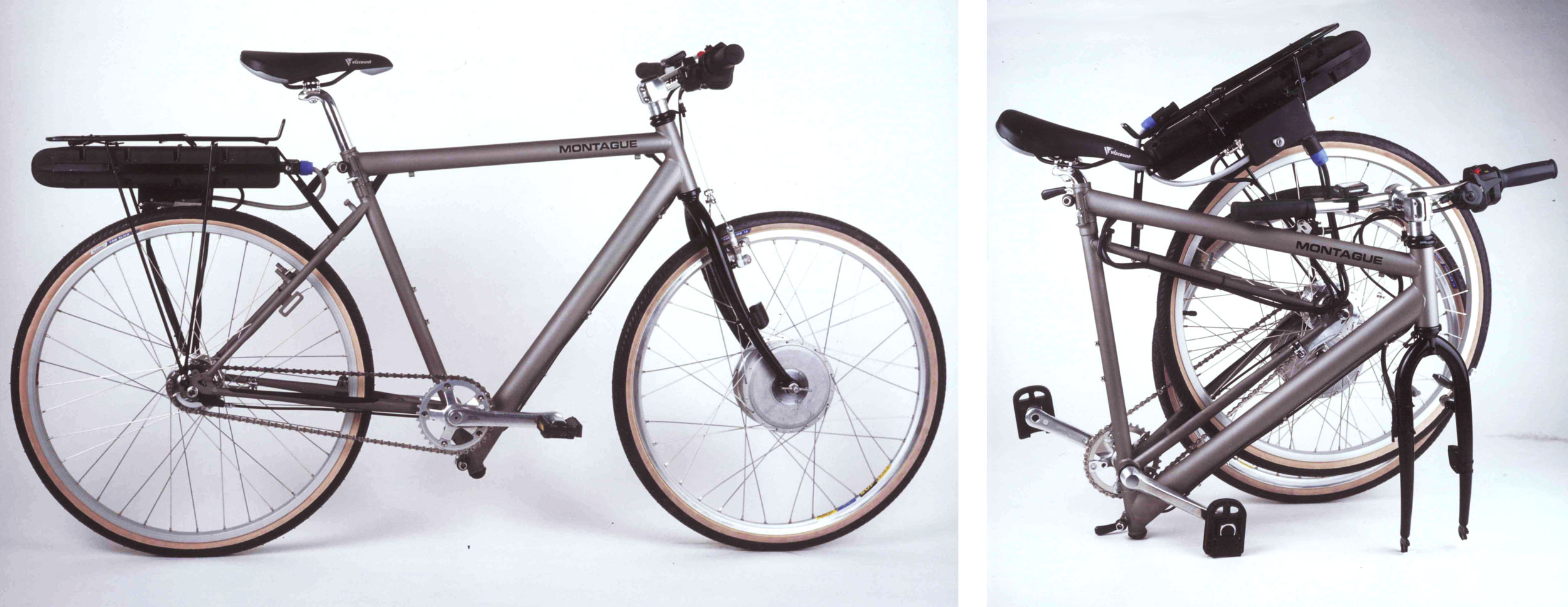
Montague Electric Bi-Frame from the early 1990s.

Montague Corporation was formed in 1987 by David and Harry Montague. Prior to the foundation of Montague Bikes, Washington-based architect Harry Montague began making plans to build a full-size folding bicycle that could accommodate his 6'2" frame. He started sketching designs for the bike in the early 1980s and had a prototype (the "BiFrame") by 1984. The BiFrame used the "Concentrus" system, which unites the two parts of the frame with concentric seat tubes, one nested inside the other.

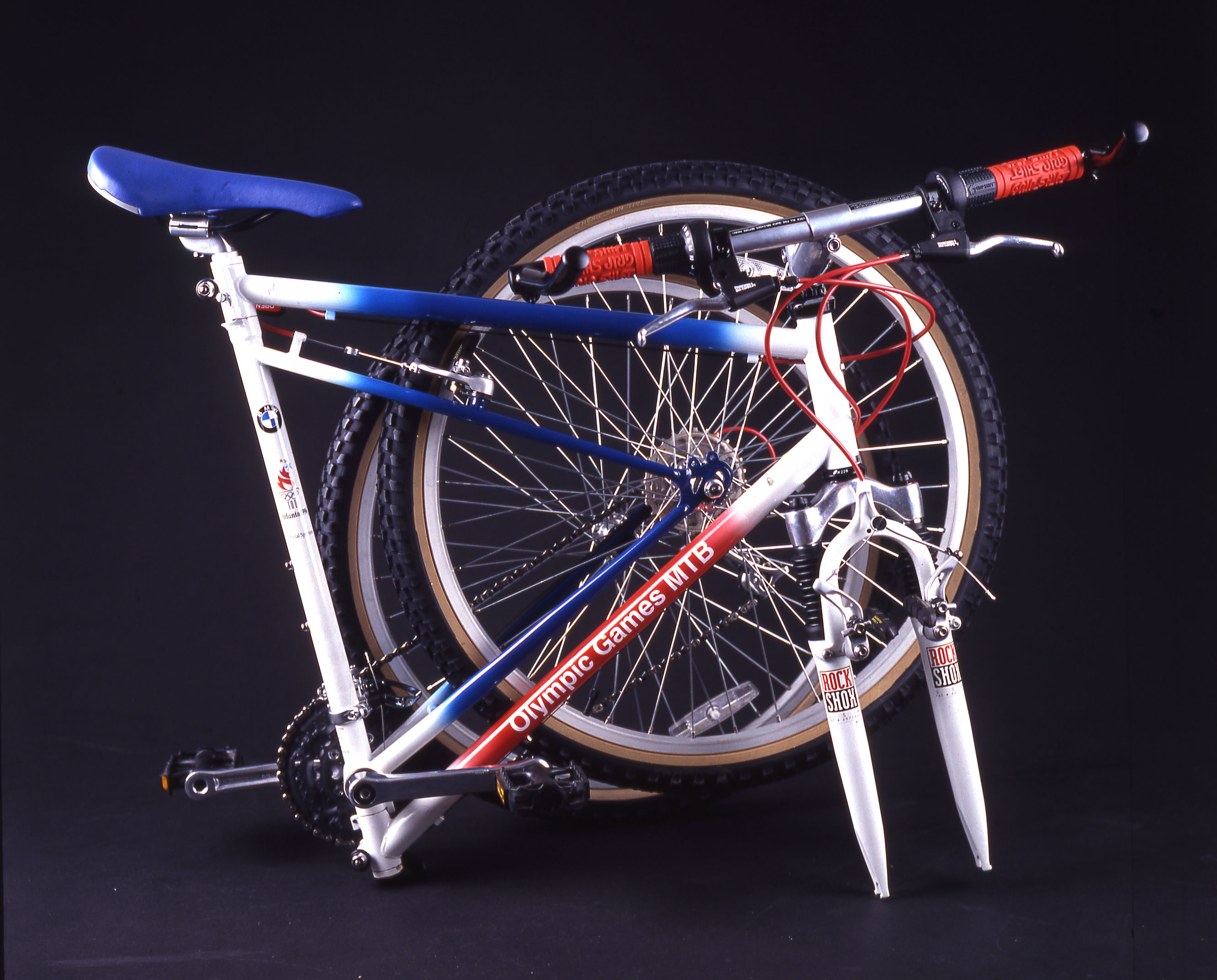
Montague BMW Olympic Bike from 1996.

Montague obtained a patent for the bike design and the Concentrus system by 1987. That year, his son David Montague, used his father's folding bike as a potential business model for an entrepreneurship project while attending Massachusetts Institute of Technology (MIT). With $300,000 in capital, the two launched and incorporated their folding bicycle company as Montague Corporation in Massachusetts later in 1987.

=== 1988-1996 BiFrame design and BMW partnership ===
The company began selling in the U.S. market in 1988. It also sold bikes in Canada, Europe, Japan, and in Great Britain through a joint marketing deal with the Raleigh Bicycle Company. In 1989, Montague sold around 2,200 BiFrames worldwide. While producing the BiFrame design, Montague worked closely with the Schwinn Bicycle Company, and in 1991 the Schwinn Montague M1000 was first marketed and sold through Schwinn dealers.

Beginning in 1992, Montague began producing a line of folding mountain bikes in a partnership with the car company BMW. The bikes were initially sold in Germany and came to American BMW dealerships in 1994. The Montague BMW BiFrame was chosen as the official mountain bike of the 1996 Summer Olympics in Atlanta, Georgia and was also featured in the closing ceremonies.

Popular Mechanics honored the company with a Design & Engineering Award for its design of the special BMW Olympic Games mountain bike. Other folding bike models Montague developed in the 1990s included the TriFrame tandem bicycle and the Montague Backcountry mountain bike.

=== 1997-2009 DARPA, Paratrooper and X-Series ===
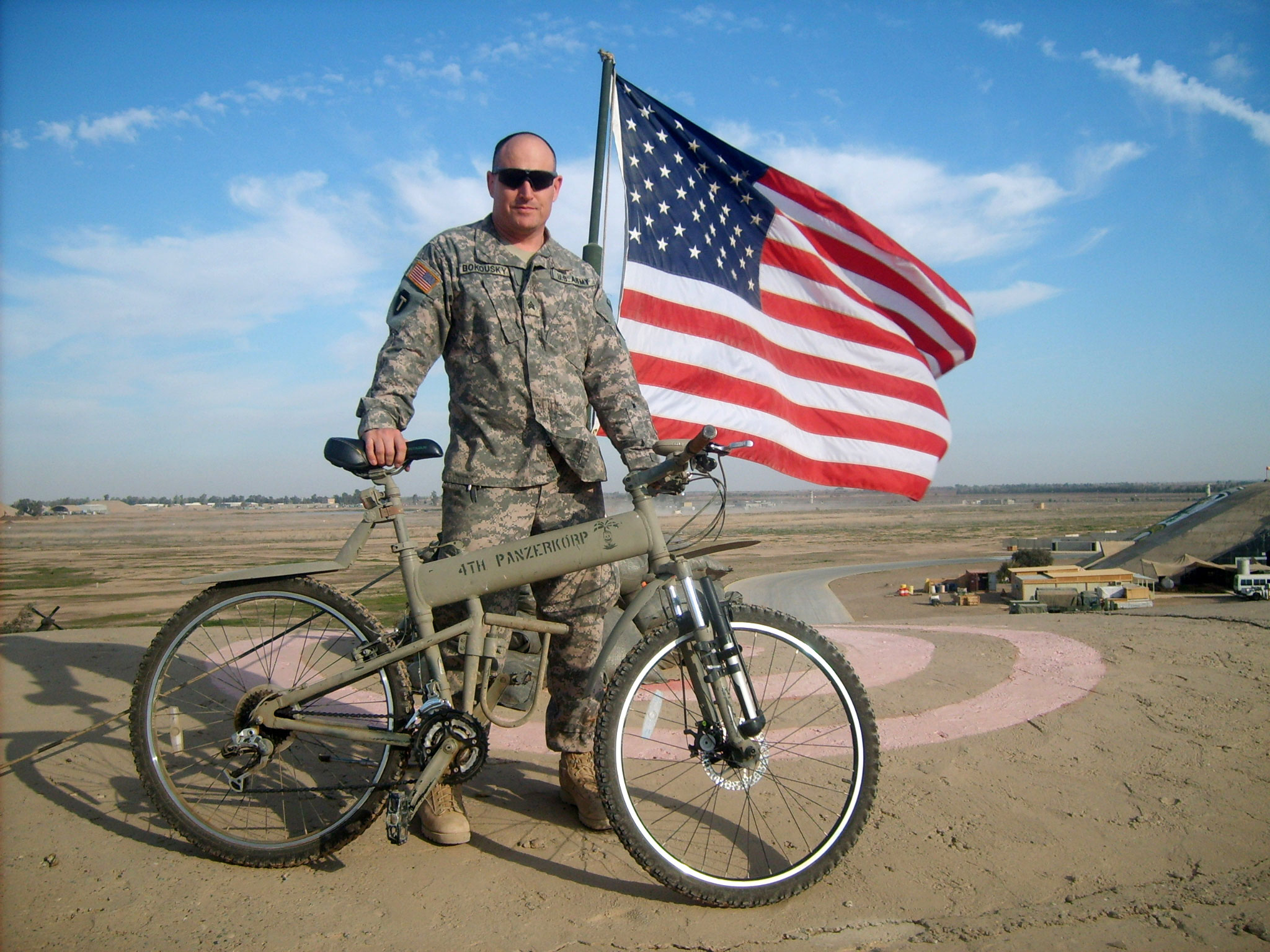
Picture of a Montague Paratrooper bike in Afghanistan.

In 1997, the Defense Advanced Research Projects Agency (DARPA) gave Montague a two-year grant to develop an all-terrain, heavy-duty, folding electric mountain bike that could be utilized by paratroopers. With this grant, the company created the Tactical Electric No Signature (TENS) mountain bike which was equipped with a battery-powered motor that was largely undetectable by ear, radar, or infrared devices. The bikes, which had a new "X-Frame" design, were used by U.S. military members in conflicts in Iraq and Afghanistan.

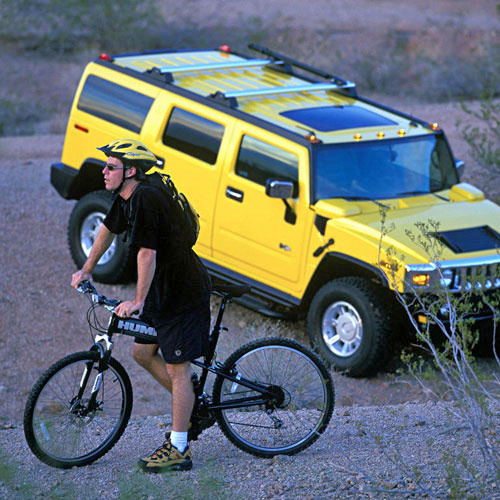
Montague Hummer Bike next to Hummer H2.

The first civilian bikes using the new X-Frame design (dubbed the "X-Series") were introduced in the late 1990s and early 2000s. The first two bikes in the X-Series were the Montague CX 21-speed Comfort Bike and the Montague MX 24-speed Mountain Bike. In 2001, the company released the Paratrooper military mountain bike, which was a commercial, non-electric version of the TENS bike it had developed for DARPA.

In the early 2000s, Montague developed a promotional bicycle, dubbed the "Hummer Tactical Mountain Bike," for General Motors' Hummer line of vehicles. Promotional distribution of Montague-designed Hummer bicycles took place through GM dealerships. In 2008, Montague introduced the SwissBike line which featured the company's first mountain bikes designed for road use, including the SwissBike LX and SwissBike TX Commuter. By 2009, Montague bikes were being sold in 18 countries with 400 dealers in the United States.

=== 2010 to present ===
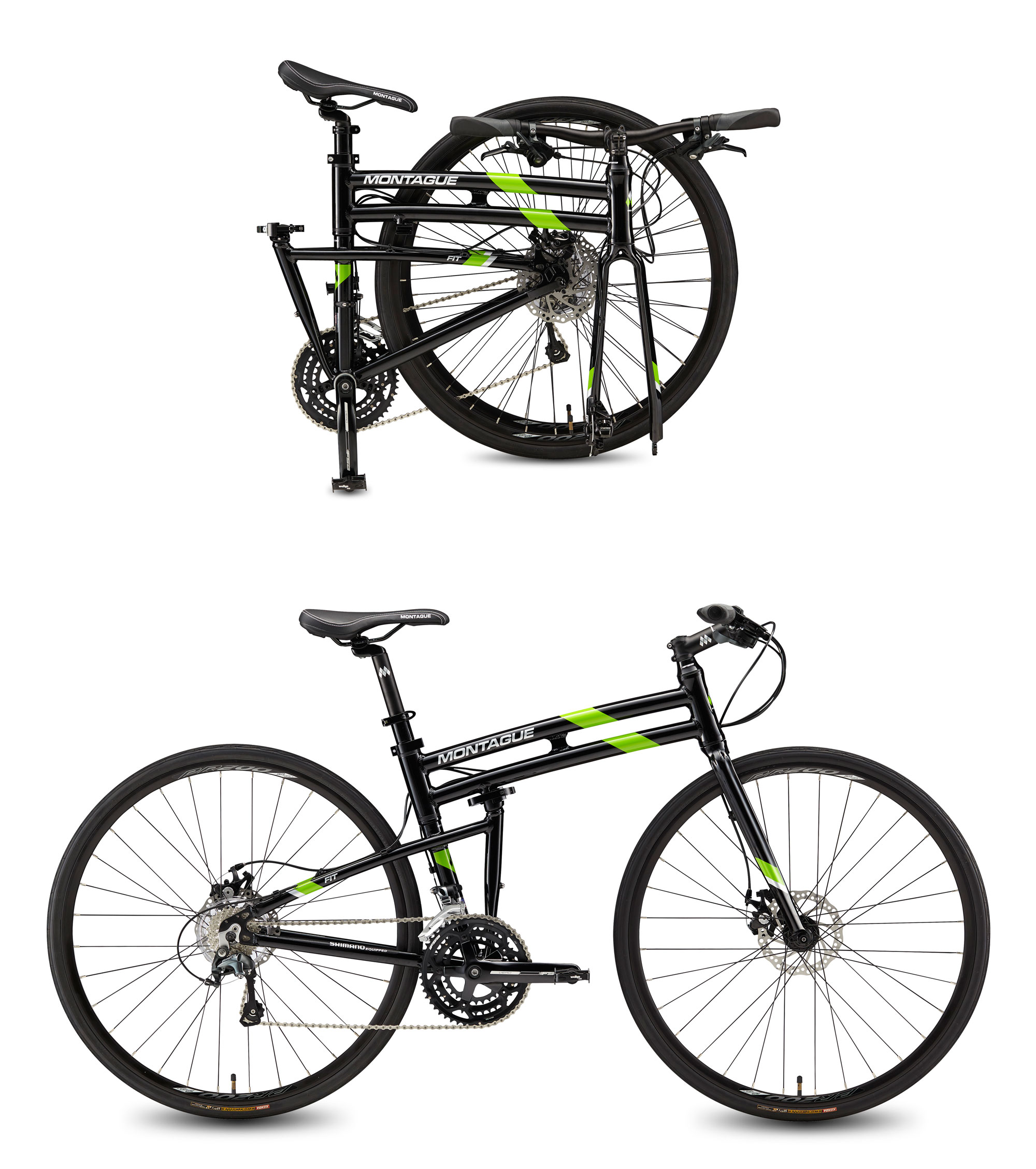
Montague FIT open and folded composite.

The company continued developing pavement-specific bikes into 2010 and beyond. The pavement versions were the first Montague bikes to feature 700c road wheels and a new double top tube design. In 2011, Montague added to its Pavement bike line with the Boston 8, the first folding bike to incorporate the Shimano Nexus 8 speed internal-gear hub. Montague also continued releasing new iterations of their Paratrooper line with the Paratrooper Pro in 2012. The following year, the company started selling framesets as standalone products, allowing manufacturers and hobbyists to incorporate Montague folding frames into their models.

In 2015, Montague helped institute the "Park & Pedal" program in the Boston area. The program encourages commuters to drive part of the way to work, park in one of several designated lots outside the city center, and ride their bikes for the remainder of the commute. It was originally devised by founder David Montague and was implemented in conjunction with the Massachusetts Department of Conservation and Recreation and the Executive Office of Energy and Environmental Affairs. The program was expanded to more locales in the Greater Boston area in 2016.

Montague introduced a new folding system called "DirectConnect" in 2016. It allows a bike to be folded using one release on the wheel and one lever on the bike's frame. The company also partnered with Shapeways to 3D print aluminum prototype components for its bicycles for the first time. It also launched several new models in 2016 including the Urban, Paratrooper Elite, FIT, and Allston, the first to employ a belt drive in place of a traditional bicycle chain.

== Products ==
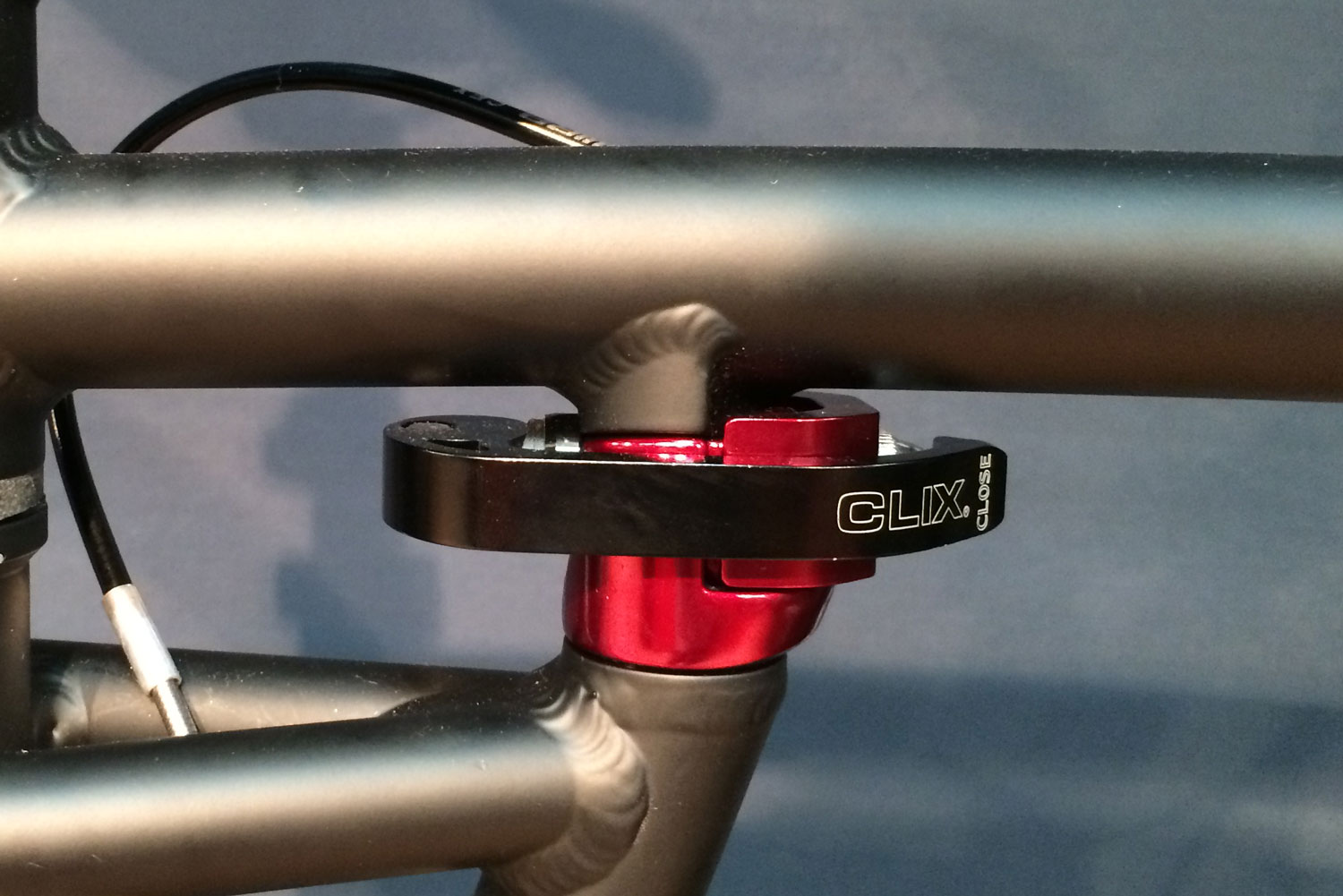
Closeup of DirectConnect Latch System.

Current Montague bike models use the patented DirectConnect folding system, and are equipped with full-size 26", 27.5", or 700c wheels. When folded, the bikes measure approximately 36" x 28" x 12". Montague has pavement-specific models that utilize 700c wheels, including: Boston, Allston, Crosstown, Urban, Navigator, and FIT. Some models (including the Navigator, Allston, and FIT) are equipped with Montague's "RackStand" which serves as both a rear rack and a potential kick stand when released from the seat tube.

Montague also produces the Paratrooper line of folding mountain bikes that utilize either 26" or 27.5" wheels. Included in the Paratrooper line are the Paratrooper, Paratrooper Highline, Paratrooper Express, and Paratrooper Elite. Some Paratrooper models, including the Highline and Elite, utilize RockShox suspension systems. The company also offers electric pedal assist models, including the E-Crosstown.

Several bike models use an Octagon adjustable steering assembly that allows the handlebar to be adjusted in height without the use of tools. Most Montague bikes also utilize a Shimano drivetrain. The Allston model is equipped with a Gates carbon belt drive and a Shimano Alfine internally geared hub rather than a traditional bike chain and hub gear setup.

== See also ==
- Bicycle infantry
- Tidalforce Electric Bicycle
