= Park and Pedal commuting =

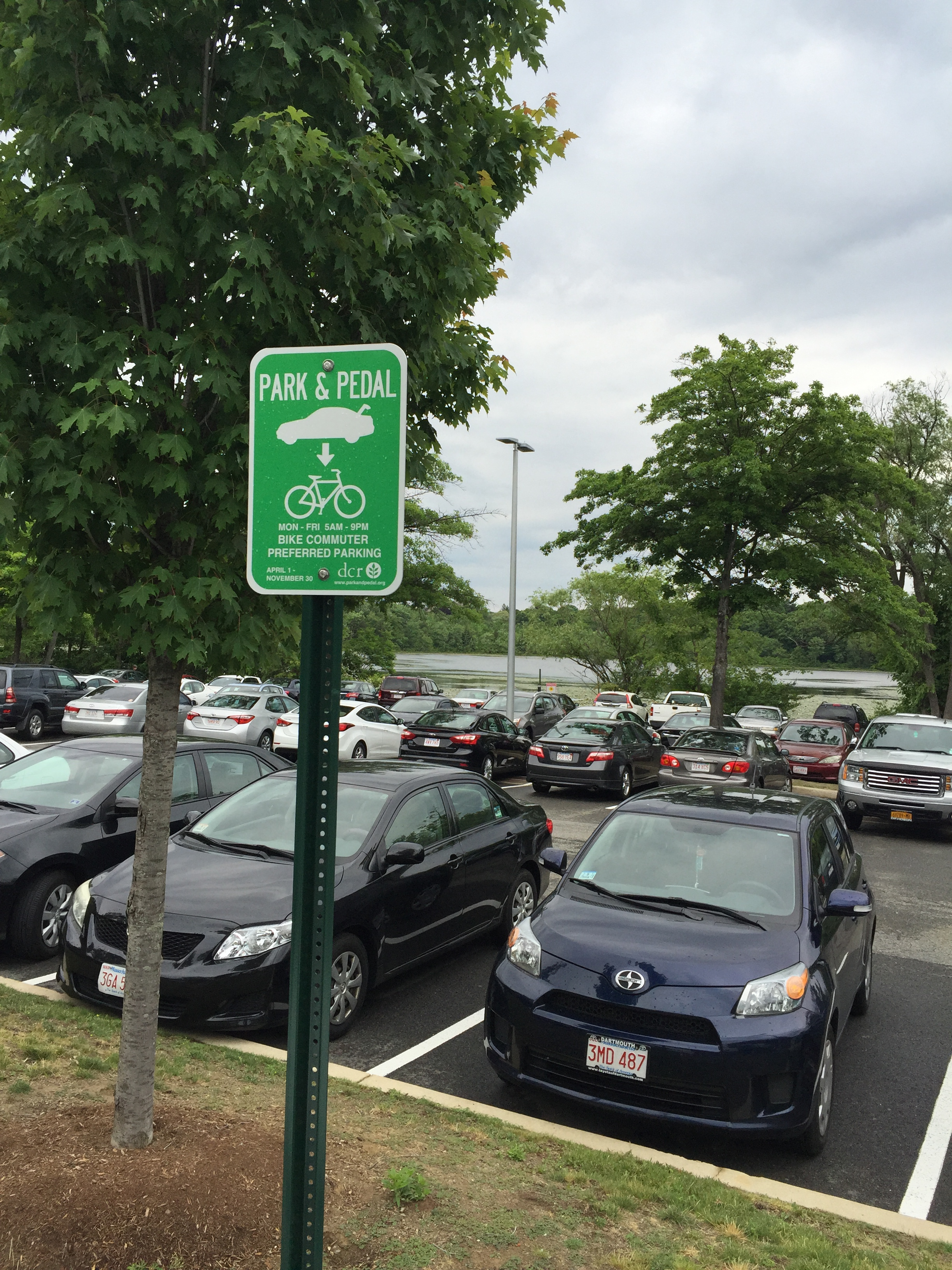
Parking signage for Park&Pedal lot location at DCR's Hammond Pond Reservation in Brookline, MA

Park and Pedal commuting (or Park&Pedal, Park-N-Pedal) is a bimodal form of commuting involving a motor vehicle and bicycle. Park and Pedal systems establish parking lots or spaces a comfortable cycling distance from city or employment centers. At the beginning of the workday, commuters leave their cars parked in the lots and pedal their bicycles the rest of the way to work. At the end of their workday, they do the reverse.

== Philosophy ==
The majority of commuters live too far from work to want to ride their bikes the entire distance – a study from 2012 shows the average one-way commute for US commuters is 18.8 miles. This leaves many would-be bike commuters without a realistic option to cycle to work.

Conversely, suburban car commuters often experience an increase in traffic near their urban destination traffic congestion, where the remaining distance can take a long time to navigate and park. This last-mile problem has sprouted many forms of intermodal transportation in urban areas around the world, in attempts to minimize wasted commuting time.

Park&Pedal facilities located only a few miles from their final destinations allow commuters to participate in bicycle commuting to experience its many benefits and avoid last- (and first-) mile congestion.

== Benefits ==
To a degree, Park and Pedal commuters share the benefits of bicycle commuting - by turning the most stressful part of their commute into a healthy bike ride. As one of the most efficient forms of transportation, cycling provides a low-impact cardiovascular workout. By parking their cars in more remote, less congested locations, commuters gain the health benefits of this workout while avoiding the high stress levels caused by traffic and parking difficulties near their final destination. Park&Pedal commuters also save money on parking and fuel consumption.

Employers benefit from improved employee health and morale when they park and pedal, they have lower direct and indirect healthcare costs, and can save significantly when parking is subsidized for their employees.

Further, by removing cars from heavily congested areas, far less time is spent sitting in traffic contributing to vehicle emissions, so the environment is another major beneficiary.

== History ==
People have been multimodal commuting for many years according to their own personal needs. However, the first official, large scale deployment of a Park and Pedal network did not start until 2014 when Montague Bikes teamed up with the Massachusetts Department of Conservation and Recreation and began deploying a network in the greater Boston area. The Massachusetts Executive Office of Energy and Environmental Affairs issued a press release in 2015 about the Park and Pedal network's formal ribbon cutting.

Park and Pedal was conceived by David Montague, founder of Montague Bikes in Cambridge, MA. In the early 2000s, Montague Bikes launched a Park and Pedal program, urging commuters to participate on their own accord

During 2014, Montague Bikes, together with local governments, cycling and environmental organizations, universities, transportation associations, and private industry worked to formalize the Park and Pedal Boston network. The official announcement and press coverage took place in the summer of 2015, with an event to promote awareness and recognize the efforts of everyone involved, including the neighboring town of Watertown.

In 2016, Boston expanded its Park and Pedal network to provide more options for commuters. Neighboring cities of Newton, MA and Bedford, MA also introduced Park and Pedal programs to expand the greater-Boston network.

In February 2017, the capital city of Canberra, Australia launched its first Park&Pedal program, with a carpark location adjacent to major roadways, connecting to an off-road path which commuters can ride almost the entire way to nearby employment centers, stress-free, and unencumbered by traffic and intersections.
