= Sinclair C5 =

One-person electric vehicle (1985)

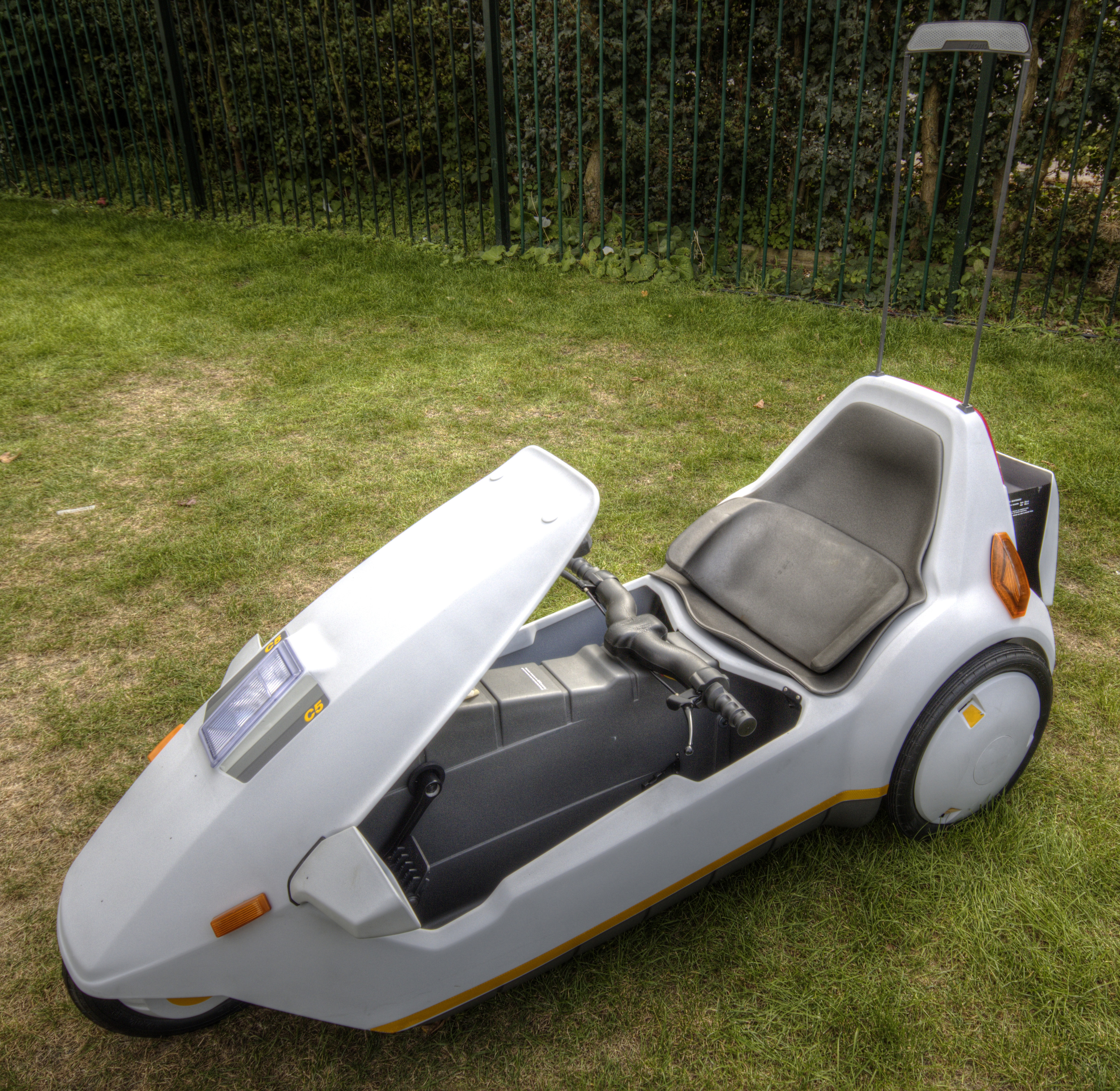

Overview
- Manufacturer: Sinclair Vehicles
- Production: 1985; 41 years ago
- Assembly: Merthyr Tydfil, Wales

Body and chassis
- Class: Battery electric vehicle
- Layout: Tricycle

Powertrain
- Electric motor: 250 W (0.34 hp)
- Battery: 12 V lead-acid
- Range: 20 miles (32 km)

Dimensions
- Wheelbase: 1,304 mm (51.3 in)
- Length: 1,744 mm (68.7 in)
- Width: 744 mm (29.3 in)
- Height: 795 mm (31.3 in)
- Kerb weight: 30 kg (66 lb) without battery, approx. 45 kg (99 lb) with battery

The Sinclair C5 is a small battery electric one-person recumbent tricycle, technically an "electrically assisted pedal cycle". It was the culmination of the English entrepreneur Clive Sinclair's long-running interest in electric vehicles. Although widely described as an "electric car", Sinclair characterised it as a "vehicle, not a car".

Sinclair had become one of the UK's best-known millionaires, and earned a knighthood, for his successful Sinclair Research range of home computers in the early 1980s. He hoped to repeat his success in the electric vehicle market, which he thought had potential for a new approach. The C5 emerged from an earlier project to produce a small electric car called the C1. After a change in the law, prompted by lobbying from bicycle manufacturers, Sinclair developed the C5 as an electrically powered tricycle with a polypropylene body and a chassis designed by Lotus Cars. It was intended to be the first in a series of increasingly ambitious electric vehicles, but the development of the follow-up C10 and C15 models never progressed, mostly due to the poor public response to the C5.

On 10 January 1985, the C5 was unveiled at a launch event, but it was received unenthusiastically by the British media. Its sales prospects were blighted by poor reviews and safety concerns expressed by consumer and motoring organisations. The vehicle's limitations – a short range, a maximum speed of only 15 miles per hour (24 km/h), a battery that ran down quickly and a lack of weatherproofing – made it impractical for most people's needs. It was marketed as an alternative to cars and bicycles, but ended up appealing to neither group of owners, and it was not available in shops until several months after its launch. Within three months of the launch, production had been slashed by 90%. Sales never picked up despite Sinclair's optimistic forecasts and production ceased entirely by August 1985. Out of 14,000 C5s made, only 5,000 were sold before its manufacturer, Sinclair Vehicles, went into receivership.

The C5 has been described as "one of the great marketing bombs of postwar British industry" and a "notorious ... example of failure". The C5 went on to become a cult item for collectors. Thousands of unsold C5s were purchased by investors and sold for hugely inflated prices, as much as £6,000 compared to the original retail value of £399. Enthusiasts have established owners' clubs and some have modified their vehicles substantially, adding bigger wheels, jet engines, and high-powered electric motors to propel their C5s at speeds of up to 150 miles per hour (240 km/h).

== Design ==
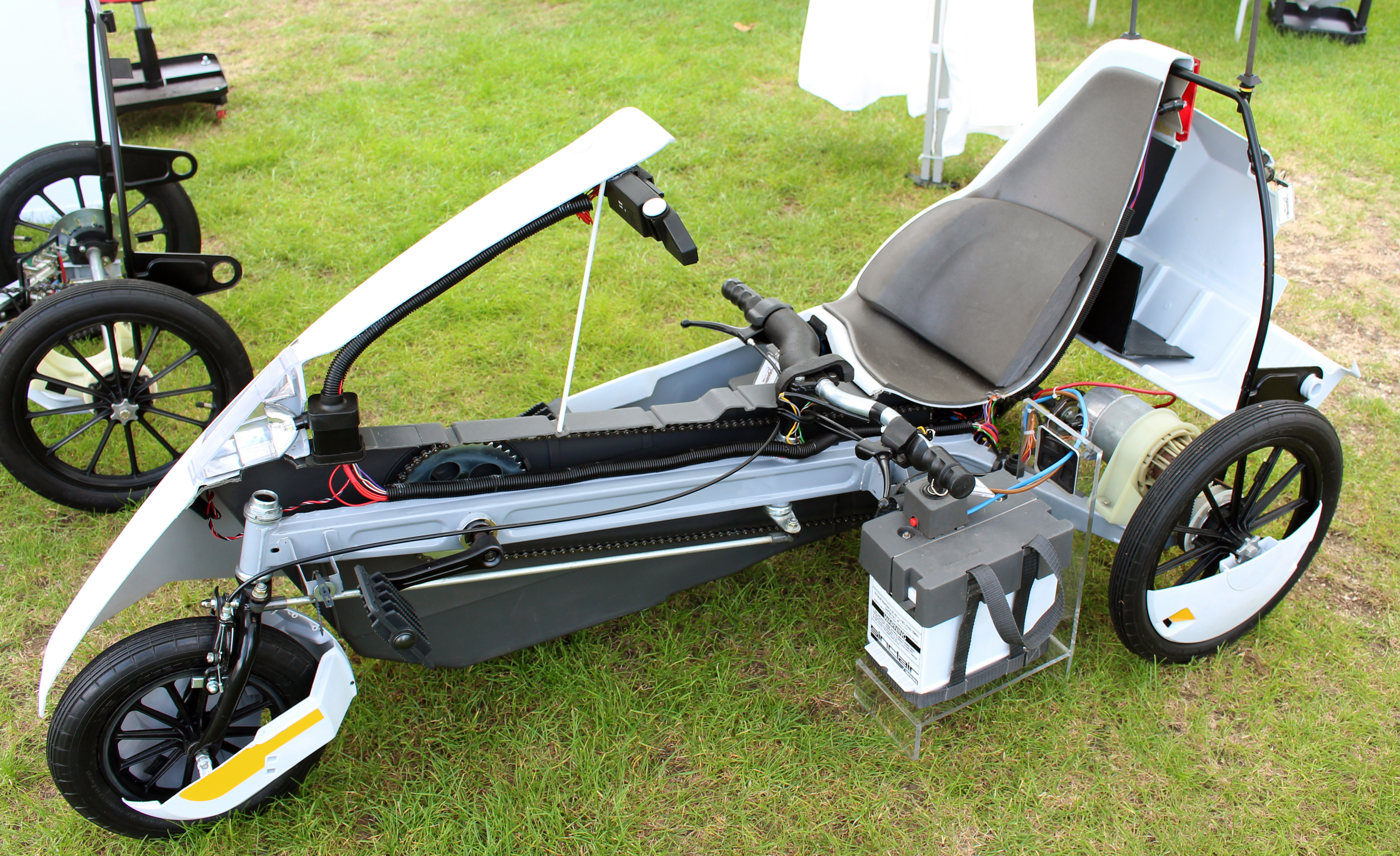
C5 with the left side of the body shell removed, showing the pedals, chassis, drive chain, battery, and electric motor

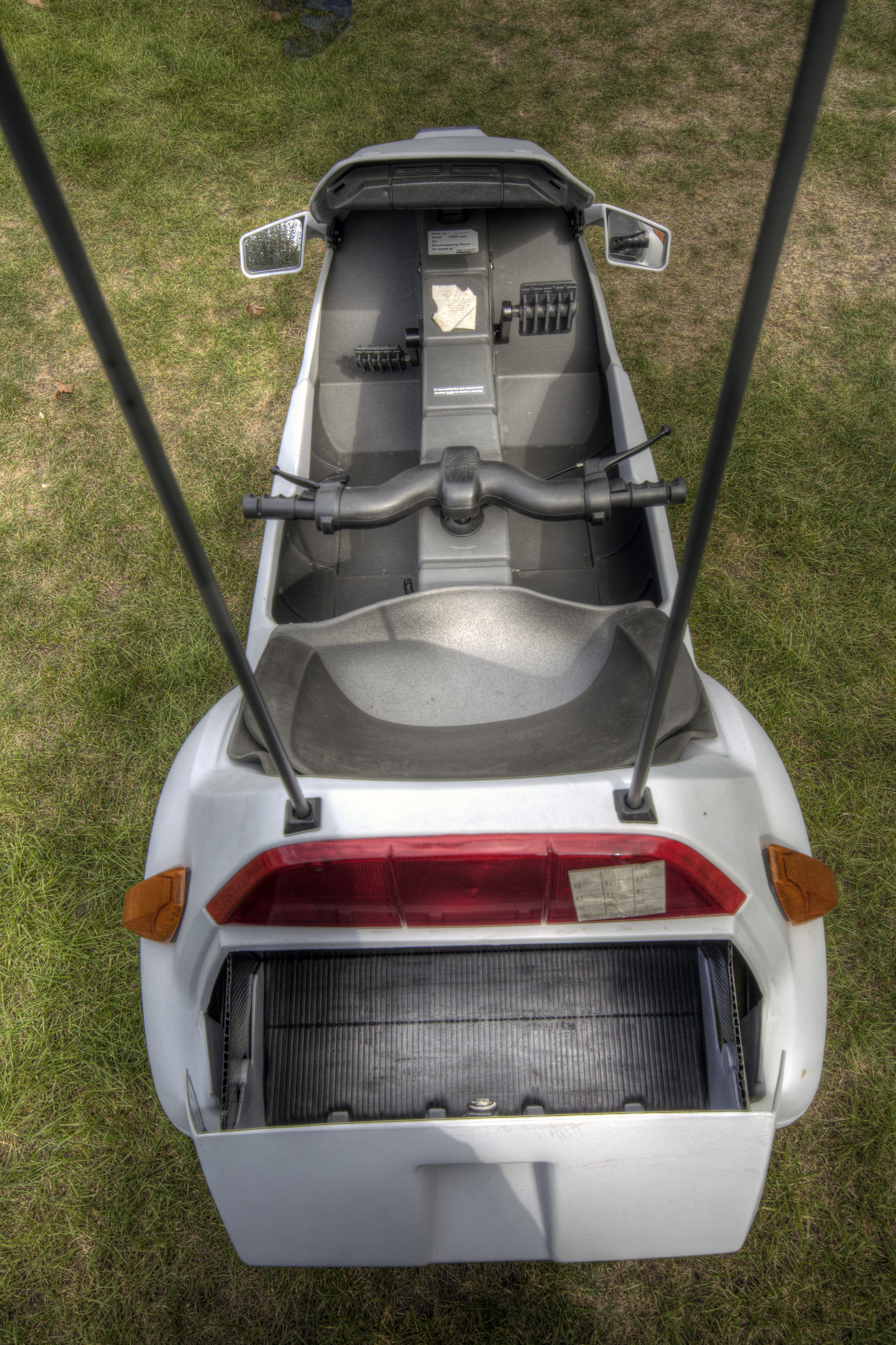
C5 seen from the rear, showing the driver's cockpit and the open luggage compartment at the rear

The C5 is made predominantly of polypropylene, measuring 174.4 cm (68.7 in) long, 74.4 cm (29.3 in) wide, and 79.5 cm (31.3 in) high. It weighs approximately 30 kg (66 lb) without a battery and 45 kg (99 lb) with one. The chassis consists of a single Y-shaped steel component with a cross-section of about 5.5 by 4 cm (2.2 by 1.6 in) The vehicle has three wheels, one of 317 mm (12.5 in) diameter at the front and two of 406 mm (16.0 in) at the rear.

The driver sits in a recumbent position in an open cockpit, steering via a handlebar that is located under the knees. A power switch and front and rear brake levers are positioned on the handlebar. As a supplement to or replacement for electric power, the C5 can also be propelled via bicycle-style pedals located at the front of the cockpit. The maximum speed of an unmodified C5 is 15 miles per hour (24 km/h). At the rear of the vehicle is a small luggage compartment with a capacity of 28 litres (1 cu ft). As the C5 does not have a reverse gear, reversing direction is done by getting out, picking up the front end and turning it around by hand.

The C5 is powered by a 12-volt lead–acid electric battery driving a motor with a continuous rating of 250 watts and a maximum 4,100 revolutions per minute. It is coupled with a two-stage gear-drive that increases torque by a factor of 13, without which the motor would not be able to move the vehicle when a person is on board. However, the motor is vulnerable to overheating. The torque increases as the load on the vehicle increases, for instance by going up too steep a gradient. Sinclair's tests showed that it could cope under power with a maximum slope of 1 in 12 (8%) and could manage a 1 in 7 (14%) slope using the pedals. As the speed of the motor reduces, the current flow through its windings increases, drawing up to 140 amps at stall speed. This would very quickly burn the motor out if sustained, so the motor's load is constantly monitored by the C5's electronics. If it stalls under full load the electronics disable the motor after 4 seconds, while if it is under heavy load (around 80 or 90 amps) it trips after two or three minutes. A heat-sensitive resistor inside the motor warns the driver if the vehicle is beginning to overheat and disconnects the motor after a short time, and a third line of defence is provided by a metallic strip mounted on the motor. If an excessive temperature is reached the strip distorts and the power is disconnected.

Although it was usually billed as an electric vehicle, the C5 also depends significantly on pedal power. The vehicle's battery is designed to provide 35 amps for an hour when fully charged or half that for two hours, giving the C5 a claimed range of 20 miles (32 km). A display in the cockpit uses green, amber, and red LEDs to display the state of the battery charge. The segments are extinguished one after the other to indicate how much driving time is left. The last light indicates that only ten minutes of power are left, after which the motor is switched off and the driver is left to rely on the pedals. Another display indicates via green, amber, and red LEDs how much current is being used. The C5 is in its most economical running mode when a low amount of current, indicated by the green LEDs, is being used. When the lights are red, the motor is under a high load and the driver needs to use pedal power to avoid overheating and shutdown.

The C5 was initially sold at a cost of £399, but to keep the cost under the £400 mark a number of components were sold as optional accessories. These included indicator lights, mirrors, mud flaps, a horn, and a "High-Vis Mast" consisting of a reflective strip on a pole, designed to make the C5 more visible in traffic. Sinclair's C5 accessories brochure noted that "the British climate isn't always ideal for wind-in-the-hair driving" and offered a range of waterproofs to keep C5 drivers dry in the vehicle's open cockpit. Other accessories included seat cushions and spare batteries.

== History ==
=== Origins ===
Sir Clive Sinclair's interest in the possibilities of electric vehicles originated in the late 1950s during a holiday job for the electronics company Solartron. Fifteen years later, in the early 1970s, he was the head of his own successful electronics company, Sinclair Radionics, based in St Ives in Cambridgeshire. He tasked one of his employees, Chris Curry – later a co-founder of Acorn Computers – to carry out some preliminary research into electric vehicle design.

Sinclair took the view that an electric vehicle needed to be designed from the ground up, completely rethinking the principles of automotive design rather than simply dropping electric components into an established model. He believed that the motor was the key to the design. Sinclair and Curry developed a wafer-thin motor that was mounted on a child's scooter, with a button on the handlebars to activate it. The research got no further, however, as Sinclair's development of the first "slimline" pocket calculator – the Sinclair Executive and its successors – took precedence. No further work on electric vehicles took place for most of the rest of the 1970s.

=== Early development: the C1 ===
It was not until late 1979 that Sinclair returned to electric vehicle development. Around Christmas that year, he approached Tony Wood Rogers, an ex-Radionics employee, to carry out consultancy work on "a preliminary investigation into a personal electric vehicle". The brief was to assess the options for producing a one-person vehicle which would be a replacement for a moped and would have a maximum speed of 30 miles per hour (48 km/h). Although Wood Rogers was initially reluctant, he was intrigued by the idea of an electric vehicle and agreed to help Sinclair. The vehicle was dubbed the C1 (the C standing for Clive). He built a number of prototypes to demonstrate various design principles and clarify the final specifications.

A specification of the C1 emerged by the end of the year. It would address short-distance transportation needs, with a minimum range of 30 miles (48 km) on a fully charged battery. This reflected official figures showing that the average daily car journey was only 13 miles (21 km), while the average moped or pedal cycle journey was just 6 miles (10 km). The users were envisaged as being housewives, urban commuters, and young people, who might otherwise use cycles or mopeds to travel. The electric vehicle would be safer, more weather-proof, and would offer space to carry items. It would be easy to drive and park and for the driver to enter or exit, and it would require minimum maintenance. The vehicle would be engineered for simplicity using injection-moulded plastic components and a polypropylene body. It would also be much cheaper than a car, costing £500 (equivalent to £1,500 in 2025) at the most.

One area of development that Sinclair purposely avoided was battery technology. Electric vehicles powered by lead–acid batteries had once actually outnumbered internal combustion engine vehicles; in 1912 nearly 34,000 electric cars were registered in the U.S. However, the efficiency of internal combustion engines greatly improved while battery technology advanced much more slowly, leading to petrol and diesel-driven vehicles dominating the market. By 1978, out of 17.6 million registered vehicles on Britain's roads, only 45,000 were electric vehicles in day-to-day use and of those, 90% were milkfloats. Sinclair chose to rely on existing lead–acid battery technology, avoiding the great expense of developing a more efficient type. His rationale was that if the electric vehicle market took off, battery manufacturers would step up to develop better batteries. Wood Rogers recalls:

We were stuck with the standard technology of the time. A car battery was out of the question because it couldn't stand constant charge/discharge cycles, a traction battery, similar to the kind used in milk floats, could be recharged from flat and a semi-traction battery, often used by caravanners, offered a good compromise. Sadly, though, we had very little freedom of choice.

The development programme moved to the University of Exeter in 1982, where the C1 chassis was fitted with fibreglass shells and tested in a wind tunnel. It was recognised at an early stage that the vehicle would have to be aerodynamic; although it was only ever intended to be small and relatively slow, reducing wind resistance was seen as essential for the vehicle's efficiency. By March 1982, the basic design of the C1 had been established. Sinclair then turned to an established motor design company, Ogle Design of Letchworth, to provide professional styling assistance and production engineering. However, Ogle's approach was not to Sinclair's liking; they tackled the project as one of car design and focused more (and expensively) on the aerodynamics rather than the cycle technology around which the C1 was based. The weight of the vehicle increased to over 150 kilograms (330 lb), far more than Sinclair's desired specification. By March 1983, Sinclair and Wood Rogers had decided to stop the C1 programme. Wood Rogers comments that Ogle were convinced that the C1 would be a flop, telling Sinclair that it would not be fast enough, that its drivers would get wet when it rained and that the battery was not good enough.

To meet the steadily escalating development costs of the vehicle, Sinclair decided to raise capital by selling some of his own shares in Sinclair Research to fund a separate company that would focus on electric vehicles. A £12 million deal was reached in March 1983, of which £8.3 million was used to fund the establishment of the new Sinclair Vehicles company. Sinclair recruited Barrie Wills, a veteran former employee of the DeLorean Motor Company, to lead Sinclair Vehicles as its managing director. Although Wills initially expressed scepticism about the viability of an electric vehicle – his twenty-five years in the motor industry had convinced him that an electric car was never going to happen – Sinclair managed to convince him that the project would work. In 1984, Sinclair Vehicles' new head office was established in Coventry in the West Midlands, an area with a long-established link with the motor industry.

The project's prospects were boosted by changes in the British government's approach to electric vehicles. In March 1980, it had abolished Vehicle Excise Duty for electric vehicles and by the start of 1983, the Department of Transport was working on legislation that would introduce a new category of vehicle – the "electrically assisted pedal cycle". This had a number of significant advantages from Sinclair's point of view. Such a vehicle would be exempt from insurance and vehicle tax, and the user would not need a driving licence or a helmet, all of which were required for mopeds. The legislation, which was passed in August 1983, was prompted by a lobbying campaign by manufacturers such as Raleigh who wanted to sell electric bicycles.

Sinclair realised that his electric vehicle design could easily be adapted to meet the new legislation. As the "electrically assisted pedal cycle" category was so new, there were no existing vehicles on the market that would meet the standards prescribed by the new legislation. However, it imposed a number of restrictions that limited the performance of any vehicle that would qualify under the new standards. The maximum legal speed of the vehicle would be limited to only 15 miles per hour (24 km/h); it could not weigh any more than 60 kilograms (130 lb), including the battery; and its motor could not be rated at any more than 250 watts.

Despite these limitations, the vehicle was seen as only the first step in a series of increasingly ambitious electrical cars. Sinclair intended it to prove the viability of electric personal transport; the hope was that, just as Sinclair had found with home computers like the hugely successful ZX81 and ZX Spectrum, an affordable electric vehicle could unleash pent-up demand for a market that did not previously exist. However, Sinclair performed no market research to ascertain whether there was actually a market for his electric vehicle; as the director of the Primary Contact advertising agency commented in January 1985, the project continued all the way to the prototype stage "purely on the convictions of Sir Clive".

=== Development and design ===
With Sinclair's new specifications in hand, Ogle worked on a three-wheeled design dubbed the C5, which bore similarities with the earlier three-wheeled Bond Bug – another Ogle design. The vehicle's handlebar steering was the brainchild of Wood Rogers, who decided at the outset that a steering wheel would not be practicable as it would make it impossible for a driver to get in and out easily – a serious safety disadvantage. He comments that "putting the bars at the driver's sides made it easy to steer and felt very natural". A prototype was presented to 63 families in the A, B, C1 and C2 demographic groups in suburban and town environments to determine that the controls were correctly positioned; this was the only external research carried out on the C5. In the autumn of 1983, Wills brought in Lotus Cars to finish the vehicle's detailing, build prototypes and test rigs, carry out testing and take forward the programme to production. The development of the C5 took place over 19 months in conditions of great secrecy, with testing carried out at the Motor Industry Research Association's proving ground in Leicestershire.

Further aerodynamic refinements were carried out in Exeter with the development of new body shells which produced further reductions in the vehicle's drag. However, it was felt that something was lacking in the design and a 23-year-old industrial designer, Gus Desbarats, was brought in to refine the shell's appearance. He had won a Sinclair-sponsored electric vehicle design competition at the Royal College of Art and was hired on his graduation to set up an in-house car design studio at Sinclair's Metalab in Cambridge, of which he became the first employee. It was not only Desbarats' first project but, as he later said, "day one of my working life", when he turned up at Sinclair's premises. He was taken aback when he saw the C5 for the first time, as he had been expecting a "proper" electric car. He said later that he thought "the concept looked futuristic but was short on practicality. There were no instruments, nowhere to put anything and no security features." Desbarats told Sinclair that the design would have to be redone from scratch, "asking what we were doing about visibility, rear view mirrors, range indications ...". It was far too late for this, however; all the key design decisions had already been made. Desbarats told Sinclair that he would need four months to revisit the design and was given eight weeks instead. He created the styling that was used for the final production model of the C5, with wheel trims and a small luggage compartment being added subsequently. Desbarats was also responsible for the creation of the High-Vis Mast accessory, as he felt uncomfortable being so close to the ground with other drivers potentially not being able to see him. He later described his contribution as "convert[ing] an ugly pointless device into a prettier, safer, and more usable pointless device".

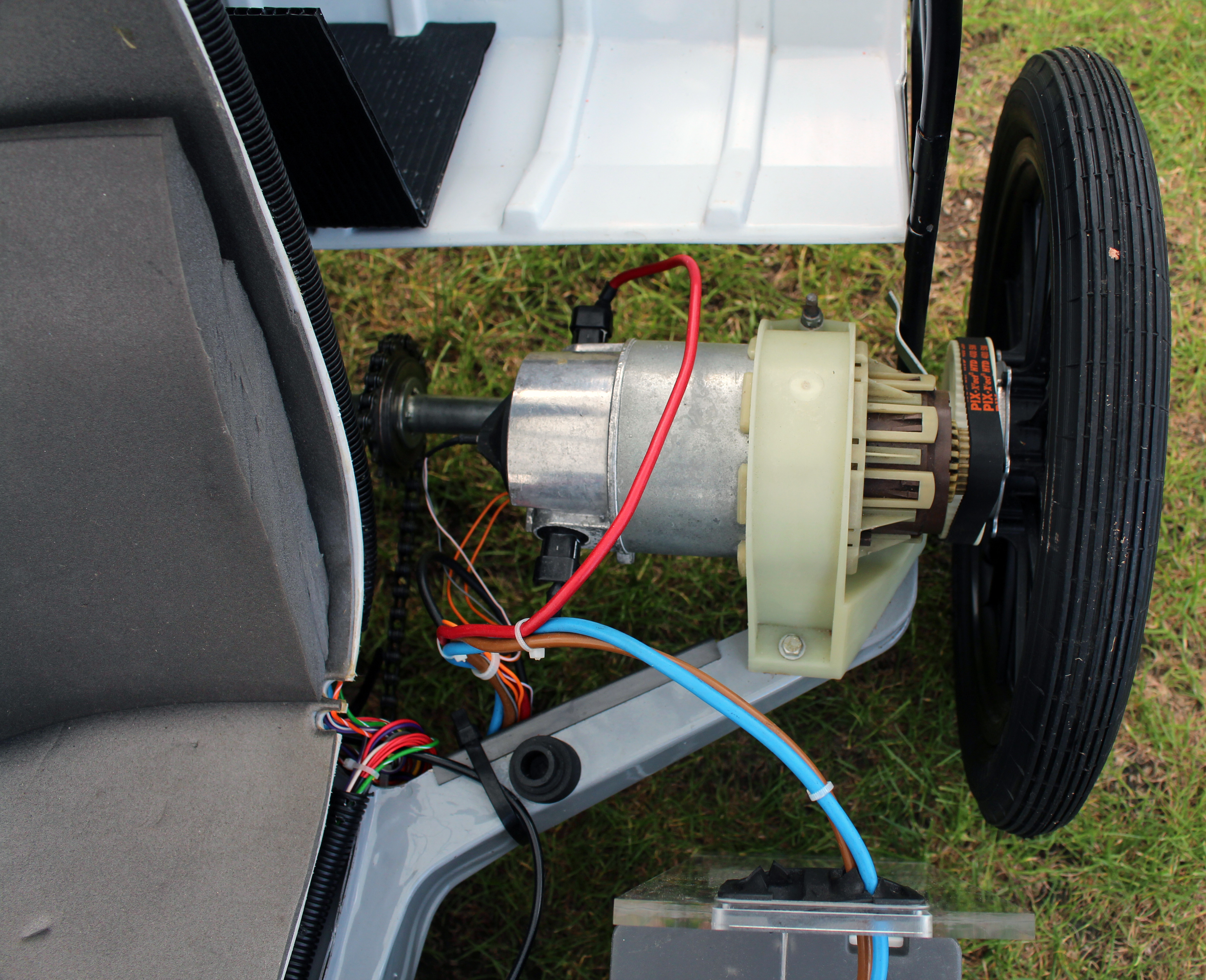
The C5's electric motor, which drives the left-hand rear wheel

The chassis of the C5 consists of two identical metal pressings which are joined at top and bottom with a closing plate at the rear. It lacks a separate suspension system, instead relying on the chassis structure having enough torsional flex. Its motor was produced in Italy by Polymotor, a subsidiary of the Dutch company Philips. Although it was later said that the C5 was powered by a washing machine motor, the motor was in fact developed from a design produced to drive a truck cooling fan. Lotus provided the gearbox and a rear axle based on a design for car steering columns. The C5's electronics were produced by MetaLab, a Sinclair spin-off. The wheels were assembled from tyres made in Taiwan and wheels from Italy. Oldham Batteries provided a lead–acid battery developed for Sinclair that could manage more than the 300 charge-discharge cycles that had originally been specified.

The bodywork was made from two injection-moulded polypropylene shells supplied by three manufacturers; J.J. Harvey of Manchester made the moulds, Linpac provided the shells, and ICI supplied the raw material. According to Rodney Dale, the upper shell mould was "one of the largest – if not the largest – injection mouldings of its type in the UK: possibly even in the world". The manufacturing process reflected Sinclair's ambition for the C5 production line. A single mould set was capable of producing up to 4,000 parts every week. The two parts of the shell were joined by wrapping a tape around the joint, aligning them on a jig, pressing them together and passing an electric current through the tape to heat and melt it. The same process was used to make the front and rear bumper assemblies of the Austin Maestro and only took about 70 seconds to complete. Although Sinclair had considered producing the C5 at the DeLorean plant at Dunmurry in Northern Ireland, which had one of Europe's most advanced automated plastic-body manufacturing facilities, this did not happen, as the DeLorean Motor Company failed in a controversial bankruptcy that resulted in the plant's closure.

Instead, the work of assembling the C5 was given to The Hoover Company in the spring of 1983. The Welsh Development Agency (WDA) approached Hoover to ask them if they would be interested becoming the principal subcontractor for Sinclair, "who are working on an electric car, and as a by-product of the research have designed an electrically assisted bicycle. They are looking for a subcontractor to whom they can entrust the assembly." The proposal suited all sides. The WDA was keen to support the Hoover washing machine factory at Merthyr Tydfil, situated in the economically depressed South Wales Valleys. Hoover was enticed by Sinclair's projections of sales of 200,000 units a year, increasing to 500,000. Sinclair saw Hoover's plant and expertise as a good match for their fabrication techniques. A contract was signed within a few months.

=== Production, distribution and support ===
The C5 was produced in great secrecy in a separate part of the Hoover factory with its own duplicate facilities. At first the work was carried out by a small team of people in a sealed room, but as production ramped up Hoover installed two production lines in building MP7, connected to the main factory by a tunnel. A rolling testing stand was located at the end of the production line to test each completed C5 for faults. A mechanical arm simulated the weight of a person weighing 12 stone (170 lb; 76 kg) and the vehicle's brakes were tested under load. At the end of the process the C5s which had passed testing were rolled into cardboard boxes and loaded straight onto distribution lorries in stacks. Around £100,000 was spent to set up the factory.

Distribution centres were set up in Hayes in Middlesex, Preston in Lancashire and Oxford to handle the C5s. Hoover arranged for 19 of its service offices around the UK – responsible for maintaining customers' vacuum cleaners and washing machines – to also maintain C5s and provide spare parts. The C5's major consumable item, the battery, was to be supported by 300 branches of Comet and Woolworths.

Hoover trained its engineers to produce C5s and tested its manufacturing processes by assembling, dismantling and re-assembling 100 C5s. Full production began in November 1984 and by early January 1985 over 2,500 C5s had been manufactured. Each production line could produce 50 vehicles an hour, and Hoover were capable of producing up to 8,000 C5s per week.

=== Launch ===
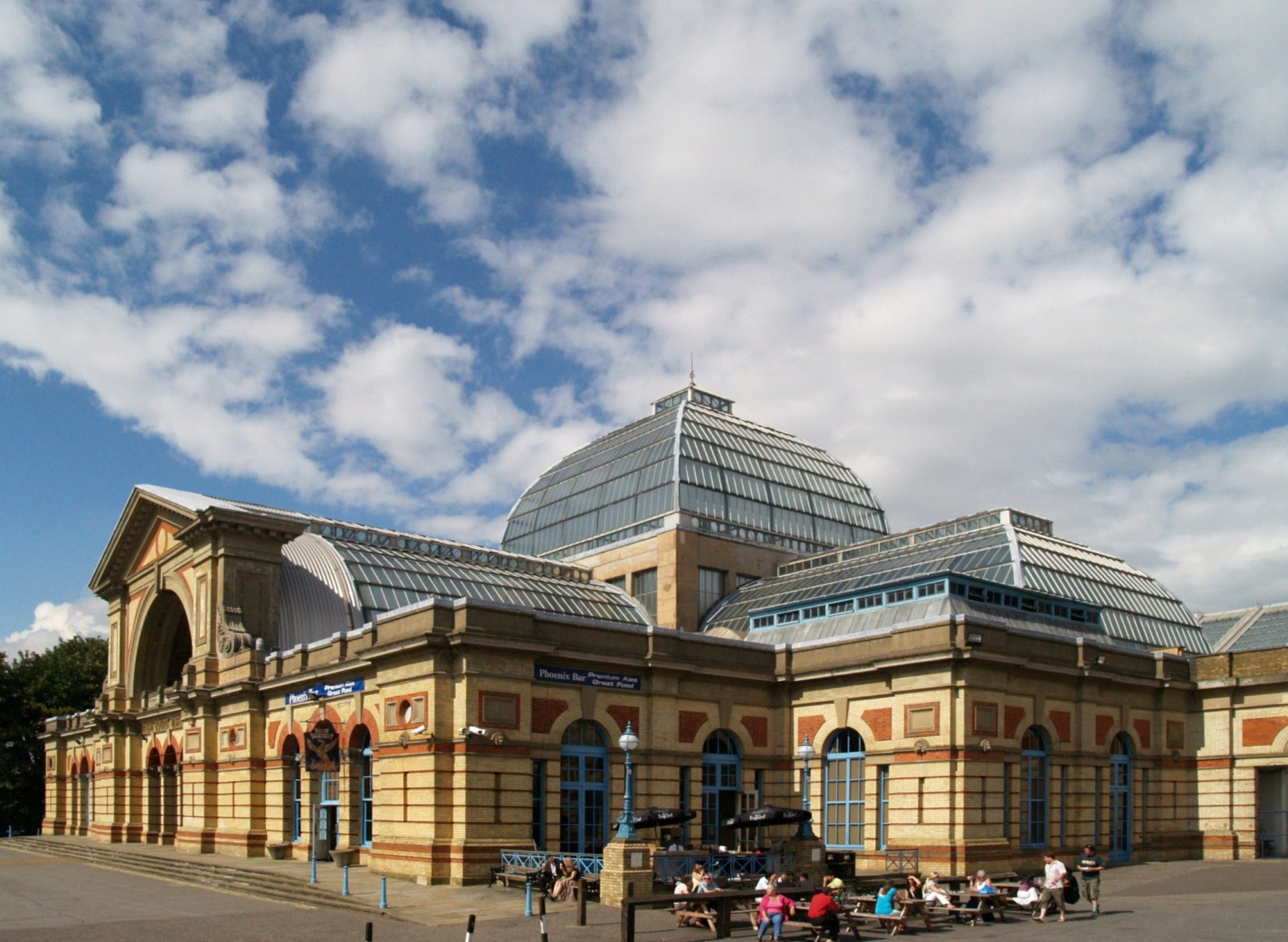
Alexandra Palace in London, where the C5's launch was staged on 10 January 1985

The news of Sinclair's C5 project came as a surprise when it became public and attracted considerable interest, as well as scepticism. The Economist reported in June 1983 that carmakers were "startled" but cautious about Sinclair's prospects; as one competitor put it, "If it were anyone but Sinclair, we'd say he was bonkers". The Economist asked, "Can a man who has made a fortune out of calculators and computers, and could double it on flatscreen televisions, be that crazy?" and wondered whether he was "making a ghastly mistake", a prediction that industry insiders thought was likely.

The C5 was launched on 10 January 1985 at Alexandra Palace in North London. The event was staged in Sinclair's usual glitzy style, with women handing out press packs and a variety of promotional giveaways: magazines, hats, pullovers, T-shirts, key rings, sun visors, badges, mugs, bags, and even a C5 video game. The vehicle was given a dramatic unveiling; six C5s driven by women dressed in grey and yellow burst out of six cardboard boxes, drove around the arena, and lined up side by side. Sinclair announced the launch of a £3 million, three-month-long advertising print and television advertising campaign. The C5 would be available initially by mail order at a cost of £399 and would subsequently be sold via high-street stores.

Sinclair issued a glossy sales brochure characterising the vehicle as a part of an ongoing exercise in "cutting giants down to size, turning impersonal tyrants into personal servants". The brochure highlighted Sinclair's achievements in producing affordable pocket calculators, home computers, and pocket televisions and declared, "with the C5, Sinclair Vehicles puts personal, private transport back where it belongs – in the hands of the individual." The photographs accompanying the text showed housewives and teenagers driving the C5 to shops, railway stations, and sports fields – in the words of technology writers Ian Adamson and Richard Kennedy, "a blue-sky suburbia exclusively populated by electric trikes and their drivers".

The press was given an opportunity to try out the C5 but this proved to be, as Adamson and Kennedy put it, "an unqualified disaster". A large number of the demonstration machines did not work, as the assembled journalists soon discovered. The Sunday Times called the C5 a "Formula One bath-chair"; its reporter "had travelled five yards outdoors when everything went phut and this motorised, plastic, lozenge rolled to a halt with all the stationary decisiveness of a mule". The Guardian's reporter had a flat battery after only seven minutes, while Your Computer found that the C5 could not cope with the slopes at Alexandra Palace: "The 250 watt electric motor which drives one of the back wheels proved incapable of powering the C5 up even the gentlest slopes without using pedal power. The tricycle was soon making a plaintive "peep, peep" noise signalling that the engine had overheated." Even the former racing driver Stirling Moss ran into problems when he tried out the C5 on the roads around Alexandra Palace. The Canadian newspaper The Globe and Mail reported that while he had started out well, "a jaunty smile on [his] face as he braved some of the worst exhaust fumes in the world spluttering almost directly into his face from trucks he could almost drive underneath", he ran into problems when he reached a hill: "It was at this point that he realised the battery had gone dead. On a cold and foggy London day, the great man was visibly sweating."

The timing and location of the launch event – in the middle of winter, on the top of a snow- and ice-covered hill – later prompted criticism even from Sinclair executives, who admitted off the record that spring conditions might have been better for a vehicle with so little protection from the British climate. The Financial Times called it "the worst possible timing to launch what was proclaimed to be a serious, road-going vehicle". Sinclair's biographer Rodney Dale describes it as "a calculated (or miscalculated) risk", observing that production was already underway, details were beginning to leak out to the press and "the launch could hardly have been held up until the possibility of a bright spring day". He justified the choice of January as being necessitated by a need to release the C5 "as soon as possible lest the erroneous speculation should have done more harm than good". Rob Gray offers an alternative explanation, that the launch date had been brought forward because Sinclair's development funds were running low.

=== Reviews ===
It soon became apparent that the C5 faced more serious problems with public perception than merely a botched launch event. Media reactions to the C5 were generally negative when the first reviews appeared over the following days. As the Financial Times observed, "the few hardy journalists who ventured out on the roads returned shivering and dubious about the C5's abilities in such harsh conditions."

A common concern was that it was simply too vulnerable in traffic. Your Computer commented that "a periscope would be handy if you intended driving the C5 on busy roads since your head is only at bonnet level." The Guardian's motoring correspondent wrote of her "grave misgivings about its use in congested traffic ... On a sharp turn it too easily lifts a rear wheel, is hazardously silent, and low down. It disappears below a car driver's sight-line when pulling up alongside. The prospect of these vehicles merging into heavy traffic, dwarfed by heavy lorries, buses, and cars, is worrying. Their low speed risks turning them into mobile chicanes for other traffic." Another Guardian writer wrote that he "would not want to drive [the] C5 in any traffic at all. My head was on a level with the top of a juggernaut's tyres, the exhaust fumes blasted into my face. Even with the minuscule front and rear lights on, I could not feel confident that a lorry driver so high above the ground would see me." Sinclair issued a publicity photograph showing the C5's industrial designer, Gus Desbarats, in a C5 alongside a cardboard cutout of an Austin Mini to illustrate that the C5 driver's seated position was actually higher than that of a Mini driver.

As teenagers were among the target audiences for the C5, some commentators also raised the prospect of (in Adamson and Kennedy's words) "packs of 14-year-olds terrorising the neighbourhood in their customised C5s". The secretary of the Cyclists Touring Club raised the prospect of "kids us[ing] them in a pretty wild way. They may run them over paths and pavements and knock people down." Sinclair dismissed such concerns – "I have qualms about seven-year-olds riding bicycles on the open road, but I have far fewer qualms about a 14-year-old driving one of these". Teenagers interviewed by The Guardian were doubtful about whether they would want a C5, commenting that while it was fun to drive they felt insecure in it and preferred their bicycles.

Sinclair's claims to have revolutionised the electric vehicle were dismissed by many reviewers; Your Computer called the C5 "more of a toy than the 'ideal solution for all types of local journey' which the brochure claims". The Guardian's motoring correspondent also characterised it as "a delightful toy". The Daily Telegraph described it as "a cleverly-designed 'fun' machine that can hardly be regarded as serious, everyday all-weather transport", while The Engineer viewed it as "a smashing big boy's toy, tough enough to take teenage thrashing and possibly a serious vehicle for fit adults to nip out in for the Sunday papers".

On the plus side, the C5's handling characteristics were praised by reviewers. The Guardian called it "very easy to master once you have become familiar with the under-thigh handlebar steering and the semi-recumbent driving position with feet on bicycle-type pedals." The Daily Mirror described the arrangement as "surprisingly easy" to master, although it cautioned that "on full speed and on full lock it's very easy to tip it onto two wheels." The Daily Express motoring correspondent wrote that he found the C5 "stable, comfortable and easy to handle".

The verdict from motoring organisations, road safety groups, and consumer watchdogs was decidedly negative and probably sealed the C5's fate. The British Safety Council (BSC) tested the C5 at Sinclair Vehicles' headquarters in Warwick and issued a highly critical report to its 32,000 members. Sinclair was furious and announced that he would sue the BSC and its chairman, James Tye, for defamation (although nothing came of it) after Tye told the press: "I am shattered that within a few days 14-year-old children will be allowed to drive on the road in this Doodle Bug without a licence ... without insurance and without any form of training." Several years later, Tye was happy to take responsibility for the C5's failure, describing himself as "the man entirely to blame for the failure of the Sinclair C5".

=== Sales history ===
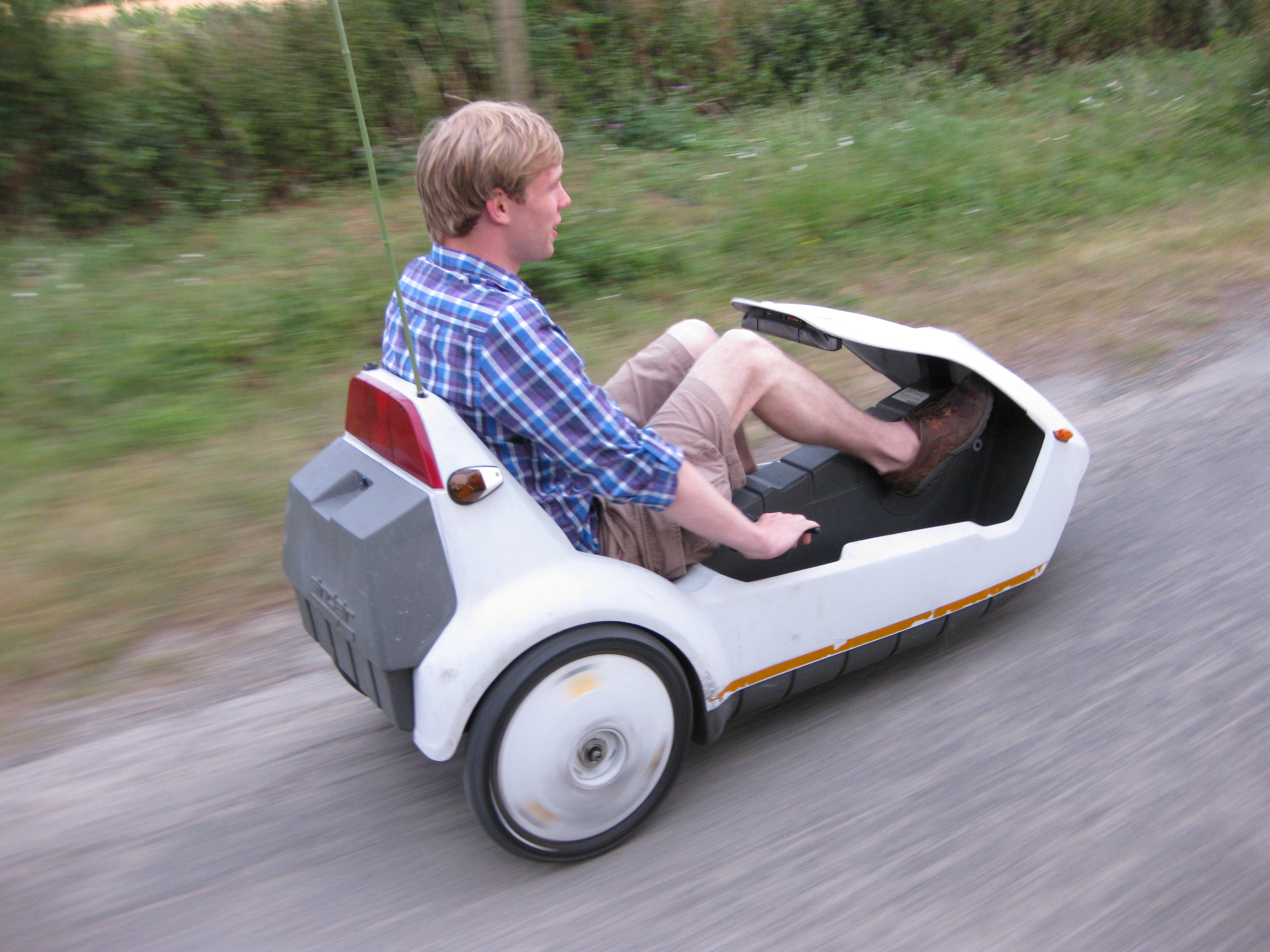
Driving a Sinclair C5

Despite the problems of the press launch day, a more positive response was expected from the 20,000 members of the public who attended the remaining two days of the launch event to try out the C5 on the Alexandra Palace test track. Sinclair reported the day after the event that its switchboard had been overwhelmed by enquirers, and it expected that all 2,700 units from the first production run would be sold by the following Monday. Setting a pattern that would be repeated throughout the C5's short commercial life, this prediction was wildly optimistic; fewer than 200 were sold during the Alexandra Palace event. However, sales picked up as mail order forms – which had been sent to all of Sinclair's computer customers – were returned with fresh orders. Within four weeks, 5,000 C5s had been sold.

The C5's users were an eclectic group. They included holiday camps who wanted C5s to rent to campers; the British Royal Family – Princes William and Harry each had one to drive around Kensington Palace before they were old enough to drive; Sir Elton John, who had two; the magician Paul Daniels, who bought a demonstration model he saw being driven around the BBC Television Centre car park; Sir Arthur C. Clarke, who had two shipped out to his home at Colombo in Sri Lanka; and the Mayor of Scarborough, Michael Pitts, who swapped his official Daimler for a C5. However, as The Times reported, some of the early buyers were disappointed by the vehicle's limitations, citing its slowness, its limited range and its inability to cope with steep hills, which led some people to return their C5s and ask for a refund.

Although the C5 reached retail stores at the start of March 1985, sales had tailed off. Sinclair resorted to hiring teams of teenagers to drive around London in C5s to promote the vehicle, at a cost to the company of £20 a day. Similar teams were established in Manchester, Birmingham, and Leeds. The company denied that it was a marketing campaign; a spokesman told The Times that "we haven't done ... tests on inner city roads. That is what the team is doing. Marketing is not the prime function but will undoubtedly be a spin-off." Sinclair was reported to be surprised at the lack of demand and blamed the press for "a lack of foresight and pessimistic reporting". Matters did not improve; three decades later, the C5's failure was attributed in Wallpaper to there being no market, insofar as "global warming hadn't been invented then". The retail chain Comet acquired 1,600 C5s but nine months later most were still unsold.

Adding to Sinclair's problems, production of the C5 had to be halted for three weeks after numerous customers reported that the plastic moulding attached to the gearbox was impairing the performance of their vehicles. 100 Hoover workers were shifted from the C5 production line to work on replacing the faulty mouldings on returned vehicles. Barrie Wills admitted that Sinclair was also taking the opportunity to "adjust stocks" in the light of the C5's poor sales. When production resumed a month later it was at only 10% of the previous level, with 90 of the workers being transferred back to the washing machine production lines. Only 100 C5s were now being produced a week, down from the original 1,000. Over 3,000 unsold C5s were piled up in storage at the Hoover factory, with additional unsold stock in 500 retail outlets nationwide.

Sinclair tried to put a brave face on it, admitting that "sales have not been entirely up to expectations" but claiming to be "confident of a high level of demand for the vehicle". A spokesman told the media that "we expect a rapid rise in sales now that the weather is improving". Possible sales opportunities were explored in mainland Europe, Asia, and the United States, with Sinclair claiming that he had found "very big" levels of interest. Hoover were sufficiently persuaded to allow Sinclair to divert 10 of their employees to modify C5s for overseas export. The bid to sell the C5 abroad failed; the Dutch National Transport Service told Sinclair that the C5 was not suitable for Dutch roads without improvements to its braking system, the addition of more reflectors, and the inclusion of the High-Vis Mast as part of the basic package. Most of the other ten countries that Sinclair inquired of demanded similar changes.

The C5's reputation received a further battering when major consumer organisations published sceptical evaluations. The Automobile Association questioned many of Sinclair's claims in a report published at the start of May. It found that the range of the vehicle was typically only about 10 miles (16 km) rather than the 20 miles (32 km) promised by Sinclair, and reported that the C5's battery ran flat after only 6.5 miles (10.5 km) on a cold day. The C5's running speed was more usually around 12.5 miles per hour (20.1 km/h) than the claimed 15 miles per hour (24 km/h), while its running costs compared unfavourably to that of a petrol-driven Honda PX50 moped. The stability, general roadworthiness, and especially the safety of the C5 were questioned, and the AA suggested that the High-Vis Mast should be included as part of the standard package. It concluded:

The C5 looks more comfortable and convenient than it really is – older cyclists looking for less pedal effort will be disappointed by the agility its layout demands. Although it is delightfully quiet, performance, range, and comfort do not compare with the better mopeds and costs are much closer than one might think when one allows for the inevitable battery replacement.

The Consumers' Association published a critical report on the C5 in the June issue of its magazine Which?, concluding that the vehicle was of only limited use and represented poor value for money. All three of the C5s that it tested broke down with a "major gearbox fault" and their High-Vis Masts snapped. The longest run between battery charges was only 14.2 miles (22.9 km), and a more realistic achievable range was 5–10 miles (8–16 km). It also echoed the AA's concerns about the C5's safety and the omission of the High-Vis Mast from the standard package. The magazine also called the C5 "too easy to steal", hardly surprising considering that while a security lock could be used to prevent it being driven away, the C5 was light enough that a would-be thief could simply pick it up and carry it off.

As the summer of 1985 continued, sales of the C5 remained far below Sinclair's predictions; only 8,000 had been sold by July. In the middle of that month, the Advertising Standards Authority ordered Sinclair to amend or withdraw its advertisements for the C5 after finding that the company's claims about the safety and speed of the C5 either could not be proved or were not justified. Retailers attempted to deal with unsold stocks of C5s by drastically cutting the vehicle's price. Comet first reduced the price to £259.90 but by the end of the year was selling C5s with a complete set of accessories for only £139.99, 65% less than the initial price.

Production was terminated in August 1985, by which time 14,000 C5s had been assembled. Cashflow problems caused by the paucity of sales caused relations to break down between Sinclair Vehicles and Hoover. In June 1985, Hoover obtained a writ against Sinclair for unpaid debts of over £1.5 million, relating to work carried out over the previous eight months. It did not actually serve the writ but entered negotiations with Sinclair. In mid-August, it publicly announced that it was ceasing production of the C5. A Sinclair spokesman told the media that the halt in production was "due to a shortage of certain components which are unable to be re-ordered while a financial settlement is pending. Once this has been concluded production is envisaged to recommence."

=== Demise of Sinclair Vehicles ===
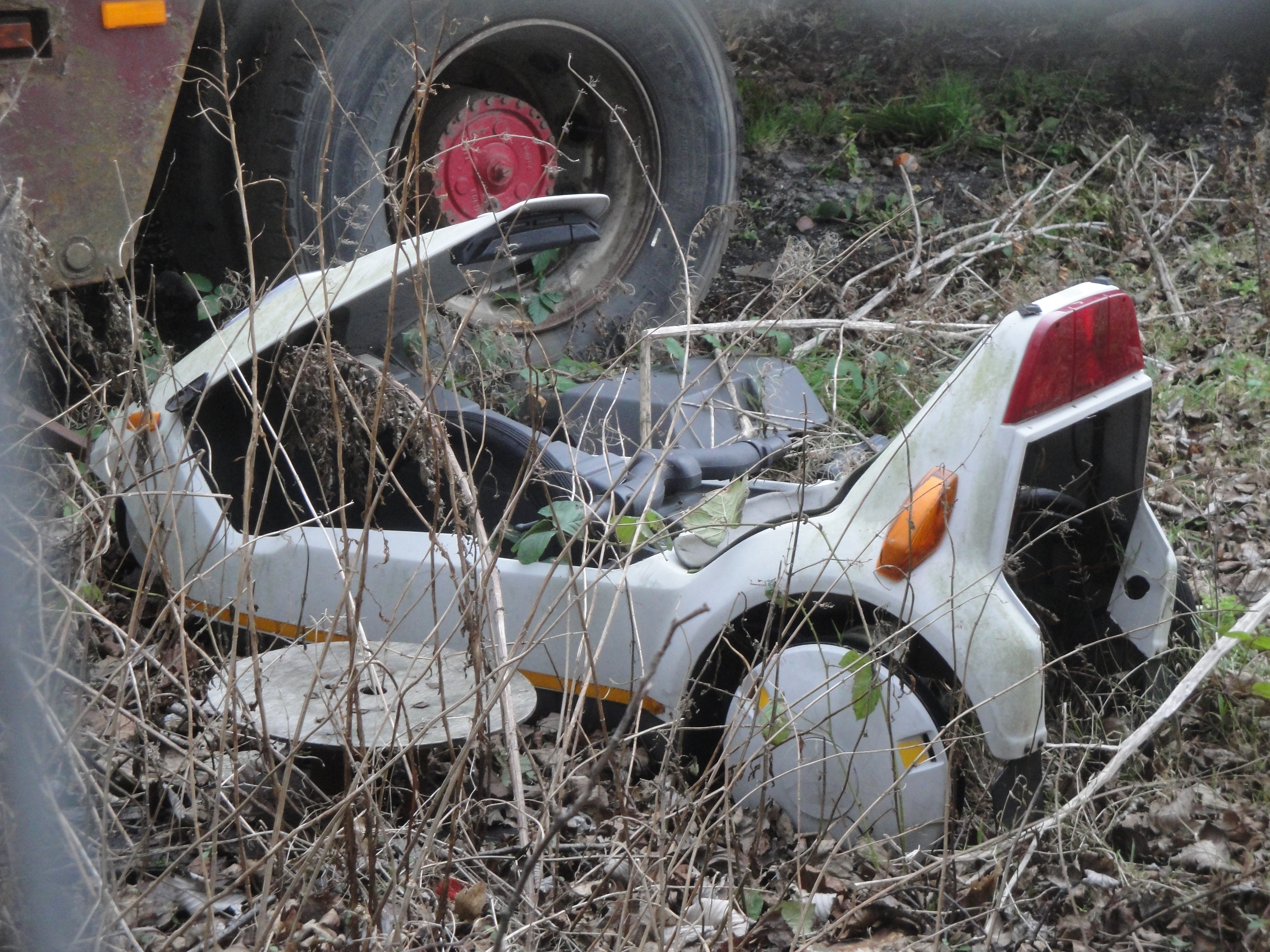
An abandoned Sinclair C5 in Fife, Scotland

Production did not recommence and the Hoover production line remained closed permanently. On 19 September 1985, Sinclair Vehicles changed its name to TPD Limited, with a direct subsidiary named Sinclair Vehicles Sales Limited continuing to sell C5s. TPD only lasted until 15 October, when it was placed into receivership. The receivers announced that 4,500 C5s had been sold by Sinclair Vehicles, with another 4,500 remaining in the company's hands. £7.75 million was reportedly owed to creditors, of which £7 million was owed to Sir Clive Sinclair himself in reflection of his personal investment in the project. Hoover was not among the creditors, as Sinclair had managed to settle the dispute on terms that neither company would reveal.

On 5 November, TPD was formally liquidated at a creditors' meeting. It was revealed, to the anger of the creditors, that Sinclair had taken out a £5 million debenture to cover the money that he had put into the company. Ordinary creditors faced little prospect of recovering the £1 million left outstanding. Primary Contact, the marketing agency used by Sinclair to promote the C5, was left with the biggest unpaid bill, of nearly £500,000. The last of the unsold C5s were bought for £75 each by Ellar (Surplus Goods) Ltd of Liverpool, which planned to sell 1,000 of them to an Egyptian businessman for use on a university campus while another 1,500 were intended to be sold in the UK.

Many reasons have been suggested for the failure of Sinclair Vehicles and what Dale calls "the jigsaw of the C5's disappointment". One of the receivers of Sinclair Vehicles, John Sapte, suggested that Sinclair had taken the wrong tack with its marketing of the C5: "It was presented as a serious transport, when perhaps it should have been presented as a luxury product, an up-market plaything." Ellar's director Maurice Levensohn took exactly this tack when he purchased Sinclair Vehicles' remaining stock, saying that his company would market them as "a sophisticated toy": "If you were a little boy, wouldn't you want your parents to get you one this Christmas?" His strategy was successful; Ellar sold nearly 7,000 C5s at up to £700 each, far more (and at a higher price) than Sinclair had ever managed.

Some commentators attributed the C5's failure to problems with Sinclair's marketing strategy; only a year after the demise of Sinclair Vehicles, the Globe and Mail newspaper called it "one of the great marketing bombs of postwar British industry". Andrew P. Marks of Paisley College of Technology criticised Sinclair's marketing strategy as confused; the C5 promotional brochure depicts it as a leisure vehicle, showing boys in C5s at a football pitch, women in C5s on a suburban road, and so on, while the text suggests that the C5 is a serious substitute for a car. He concludes that the C5 was poorly defined, appearing to be "trying to grasp at two different markets" but was unable to appeal to either, and so failed to take off. The fact that it was initially only available via mail order was also a mistake, in Marks' view, as it meant that no physical inspection of the product could be made before purchasing it. This was a serious deterrent to consumers as it made the C5 a much more risky purchase.

The design researcher and academic Nigel Cross calls the C5 a "notorious ... example of failure" and describes its basic concept as "wrong". He said the marketing research for the C5 was carried out after the vehicle's concept had already been decided, observing that it appears to have been intended "mainly to aid promotion" rather than to guide development. Gus Desbarats, the C5's industrial designer, attributes the vehicle's flawed concept to Sinclair operating in a "bubble" and believes that Sinclair "failed to understand the difference between a new market, computing, and a mature one, transport, where there were more benchmarks to compare against". He comments that the experience of working on the C5 convinced him of the need for industrial designers such as himself to get "involved early in the innovation process, shaping basic configurations, never again [being] satisfied to simply decorate a fundamentally bad idea".

Sinclair himself said in 2005 that the C5 "was early for what it was. People reacted negatively and the press didn't help. It was too low down and people felt insecure, hence it got bad press." Sam Dawson of Classic and Sport Car Magazine described the C5 as "incredibly fun to drive", suggesting that the safety concerns "could have been addressed if it wasn't for the fact that it was already doomed as a national joke." He noted the disconnect between the media's expectations of a serious electric car and the reality of the C5, which he called "just a fun way of getting around". Professor Stuart Cole of the University of South Wales comments that the C5 suffered from the design of the roads and the attitudes of the time, which were not geared towards pedal or electric vehicles: "In the days before unleaded petrol, your face would have been at the height of every exhaust pipe, and drivers weren't used to having to consider slower-moving cyclists. But with more cycle lanes, better education, and workplaces providing showers, etc., the world now is much more geared up for people looking for alternatives to the car, and hopefully will become even more so in the future."

== Legacy ==
=== Sinclair's other electric vehicles ===
Sinclair envisaged producing follow-up vehicles such as the C10, a two-seater city car, and the C15, a three-seater capable of travelling at 80 miles per hour (130 km/h). As Wills put it at the launch event, "We're developing a family of traffic-compatible, quiet, economic and pollution-free vehicles for the end of the '80s." The C5 was described as "the baby of the family". The C10 was intended to be a city car, capable of carrying two passengers at up to 40 miles per hour (64 km/h) in a roofed but open-sided compartment with two wheels at the front and one at the back. Wood Rogers intended it to effectively be an updated version of the Isetta, a 1960s Italian microcar. Sinclair built a full-scale mock-up of it; according to Wood Rogers, "it looked great. I specified open sides to keep the cost down and having no doors meant it escaped a lot of regulations too." The design is strikingly similar to the modern Renault Twizy electric vehicle; Wood Rogers comments that "you could put the C10 into production today and it would still look contemporary."

At the time of the C5's launch, Sinclair described the C15 as having "a futuristic design with an elongated 'tear-drop' shape, a lightweight body made of self-coloured polypropylene and a single, possibly 'roller' type rear wheel". It would have been launched at the 1988 International Motor Show in Birmingham following a development programme costed at £2 million. Unlike the relatively conventional technology used in the C5, Sinclair intended to use sodium sulphur batteries with four times the power-to-weight ratio of lead–acid batteries to give the C15 much greater speed and range – over 180 miles (290 km) on a single charge. It would have had approximately the same dimensions as a conventional small car, measuring 3.5 metres (11 ft) long, 1.35 metres (4 ft 5 in) high, and 1.35 metres (4 ft 5 in) wide. However, it could only have worked if sodium sulphur batteries had realised their promise. In the event they did not, the project could not continue, due to thermal problems. Neither the C10 nor the C15 ever left the drawing board.

Although Sinclair went on to produce more (but much smaller) electric vehicles (including the Sinclair Zike in 1992) the C5 debacle did lasting damage to the reputation of subsequent EVs in the UK, which the media routinely compared to the C5. It was not until a highly regarded manufacturer, Toyota, launched a serious and well-received vehicle in the 1990s, the Prius, that the C5 "jinx" was finally laid to rest.

In 2017 Sir Clive's nephew Grant Sinclair presented what he called an updated version of the Sinclair C5 called the Iris eTrike.

=== Cult following ===
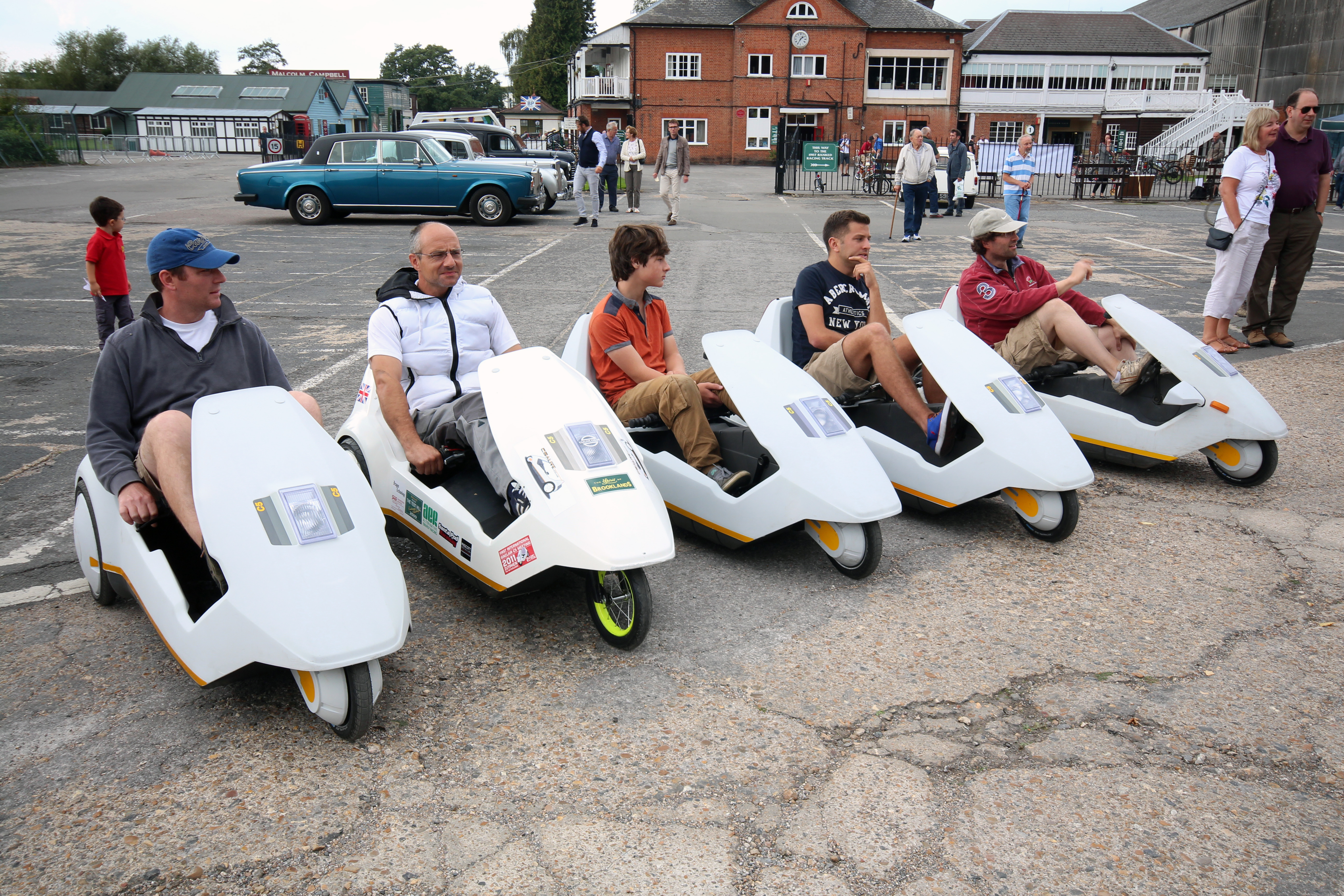
C5 enthusiasts gather at the Brooklands Museum in Surrey

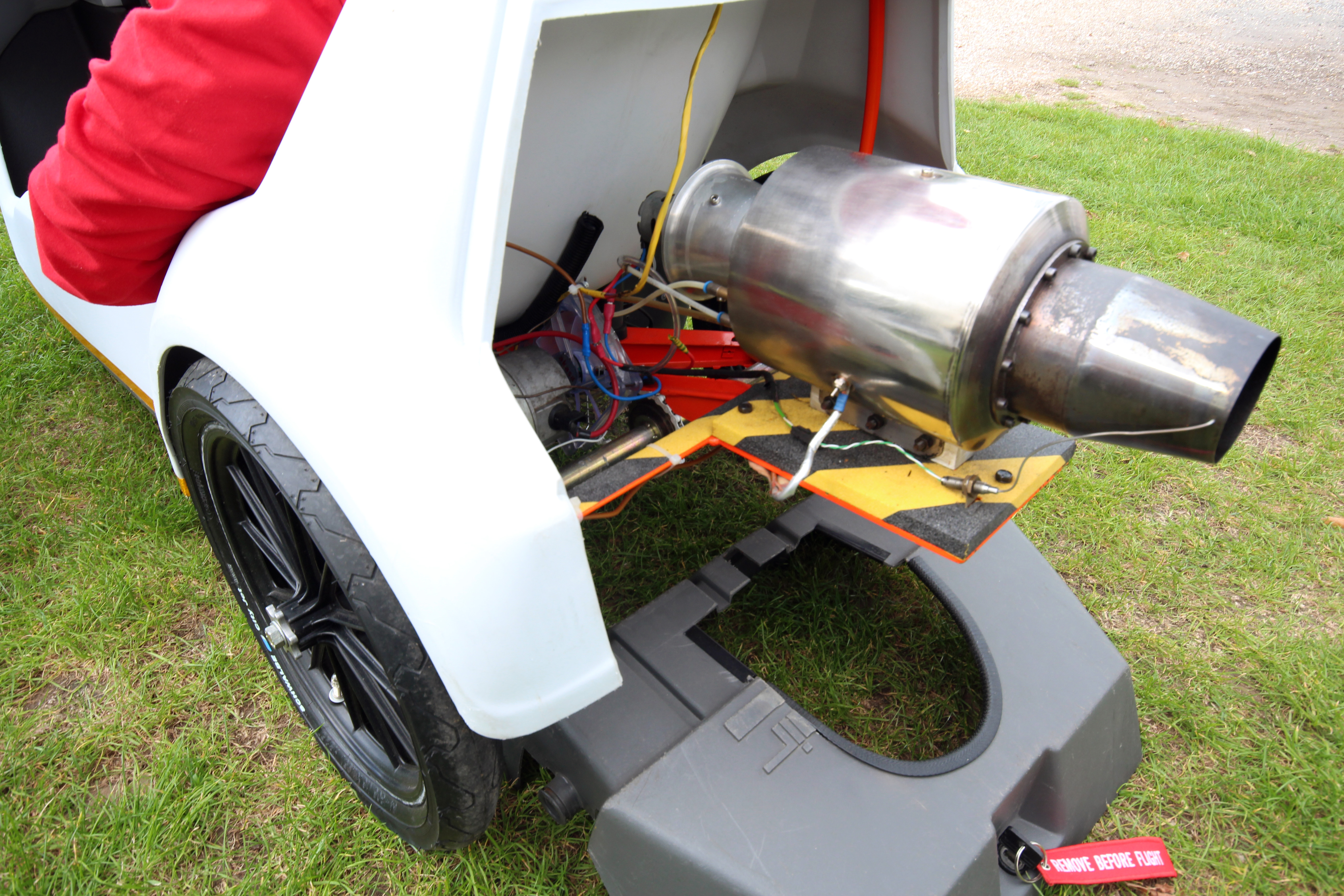
A heavily modified C5 fitted with a jet engine

The C5 gained an unexpected cult following. Collectors began purchasing them as investment items, reselling them for considerably more than their original retail price. One such investor, Adam Harper, bought 600 C5s from a film company as a speculative investment in 1987. He sold all but four within two years, selling them to customers who wanted a novel or more environmentally friendly form of transportation. He also found willing customers among drivers who had been banned from the road, as the C5 did not need a driving licence or vehicle tax. According to Harper, C5s could be resold for as much as £2,500 – more than six times the original retail price. By 1996, a Special Edition C5 in its original box was reported to be worth more than £5,000 to collectors.

C5 owners began modifying their vehicles to achieve levels of performance far beyond anything envisaged by Sinclair. Adam Harper used one C5 as a stunt vehicle, driving it through a 70 ft (21 m) tunnel of fire, and adapted another to run at 150 miles per hour (240 km/h), aiming to break a world land speed record for a three-wheeled electric vehicle and the British record for any type of electric vehicle. He said later: "Up to 100 mph [160 km/h] it's like you're running on rails, it's really stable. Then at about 110 to 120 mph [180–195 km/h] it starts getting tricky. At that point if a tire blew up or something happened you would be surely dead."

As quoted in the 1987 Guinness Book of Records under battery powered vehicle: "John W. Owen and Roy Harvey travelled 919 miles (1479 km) from John O'Groats to Land's End in a Sinclair C5 in 103 hr 15 min on 30 Apr-4 May 1985" (8.9 mph/14.3 km/h average).

Chris Crosskey, an engineer from Abingdon, set a record for the longest journey completed on a C5 on a trip to Glastonbury – 103 miles (166 km) away ("I nearly died of exhaustion") – and tried three times to drive one from Land's End to John o' Groats, a distance of 874 miles (1,407 km). Another engineer, Adrian Bennett, fitted a jet engine to his C5, while plumber and inventor Colin Furze turned one into a 5-foot-high (1.5 m) "monster trike" with 2 feet (0.6 m) wheels and a petrol engine capable of propelling it at 40 miles per hour (64 km/h).

The singer John Otway has used a C5 in his stage show and publicity.

== See also ==
- eROCKIT
- List of motorized trikes
- Velomobile
