= Sinclair Vehicles =

British electric vehicle company (1983–1985)

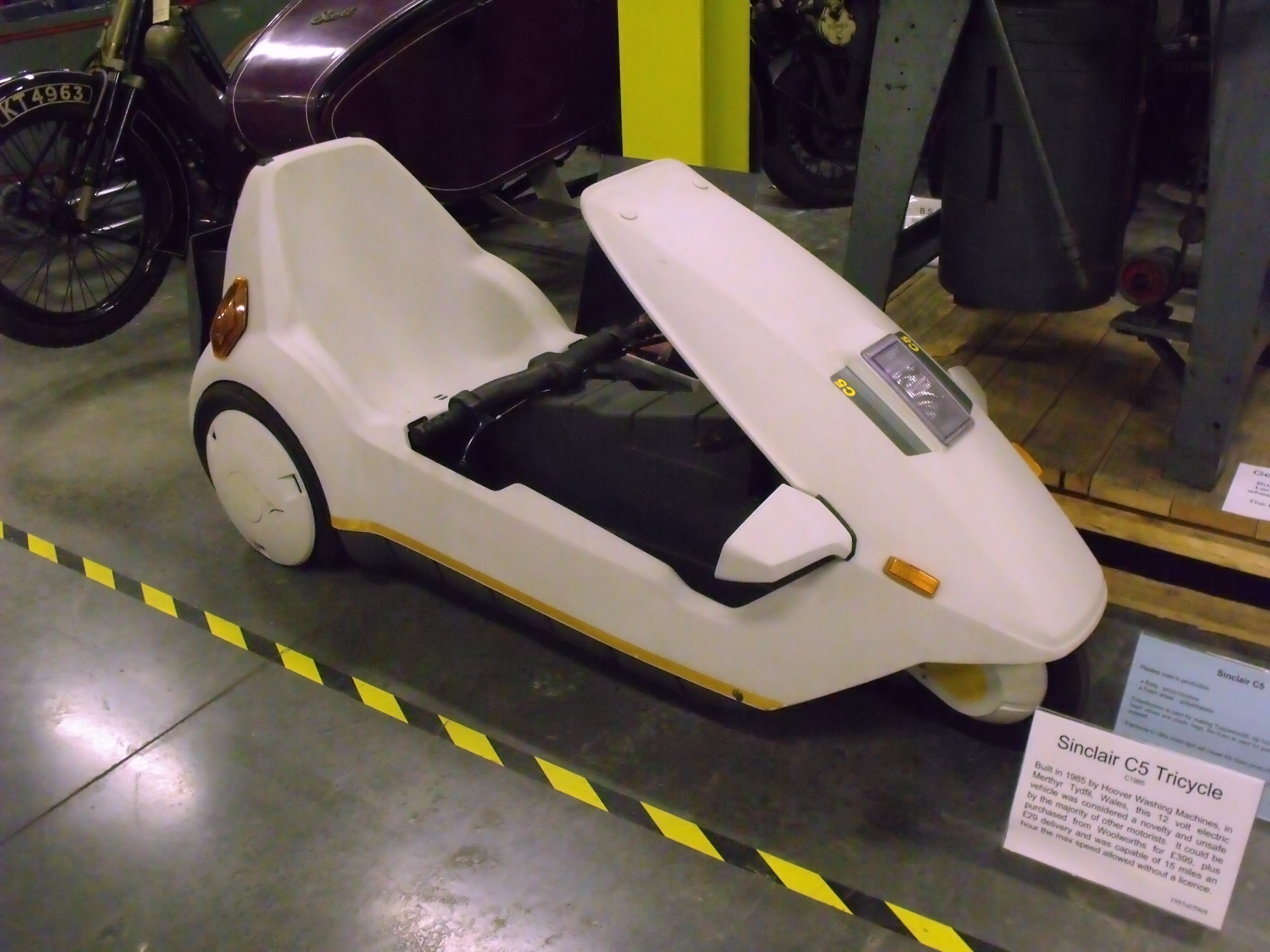
Sinclair C5

Sinclair Vehicles Ltd was a company formed in March 1983 by Sir Clive Sinclair as a focus for his work in the field of electric vehicles. The initial investment was £8.6m, which came from the proceeds of the sale of some of Sir Clive's shares in Sinclair Research. Barrie Wills, formerly of the DeLorean Motor Company, was appointed managing director.

The first (and only) Sinclair Vehicles production model was the single-seater Sinclair C5, launched on 10 January 1985. Larger models were planned, including the C15, a four-seater car capable of speeds of up to 80 mph (130 km/h). The generally poor reception given to the C5 by the press and public meant that these models would never reach production.

In August 1985, Hoover, the manufacturer of the C5, announced that production would be stopped due to a financial dispute with Sinclair Vehicles. The following month, Sinclair Vehicles was renamed TPD Ltd. On 15 October 1985, it was announced that TPD were in receivership and the company entered voluntary liquidation on 4 November 1985.

== See also ==
- List of car manufacturers of the United Kingdom
