= A2B =

A2B may refer to:

- A_{2B}, Adenosine A2B receptor
- A2B Australia, a taxi operator
- A2B Bicycles, an electric bicycle company
- Adyar Ananda Bhavan, a chain of restaurants and confectioners in India
- Automotive Audio Bus, a serial data bus standard for vehicles
