= Powabyke =

Electric Bicycle Importer

- Industry: Importer of Vehicles
- Founded: 1999; 26 years ago
- Headquarters: Temple Cloud, Bristol, United Kingdom
- Key people: Frank Curran; Keith Palmer
- Website: www.powabyke.com

Powabyke is a British importer of electric bicycles. Founded in 1999, the company was selling over 1,500 bikes per year by 2005 through a network of around 300 dealers including bike shops and motor accessory retailers. It has also branched out into golf carts.

Powabyke bikes and trikes are driven by a hub-mounted electric motor in the front or rear wheel, powered by a removable rechargeable battery. The environmental impact of the battery is minimised through offering a refurbishment scheme.

Powabyke supports Park & Charge, who are launching an initiative to offer "park and charge" facilities for electric vehicles across the UK.

In August 2013 Powabyke was taken over by long term employees Frank Curran and Keith Palmer. They straight away set about improving the specifications of the Xbykes by increasing the battery capacity to a 10amp pack as well as tidying up and improving the electrics which brought about the introduction of the MK3 range of XBykes complete with brushless motor. Powabyke added more products to its range with the conv-e conversion kit (allowing a regular push bike to be converted to electric), as well as the reintroduction of the newly updated Powatryke with brushless motor and Lithium battery as standard. In September 2014 Powabyke launched the Xplorer, a full suspension, 26" wheel folding electric mountain bike.
