= A2B (brand) =

Electric bicycle brand

A2B Bicycles
- Parent: Hero Eco

A2B is a brand of electric bicycles owned by Hero Eco Group. They have offices in the United Kingdom and the United States. Established in 2008, A2B designs and manufactures bespoke internal motor systems, and is a creator of eBikes. Their German design team has developed a range of 11 electric bike models. Primarily for urban/commuting users, their motors range from 250w up to 500w in capacities.

== History ==
Established in 2008, A2B designs and manufactures bespoke internal motor systems for eBikes. The German design team has produced 11 electric bike models. The bikes are primarily tailored to riders of urban and commuting purposes. The eBike models have two power options, Pedal Assist and Throttle Assist, with motors of different levels of 250w, 350w, and 500w available.

The company is owned by Indian manufacturer Hero Eco, which acquired the British manufacturer of A2B electric bikes, Ultra Motor Ltd., in 2011 after it filed for Administration in the UK.

The A2B company launched the Metro model in 2009, the first specially designed bike frame for electric motors. It was reviewed by Wired. In 2013, Hero Eco rebranded as A2B. The brand remained owned by Hero Eco Group.

In 2013, it released the electric bikes Kuo and Shima.

Hero Electric in 2018 released the e-bicycles A2B Speed and Kuo Boost.

In 2012, Hero Eco acquired the two-wheeler division of Ultra Motor. In 2013, A2B bikes were manufactured in Taiwan, and manufacturing moved to Europe in 2014 and 2015.

Between 2012 and 2013, Hero Eco sold around 9,000 units of A2B bike in 22 countries.

In 2014 A2B acquired the Electric Bicycle Network, an eBike rental company for tourists visiting UK national parks.

== Models ==
A2B replaced the metro with the upgraded version now called the Octave. The Alva Plus is a lighter, sportier version. The Shima has speeds up to 28 mph. The lightest ebikes are the Ferber, Galvani, and the folding Kuo Plus.

In 2009, it released the Ultramotor A2B electric bicycle.

In February 2018, Hero Electric launched in India a new faster, range. This comprised an e-scooter codenamed the AXLHE-20, and two e-bicycles, the A2B Speed and Kuo Boost. The AXLHE-20 claims a top speed of 85 km/h along with a maximum range of 110 kilometres on one charge. The A2B Speed, that can be ridden both using electric or pedal power, has a maximum speed of 45 km/h.

== See also ==
- Outline of cycling
- List of electric bicycle brands and manufacturers
