= GeoOrbital =

Electric wheel system

GeoOrbital, Inc.
- Type: Privately held company
- Industry: Electric bicycles
- Founded: 2014
- Founder: Michael Burtov
- Number of locations: Cambridge, Massachusetts
- Products: Electric wheel system
- Website: www.geoorbital.com

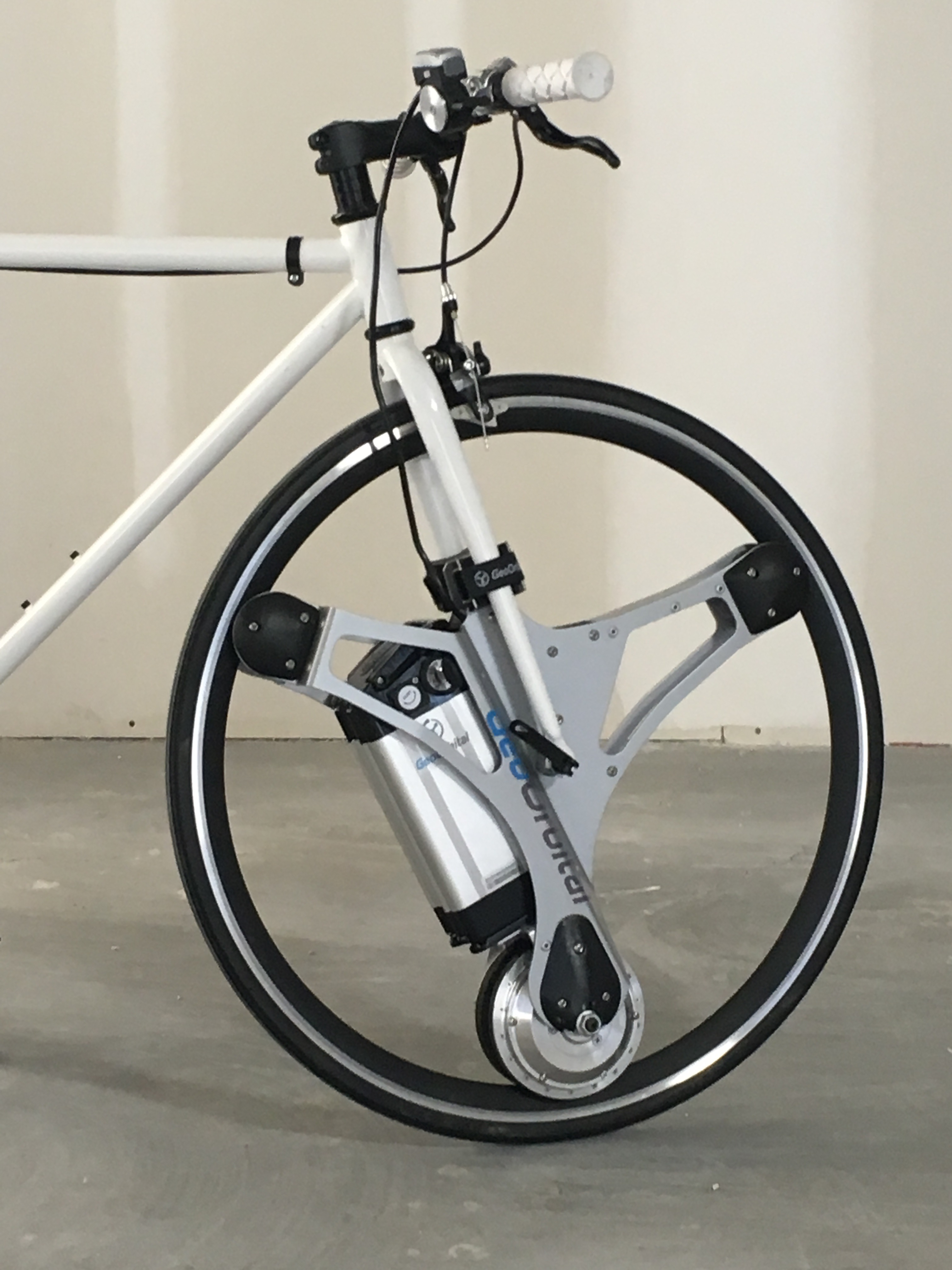
GeoOrbital wheel

GeoOrbital is an electric wheel system fitted to existing bicycles by the American company GeoOrbital, Inc. It launched its successful crowdfunding campaign in 2016. A GeoOrbital powered bike was featured during TechCrunch Disrupt NY 2016 at Brooklyn, NY in May 2016. In May 2017 it launched a Crowdfunding Reg CF campaign on the site StartEngine

== History ==
GeoOrbital was founded by Michael Burtov in 2014. Burtov conceived the concept while watching a film called Tron, thinking that a lot of space was wasted inside the wheels - leading him to create an electric wheel system. He designed a wheel that can take the place of the existing wheel on nearly any bike, with two size options at launch. The motor and battery were able to produce a top speed of 20 mph and battery lasts for 12 miles, extendable to 30 miles with pedaling. In 2016, the company debuted on Kickstarter, reaching its fundraising goal of 75,000 within 78 minutes. With the fundraising campaign, the company drew the attention of media and was covered in TechCrunch, Irish Times, Huffington Post, The Verge, Gadgette and others.

The company also successfully raised a funding around of $150,000 from a group of independent angel investors.

The successful kickstarter campaign in May and June 2016 generated $1,261,222 in pledges pre purchasing around 1600 wheels. [14]
