= EROCKIT =

eROCKIT
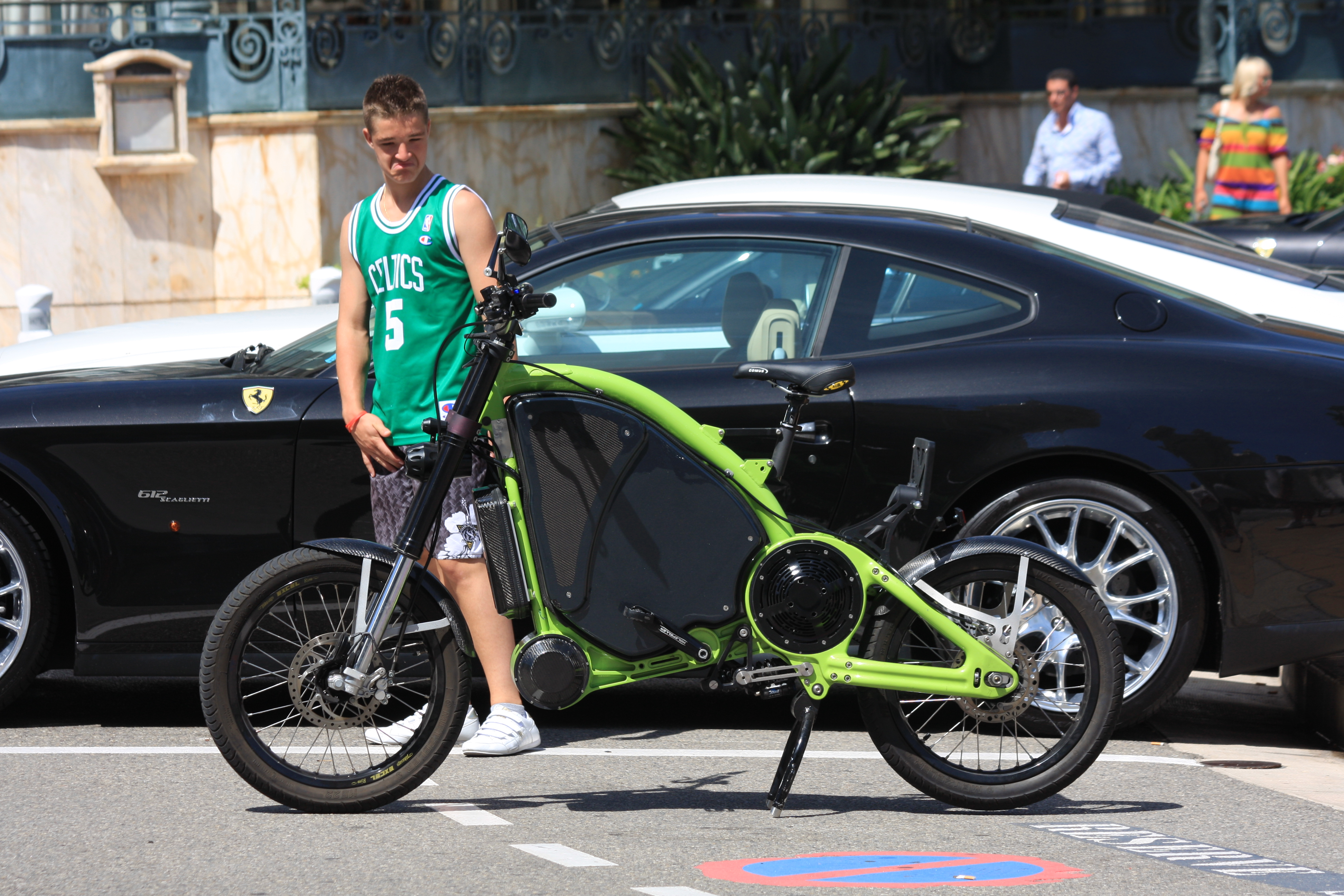
- 1st prototypes of the eROCKIT bike
- Manufacturer: eROCKIT Systems GmbH
- Production: 2020
- Class: Motorized bicycle
- Top speed: 89 km/h
- Power: 5kW continuous / 16kW peak
- Torque: 75 Nm
- Transmission: clutch-free HTD Belt Drive
- Tires: front: 1.85x17" - rear: 2.50x17" Heidenau K80
- Wheelbase: 1450mm
- Weight: 120 kg (dry)
- Fuel capacity: 6.6 kWh
- Range: 100-130 km

The eROCKIT is a light electric motorcycle that is operated like a bicycle. It is the first pedal controlled electric motorcycle, called Human Hybrid. In contrast to a pedelec, there is no direct mechanical energy transfer from the pedals to the rear wheel. The vehicle is developed and produced by eROCKIT Systems GmbH in Germany under the direction of the managing director, Andreas Zurwehme. It was designed by Konstantinos Heyer.

== History ==
First prototypes were created in the alternative Berlin bicycle scene. eROCKIT Systems GmbH has acquired the brand and all rights to the vehicle and develops and produces the eROCKIT with a team of international two-wheeler experts in production halls in the town of Hennigsdorf near Berlin.

== Technical details ==
To move the eROCKIT, the user has to pedal, as there is no throttle installed. The speed of the vehicle is exclusively controlled by the pedals. A drive belt transmits the pedal rotation to a small generator that both feeds electricity into the system and triggers current for the motor controller.

The rear wheel is powered by an electric motor, connected through an additional drive belt, which is also used as a brake recuperation system to return braking energy to the batteries. In addition to the recuperation system, the eROCKIT is equipped with a front and a rear disc brake.

The range of the battery charge is 120 km depending on user behavior. The vehicle has 3 selectable driving modes (Eco / Normal / Sport) that limits the power output and helps to save energy. The charging of the batteries takes place at a normal 110-230 V socket. Since the vehicle is licensed as a light motorcycle (vehicle class L3e) for road traffic, a driving license of European class A1 is required. The vehicle can accelerate up to 100km/h.

== See also ==
- Pedelec – Bicycle where the rider's pedalling is assisted by an electric motor
- Sinclair C5 – One-person electric vehicle (1985)
