= Tidalforce Electric Bicycle =

Former US bicycle manufacturer

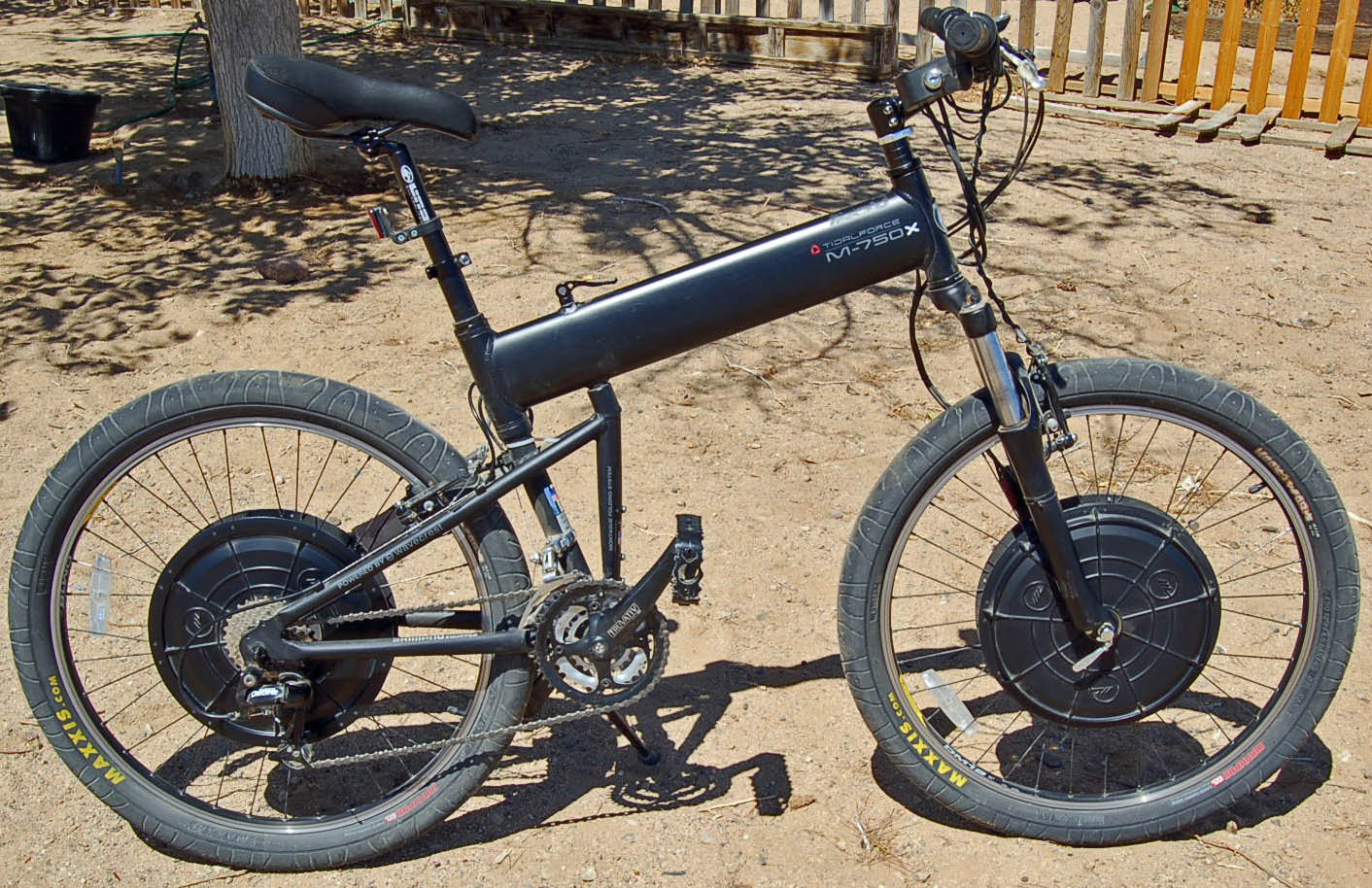
Tidalforce Electric Bicycle

The Tidalforce Electric Bicycle was an electric bicycle manufactured by Wavecrest Labs from 2003 until the company went out of business in 2006. All models of Wavecrest Tidalforce electric bikes have a 36 volt electric hub motor built into the rear wheel hub and a 36 volt battery pack built into the front wheel hub. Wavecrest Labs manufactured three models of Tidalforce bikes: The Wavecrest Tidalforce M-750, the S-750 Traditional hard tail mountain bike and the iO-750 Cruiser. Any of the three bikes with an X suffix denotes that the motor is a 1000 watt motor without a set speed restriction as compared to the speed limit 750 watt version.

The Wavecrest Tidalforce M-750 was based on The original military experimental M-313 model. The M-313/M-750X was the first electric bike to be made and tested by Wavecrest Labs. It is based on a design developed for the Defense Advanced Research Projects Agency (DARPA) that was meant to allow zero-heat long distance troop movements for the United States Marine Corps in Afghanistan. The rear wheel in-hub motor and 36 volt/8ah front-hub battery were mounted onto a standard Montague Bicycles Paratrooper Bicycle frame. The 1000 watt rear hub motor had no set speed restriction, but was limited to about 25-32 (depending on load weight) MPH on a flat course. The distance the bike traveled on a single charge ranged from 15 miles (heavier load with no pedaling) to about 25 miles (vigorous assisted pedaling with less hill climbing).

The later commercial versions had speed restrictions to comply with federal law with 750 watt restrictions (500 watts maximum in the Canadian version) but had 1000 watt unrestricted speed as an add on option.

After Wavecrest Labs went out of business, it was arranged for service and support for Tidalforce bicycles to be taken over by Light Electric Vehicle Technologies, located in Idaho.

== See also ==
- Electric motorcycles and scooters
- Low-speed vehicle
- Montague Bicycles
- Timeline of transportation technology
