= Revelo Electric =

- Industry: Clean Mobility
- Founded: 2012, in Toronto, ON, Canada
- Founder: Henry Chong
- Headquarters: Toronto, Canada
- Area served: Worldwide
- Products: LIFEbike (sold out); LE-1 (sold out); FLEX

Revelo Electric (REvolutionary VELO; "vélo" is French for "bike") is a Canadian clean mobility company that designs, develops, sells and services Revelo's front pedaling chainless electric bicycles. The company was founded in Toronto in 2012 by CEO Henry Chong, as Revelo Bikes Inc., and the name was changed to Revelo Electric Corp. in 2014. Revelo's core design principles are ease of use and ease of maintenance, and have created their products to fit these principles.

As a Toronto, Canada startup, Revelo has received funding from OCE, VentureStart, and was launched via OCAD University's Imagination Catalyst incubator hub and MaRS Discovery District's entrepreneurship program. The company received backing from crowdfunding via Indiegogo in 2013 for their original LIFEbike concept,. In 2015, their foldable electric bike, the FLEX, was launched.

== Models ==
Revelo's LIFEbike

=== LIFEbike ===
The LIFEbike (short for Lightweight, Intelligent, Flexible Electric bike) is an electric commuter bike designed from scratch by Henry Chong. The original LIFEbike concept was created by Chong for his Industrial Design thesis at OCAD University in 2011. The next year, it won Chong the MaRS Upstart competition. Deciding to turn what was a project into a marketable idea, Chong launched the LIFEbike on Indiegogo for crowdfunding in the spring of 2013. By July 26, 2013, the campaign had funded $26,656, surpassing its goal of $25,000.

The LIFEbike won the 2012 MaRS Up-Start! competition, which came with a $10,000 prize, enabling Revelo Electric to kick off.

The first prototypes for the LIFEbike were handmade by Chong and tested by 170 riders ranging in age from 16 to 74. The final bikes were manufactured in Canada and shipped out in March 2014.

Revelo's LE-1 in white.

=== LE-1 ===
The LE-1 (Light Electric One) bike is an electric commuter bike launched in May 2014 at the OCE Discovery Conference for limited release. Revamped from the LIFEbike, the bike was renamed to LE-1 for its launch. With its limited production, as of October 2015, the LE-1 is sold out.

==== Specifications ====
Weight	13.8 kg (including battery)
Speed	Up to 25 km/h
Range	30 km per charge
Motor	250W High torque brushless geared
Battery	Lithium

=== FLEX ===
The FLEX is a folding, electric commuting bike released on October 15, 2015, for pre-ordering. The FLEX was designed to fold to enable easy and practical commuting for its riders. In its folded state, it can be rolled to let commuters use multiple modes of transportation.

During the development of the FLEX, its prototypes and final product samples were tested by over 1000 people. Manufacturing was to be completed overseas in China and the first orders were to be delivered in April 2016.

==== Specifications ====
Weight	12.1 kg (without battery)
Speed	Up to 28 km/h
Range	30 km per charge
Motor	Rear mounted 250W High torque brushless geared
Battery	2.8 kg (6.3 lb), 36V 10aH, Samsung Lithium

== Awards ==
Year	Award	Category	Result
2011	ACIDO Rocket Show	Juror's Select Transport Design	Won
2011	ACIDO Rocket Show	IDEACIOUS award for innovation	Won
2011	ACIDO Rocket Show	Jonathan Liberty Award for Innovation	Won
2011	OCADU	Urbane Cycling OCADU Eugene Yao Bicycle Design Award	Won
2011	OCADU	Bring your Idea to Market	Won
2012	MaRS	Upstart	Won
2013	International Startup Festival	Elevator Pitch	Nominated
2015	Toronto Regional Board of Trade Business Excellence Award	Sustainability	Nominated
