= Bion =

Bion may refer to:

== Science ==
- Bion (satellite), an ongoing series of Soviet and Russian satellites beginning in the 1960s
- Bion, in physics, the bound state of two solitons
- Bions, hypothetical corpuscles of biological energy proposed by psychoanalyst Wilhelm Reich

== Places ==
- Bion, Manche, a commune in France
- Saint-Agnin-sur-Bion, a commune of southeastern France
- Revest-du-Bion, a French commune near the Alps

== People with the given name Bion ==
- Bion of Proconnesus, fl. 6th century BC, ancient Greek writer
- Bion of Miletus, a Greek sculptor (6th–5th century BC)
- Bion of Smyrna, also known as Bion of Phlossa, bucolic Greek poet (fl. 2nd century BC)
- Bion (poet), a tragic poet
- Bion, a melic poet of uncertain date, mentioned by Diogenes Laertius, about whom little is known
- Bion, a sophist mentioned by 3rd century writer Helenius Acron as having condemned Homer for not writing about his subjects in a historically accurate way
- Bion of Syracuse, Greek rhetorician of uncertain date, who wrote theoretical works on rhetoric
- Bion, Greek rhetorician, distinct from the above, who wrote a work on an uncertain topic, which was divided into nine books named after the nine muses
- Bion of Abdera, a Greek philosopher from the school of Democritus (fl. c. 4th century BC)
- Bion of Soli, an ancient Greek writer of history
- Caecilius Bion, ancient writer about agriculture
- Bion of Borysthenes, Greek philosopher (325–250 BC)
- Bion Barnett, the founder of Barnett Bank, in Florida
- Bion Tsang, American cellist and professor
- Bion J. Arnold, 1861–1942, American electrical engineer

== People with the surname Bion ==
- Louis-Eugène Bion (1807-1860), French sculptor
- Nicholas Bion (1652–1733), French scientific instrument-maker
- Wilfred Bion, a British psychoanalyst
- Anne-Sophie Bion, French film editor

== Other uses ==
- Bion (opera), by the French composer Étienne Méhul
- BionX, Canadian maker of electric motors for bicycles
- Bion, a fictional planet in Metroid Prime: Federation Force

== See also ==
- Bionic
