= Electric bikes =

The term Electric bikes may refer to:

- Electric motorcycles and scooters
- Electric bicycles
  - Pedelec (pedal electric cycle), electric bicycle where the rider's pedalling is assisted by a small electric motor
