= Rubbee Drive =

Bicycle friction drive module

Rubbee Drive is a 250W friction drive module which fits most standard bicycles. It enables a bicycle to reach up to 25 km/h speed and travel 40 km, making it a viable option for daily commuting. The units are assembled by JSC ELINTA in Lithuania.

== History ==
Rubbee Drive was launched as a Kickstarter campaign in July 2013. It was successfully funded and the 1.0 version was introduced to the market in early 2014. In July 2014 Rubbee team introduced the 2.0 version to the market. It featured a reduction in weight, increased torque and an updated installation mechanism that further decreased the installation time.

Pedal Assist Sensor (PAS) was introduced as the main control method, following the EU regulations for e-bikes. In March 2015 a new updated version was released that introduced improvements to the battery management system, PAS management and higher torque output.

As of 2015, the Rubbee Drive weighs 6.8 kg (16 lb) and has a recharge time of 3 hours. It works with a 14.4 V 20 Ah LiFePO_{4} battery pack.

== Design features ==
No tools are needed to install Rubbee, and one Rubbee drive can be shared between two or more bicycles. The drive will fit bicycles with the wheel size of 16-29 inches and tire width of 20–60 mm.

== See also ==
- E-bike laws
