= Bion of Proconnesus =

6th century BCE Greek historian

Bion (Ancient Greek: Βίων) of Proconnesus was a writer of ancient Greece. He was a contemporary of "Pherecydes", often presumed to be the mythographer Pherecydes of Syros, which would therefore place him around 560 BCE. Some scholars disagree about which Pherecydes was meant.

He is mentioned by Diogenes Laertius as the author of two works which he does not specify; but we must infer from Clement of Alexandria, that one of these was an abridging of the work of the ancient historian and logographer, Cadmus of Miletus. He wrote on the early history of Ionia.
