= Caecilius Bion =

Ancient Roman writer

Caecilius Bion (Ancient Greek: Βίων) of a writer whose country is unknown, but who is mentioned by Pliny the Elder among the external sources (Auctores Externi) he consulted for his own works.

Of his date it can only be said that he must have lived some time in or before the first century CE. He wrote a work titled On the Properties of Plants and other Medicines, which is not now extant, but which was used by Pliny. He is implied to have been an expert on the geography of north-east Africa.

Some scholars have speculated whether he is the same person as Bion of Soli.
