= Pherecydes =

Pherecydes or Pherekedes (Ancient Greek: Φερεκύδης) was the name of three ancient Greek writers, who may not all be distinct:

- Pherecydes of Syros (fl. 6th century BC), a pre-Socratic philosopher from the island of Syros, believed by some to have influenced Pythagoras
- Pherecydes of Athens (fl. c. 465 BC), an historian and genealogist (= FGrHist 3), perhaps the same person as Pherecydes of Leros (below)
- Pherecydes of Leros (before 480-477 BC), an historian from the Greek island of Leros, possibly the same person as Pherecydes of Athens (above)

Pherecydes can also refers to:

- Pherecydes (spider), a genus of spiders
