= BionX =

Canadian company producing electric bicycle motors

BionX logo

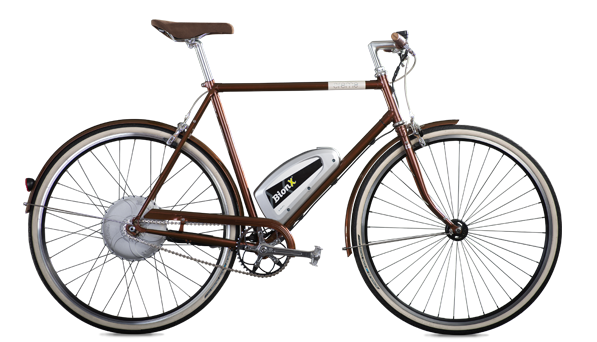

BionX was a Canadian maker of electric motors for bicycles as well as bicycle retrofit kits, operating from 1998 to 2018, originally named EPS (Electric Propulsion Systems) .

BionX was headquartered in Aurora, Ontario where motors were produced and assembled before being marketed in over 15 countries. Research and development was based in Sherbrooke, Quebec. The European sales and service center was located near Munich, Germany.

== History ==
In 1998, entrepreneur Jean-Yves Dubé formed Energy and Propulsion Systems (EPS), a company in Quebec, Canada. In 2000, the name was changed to "BionX". About then, the term pedelec was introduced for bicycles using the BionX system, where the motor is activated by pedalling force.

In 2008, the company was acquired by Magna and by then its motors had become standard in many ebikes in Europe and North America, including bikes by Trek and Matra, Kalkhoff.

In 2011, Bionix introduced SeaScape, an electrically assisted paddle-boat product line.

On February 27, 2018, BionX Canada went into receivership, its 80 employees were dismissed, and the company was shut down temporarily to find a buyer. Grant Thornton Limited was appointed as Receiver. In June 2018, parts of the business were sold off to three other businesses, and the rest of the company assets were liquidated via online auction that ended August 15, 2018. By October 2018, BionX's receiver sold the company's intellectual property, patents, trademarks, software web domains as well as remaining inventory with court approval to Amego Electric Vehicles and its nominee Leisger Cycle Inc.

== Motors ==
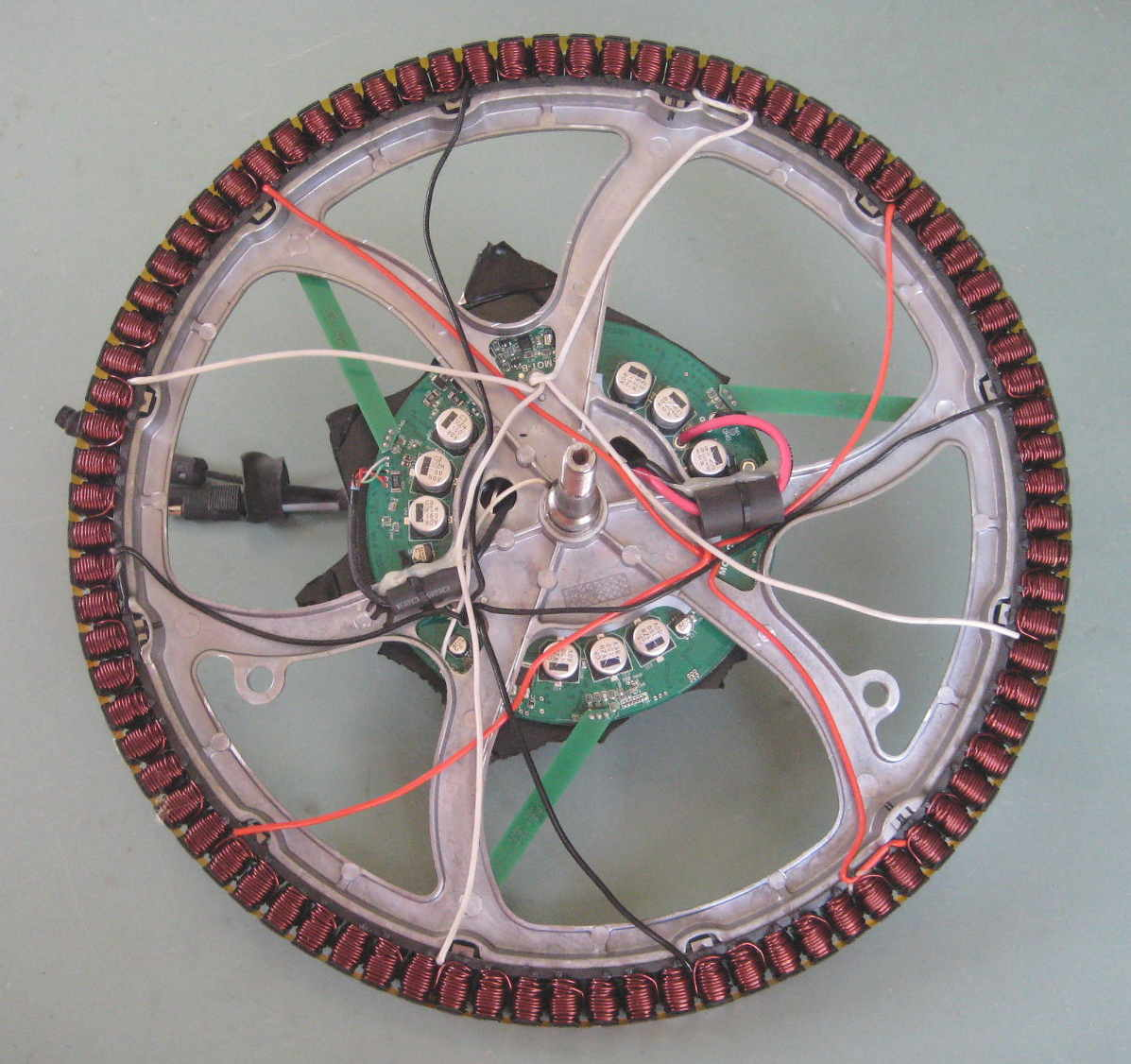
Stator of a BionX D hub-motor with 84 poles and control electronics. The complete motor with rotor is ~0.34 m diameter and needs at least a 20" wheel rim.

BionX motors are incorporated in large rear wheel hubs and are noted for their low noise; regenerative braking capability and hub-embedded motor controller. The sensor for pedalling force is made of strain gages on the axle, which is very tightly clamped at the required angle in the rear fork ends and must take up the entire motor torque.

The D series of motors was the most recent and strongest BionX technology with a torque of 25/50 Nm. The motor cylinder was larger but thinner than previous versions and weighed 4.0 kg (8.8 lb). Before that was the S series which with 3.5 kg (7.7 lb) was lighter than the P series at the same strength. The P series motors were the first produced by Bionx. They had a torque of 9/40 Nm at a weight of 4.7 kg (10.4 lb).

| | Watts* | Voltage | Weight | Year | Source |
|---|---|---|---|---|---|
| D-500 | 500W (NA), 250W (EU) | 48V | 4.08 kg | 2015 | |
| S-350 | 350W (NA) | 48V | 4.08 kg | 2014 | |
| P-350 | 350W (NA), 250W (EU) | 36V | 4.7 kg | 2014 | |
| SL-350 | 350W (NA) | 48V | 4.3 kg | 2013 | |
| PL-350 | 350W (NA) | 37V | 4.3 kg | 2013 | |
| PL-250 | 250W (NA) | 26V | 4.3 kg | 2013 | |

*Since the maximum legal power specifications in Watts are different for the same motor in North America and Europe, the name varies. For example, the P-350 is usually sold as the P-250 in Europe.

While Bionx had competition from several wheel hub-based motor companies, including Panasonic (e.g. KTM's eRace), Alber's Xion (lately in Kalkhoff bikes), Heinzmann, and GoSwiss, their primary competitor was the Bosch eBike.

== Controllers ==
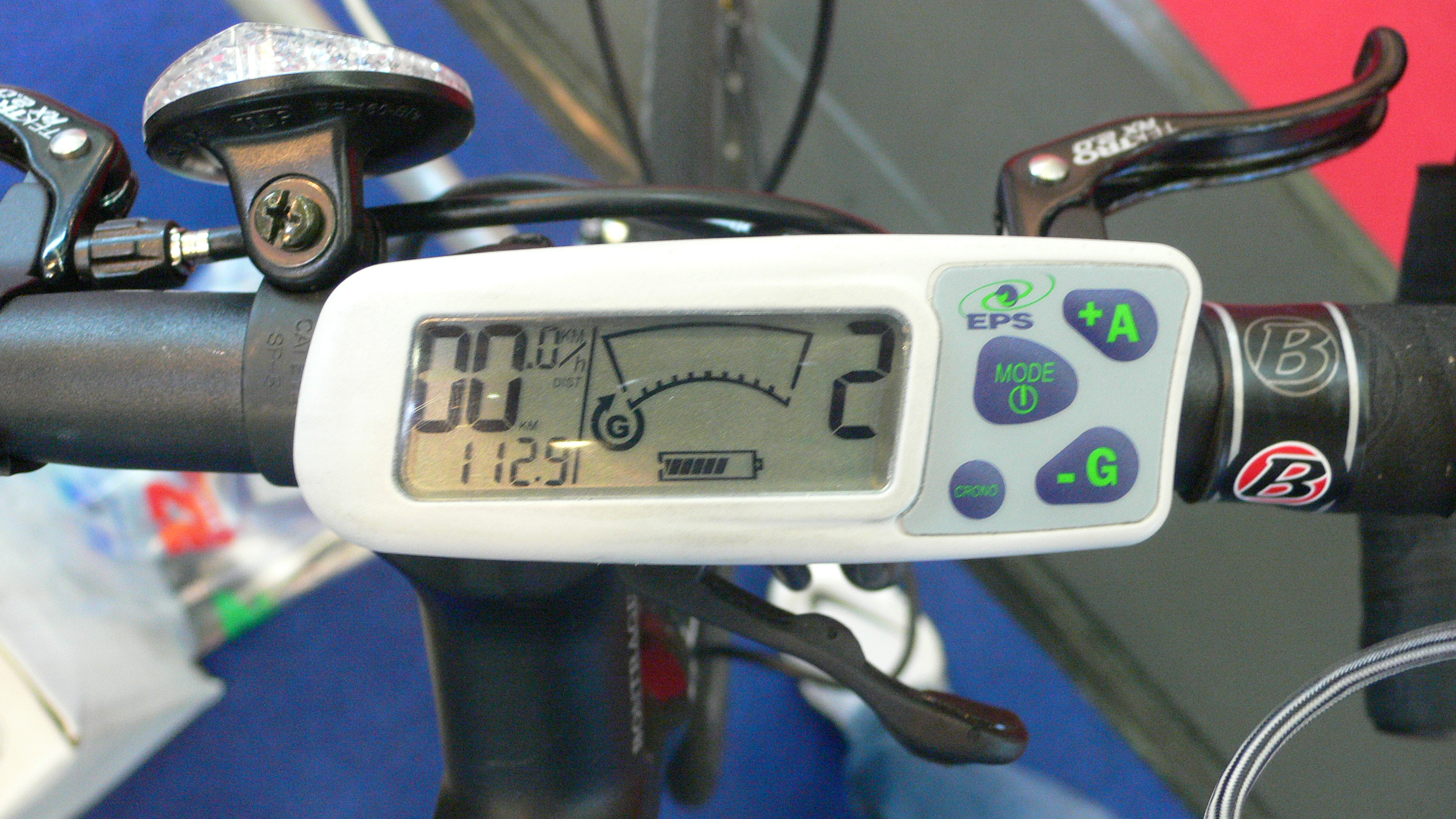
Bionx controller

The BionX electronics consists of three parts, the charging unit in the battery box - itself supplied by an external power supply, the power electronics in the hub motor, and the controller on the handlebar. This uses 4 buttons for on-off, choosing power and braking levels, and for programming numerous parameters such as acceleration and cut-off speed. Dealers could also do the programming via an attached computer. The display shows mainly power level, speeds and battery level.

== See also ==
- Pedelec
- Electric bicycle
- Electric motor
