= Bion of Abdera =

Ancient Greek mathematician and astronomer

Bion of Abdera (c. 430 – 370 BC) (Greek: Βίων ὁ Ἀβδηρίτης, gen. Βίωνος) was a Greek mathematician and astronomer of Abdera, Thrace, and a pupil of Democritus. Strabo refers to him as an astrologer. He wrote both in the Ionic and Attic dialects, and was the first who said that there were some parts of the Earth in which it was night for six months, while the remaining six months were one uninterrupted day. He also engaged in correlating the direction of winds with climate and is believed to have traveled to distant regions.
