= Electric bicycle laws =

Laws ruling electric bicycles

Many countries have enacted electric vehicle laws to regulate the use of electric bicycles, also termed e-bikes. Some jurisdictions have regulations governing safety requirements and standards of manufacture. The members of the European Union and other regions have wider-ranging legislation covering use and safety.

Laws and terminology are diverse. Some countries have national regulations with additional regional regulations for each state, province, or municipality. Systems of classification and nomenclature may vary.

Different jurisdictions use different definitions of what an electric bicycle is. Some classify pedal-controlled pedelecs as being distinct from other bicycles using electric power. Some consider anything motor-powered with pedals (or functional pedals) an ebike. Some police departments will impound and destroy anything that doesn't fit the definition and others leave un-definable electric vehicles largely unregulated. Consequently, any particular e-bike may be subject to different classifications and regulations in different jurisdictions.

== Australia ==
In Australia, the e-bike is defined by the Australian Vehicle Standards as a bicycle that has an auxiliary motor with a maximum power output not exceeding 250 W without consideration for speed limits or pedal sensors. Each state is responsible for deciding how to treat such a vehicle and currently all states agree that such a vehicle does not require licensing or registration. Some states have their own rules such as no riding under electric power on bike paths and through built-up areas so riders should view the state laws regarding their use. There is no license and no registration required for e-bike use.

Since 30 May 2012, Australia has an additional new e-bike category using the European Union model of a pedelec as per the CE EN15194 standard. This means the e-bike can have a motor of 250W of continuous rated power which can only be activated by pedalling (if above 6 km/h) and must cut out over 25 km/h – if so it is classed as a normal bicycle. The state of Victoria is the first to amend its local road rules, see below.

Road vehicles in Australia must comply with all applicable Australian Design Rules (ADRs) before they can be supplied to the market for use in transport (Motor Vehicle Standards Act 1989 Cwth).

The ADRs contain the following definitions for bicycles and mopeds:

- 4.2. Two-Wheeled and Three-Wheeled Vehicles
- 4.2.1. PEDAL CYCLE (AA)

A vehicle designed to be propelled through a mechanism solely by human power.

- 4.2.2. POWER-ASSISTED PEDAL CYCLE (AB)

A pedal cycle to which is attached one or more auxiliary propulsion motors having a combined maximum power output not exceeding 200 watts.

- 4.2.3. MOPED - 2 Wheels (LA)

A 2-wheeled motor vehicle, not being a power-assisted pedal cycle, with an engine cylinder capacity not exceeding 50 ml and a "Maximum Motor Cycle Speed" not exceeding 50 km/h; or a 2-wheeled motor vehicle with a power source other than a piston engine and a "Maximum Motor Cycle Speed" not exceeding 50 km/h.

(Vehicle Standard (Australian Design Rule – Definitions and Vehicle Categories 2005 Compilation 3 19 September 2007).

There are no ADRs applicable to AA or AB category vehicles. There are ADRs for lighting, braking, noise, controls and dimensions for LA category vehicles, mostly referencing the equivalent UN ECE Regulations. An approval is required to supply to the market any road vehicle to which ADRs apply and an import approval is required to import any road vehicle into Australia.

=== New South Wales ===
In New South Wales, there are two types of power-assisted pedal cycle. For the first type, the electric motor's maximum power output must not exceed 200 watts, and the pedal cycle cannot be propelled exclusively by the motor. For the second type, known as a "pedalec", the vehicle must comply with the European Standard for Power Assisted Pedal Cycles (EN15194).

Since October 2014 all petrol powered cycles are explicitly banned.

From February 2023 pedelac bikes in NSW were able to have a 500 watt motor. The previous government said more powerful motors would assist riders in hilly areas.

On November 21, 2025 the Australian Government committed to reinstating e-bike import requirements EN-15194 (250W and 25 km/h limits). In December 2025 the NSW Government moved to restrict e-bike motor power to a 250W limit, bringing NSW in line with other Australian jurisdictions.

In December 2025, Chris Minns stated the government would have to grandfather [sic] the EN-15194 (250W and 25 km/h limits) scheme in.

On February 20, 2026 it was announced that a review led by Transport for NSW will recommend a legal minimum age between 12 and 16 for riding an e-bike in NSW and reconsider whether children will be permitted to carry passengers. The review will include consultation with NSW Office for Youth and Young People and the public. From March 1, 2029 only EN-15194 certified e-bikes will be road legal in NSW. The age limit will be implemented by the end of 2026.

Higher age limits for e-bikes may be a concern in areas where teenagers use e-bikes to travel to school.

Jacqui Scruby has requested consideration into licensing and registration for e-bike use in NSW.

==== Seizure and crushing of e-bikes in New South Wales ====
In February 2026 the New South Wales Government introduced new laws permitting NSW Police new powers to seize and crush illegal e-bikes.

The policies were announced by NSW Transport Minister John Graham (Australian politician), who claimed the government's new powers "goes far past the NSW Liberals’ idea". John Graham said the crackdown was in response to community frustration and concerns about "souped-up e-bikes" and "anti-social behaviour". The amendment to the so-called "hoon laws" will allow police to avoid a court process as was required.

To identify illegal ebikes, the government purchased 3 portable 'dyno units' to measure the power output and ensure power assistance cuts out 25 km/h, per NSW limits. The units were ordered from the Netherlands.

The new laws do not require e-bikes to be registered, as proposed by Natalie Ward (politician) of the New South Wales Liberal Party. The Daily Telegraph (Sydney) stated on February 8, 2026 "new laws are part of a package of measures the Minns government will be rolling out over the coming weeks" and ABC News stated "More changes will be announced in coming weeks". On January 15 John Graham said the government was considering (or "not ruling out") a licensing or number plate system for e-bikes.

According to The Daily Telegraph (Sydney), bikes with extra power and speed are technically not e-bikes, but motorbikes.

The legislation was expected to be introduced to parliament by mid-2026. It is not known when the laws will come into effect.

The NSW Government or NSW Police supplied a 26 second video handout to the media of an electric bicycle being repeatedly crushed by a mechanical claw.

Similar laws are already in place in Western Australia. In January 2026, WA Police seized and crushed more than 30 overpowered ebikes. 54 illegal e-bikes were crushed in a two-week period.

The proposed new measures were welcomed by the NRMA, which urged the community to get behind them. In 2026 the NRMA "spearheaded" a campaign to "introduce registration and identification requirements for e-bikes" and "calls for set of reforms around e-bike use".

2GB claimed their January 2026 radio interviews led to the new policy. On January 20 2GB interviewed Acting Inspector Scott Gillis from the WA Police Force, who had seized e-ridables in an operation focused on Joondalup. On January 21 2GB "raised the plan" with the New South Wales Police Commissioner Mal Lanyon. On January 27, 2GB asked the NSW Opposition Leader Kellie Sloane "for her thoughts", who stated it was a "great incentive". On February 3, 2GB interviewed the Premier of New South Wales

Chris Minns and "asked him if he'd be interested in adopting the policy". The policy announcement was made "just three weeks after first being raised on 2GB". ABC Media Watch have stated 2GB is a section of the media with a history of "Bike bashing".

==== Legality of fat-tyred bikes ("fat bikes") ====
"Fat bikes" or fat-tyre bikes are legal if they maximum continuous power of 500 watts or less, the motor cuts out at 25 km/h and the throttle does not function above 6 km/h (or meet EN-15194). However there are very few road legal "fat bike" models.

In February 2026, a large number of media outlets incorrectly used "fat bikes" as a synonym for e-bikes illegal to use on a public road, however ABC News did not.

=== Victoria ===
A bicycle designed to be propelled by human power using pedals may have an electric or petrol powered motor attached provided the motor's maximum power output does not exceed 200 watts.

As of 18 September 2012, the Victorian road rules have changed to enable a pedelec to be used as a bicycle in Victoria. The change allows more options of power assisted pedal cycles under bicycle laws.

A pedelec is defined as meeting EU standard EN15194, has a motor of no more than 250w of continuous rated power and which is only to be activated by pedalling when travelling at speeds of between 6 km/h and 25 km/h.

=== Queensland ===
In Queensland, the situation is similar to Victoria. There are two types of legal motorised bicycle. For the first type, the electric motor must not be capable of generating more than 200 watts of power. For the second type, known as a "pedalec", the vehicle must comply with the European Standard for Power Assisted Pedal Cycles (EN15194).

The pedals on a motorised bicycle must be the primary source of power for the vehicle. If the motor is the primary source of power then the device cannot be classed as a motorised bicycle. For example, a device where the rider can twist a throttle and complete a journey using motor power only without using the pedals, would not be classed as a motorised bicycle.

Motorised bicycles can be ridden on all roads and paths, except where bicycles are specifically excluded. Riders do not need to have a driver licence to ride a motorised bicycle.

=== Western Australia ===
In Western Australia, illegal e-bikes (more accurately described as unregistered electric motorbikes) can be crushed. Joondalup Acting Inspector Scott Gillis stated on 2GB (a Sydney radio station) that 54 illegal e-bikes were crushed in a two-week period in their focused district area. In January 2026 WA Police seized and crushed more than 30 overpowered ebikes.

== Canada ==
Eight provinces of Canada allow electric power-assisted bicycles. In all eight provinces, e-bikes are limited to 500 W output, and cannot travel faster than 32 km/h (20 mph) on motor power alone on level ground. In Alberta prior to July 1, 2009, the limits were 750 W and 35 km/h (22 mph), but presently match federal legislation. Age restrictions vary in Canada. All require an approved helmet. Regulations may or may not require an interlock to prevent the use of power when the rider is not pedaling. Some versions (e.g., if capable of operating without pedaling) of e-bikes require drivers' licenses in some provinces and have age restrictions. Vehicle licenses and liability insurance are not required. Generally, they are considered vehicles (like motorcycles and pedal cycles), so are subject to the same rules of the road as regular bicycles. In some cases, regulatory requirements have been complicated by lobbying in respect of the Segway PT.

Bicycles assisted by a gasoline motor or other fuel are regulated differently from e-bikes. These are classified as motorcycles, regardless of the power output of the motor and maximum attainable speed.

Note that in Canada, the term "assist bicycle" is the technical term for an e-bike and "power-assisted bicycle" is used in the Canadian Federal Legislation, but is carefully defined to only apply to electric motor assist, and specifically excludes internal combustion engines (though this is not the case in the United States).

=== Federal requirements ===
Since 2000, Canada's Motor Vehicle Safety Regulations (MVSR) have defined Power Assisted bicycles (PABs) as a separate category, and which require no license to operate. PABs are currently defined as a two- or three-wheeled bicycle equipped with handlebars and operable pedals, an attached electric motor of 500W or less, and a maximum speed capability of 32 km/h from the motor over level ground. Other requirements include a permanently affixed label from the manufacturer in a conspicuous location stating the vehicle is a power-assisted bicycle under the statutory requirements in force at the time of manufacture. All power-assisted bicycles must utilize an electric motor for assisted propulsion.

A power-assisted bicycle may be imported and exported freely within Canada without the same restrictions placed on auto-mobiles or a moped. Under federal law, power-assisted bicycles may be restricted from operation on some roads, lanes, paths, or thoroughfares by the local municipality.

Bicycle-style PABs are permitted on National Capital Commission's (NCC) Capital Pathway network, but scooter-style PABs are prohibited. All PABs (bicycle- and scooter-style) are permitted on dedicated NCC bike lanes. All PABs are prohibited in Gatineau Park's natural surface trails.

=== Provincial requirements for use ===
==== Alberta ====
Alberta identifies e-bikes as "power bicycles" and is consistent with the federal definition of "power-assisted bicycle" in MVSR CRC, c 1038 s 2. Motor output must not exceed 500 W (0.67 hp) and e-bikes cannot travel faster than 32 km/h (20 mph). Fully operable pedals are required. No driver's license, vehicle insurance, or vehicle registration is required. Operators must be 12 years of age or older. All operators are required to wear a motorcycle helmet meeting the standards set in AR 122/2009 s 112(2). A passenger is permitted only if the e-bike is equipped with a seat designated for that passenger.

==== British Columbia ====
An e-bike is identified as a "motor-assisted cycle" (MAC) in British Columbia, which differs from electric mopeds and scooters, which are "limited-speed motorcycles". Motor-assisted cycles must: have an electric motor of no more than 500 W; have fully operable pedals; not be capable of propelling the device at a speed greater than 32 km/h (20 mph)]. The engine must disengage when (a) the operator stops pedaling, (b) an accelerator controller is released, OR (c) a brake is applied. A driver's license, vehicle registration, and insurance are all not required. Rider must be 16 years old or more, and a bike helmet must be worn.

E-bikes in British Columbia must comply with all standards outlined in Motor Assisted Cycle Regulation, BC Reg 151/2002.

==== Ontario ====
Ontario is one of the last provinces in Canada to move toward legalizing power-assisted bicycles (PABs) for use on roads, even though they have been federally defined and legal in Canada since early 2001. In November 2005, "Bill 169" received royal assent allowing the Ministry of Transportation of Ontario (MTO) to place any vehicle on road. On October 4, 2006, the Minister of Transportation for Ontario Donna Cansfield announced the Pilot Project allowing PABs which meet the federal standards definition for operation on road. PAB riders must follow the rules and regulations of a regular bicycles, wear an approved bicycle helmet and be at least 16 years or older. There are still a number of legal considerations for operating any bicycle in Ontario.

On October 5, 2009, the Government of Ontario brought in laws regulating electric bikes in the province. E-bikes, which can reach a speed of 32 kilometres per hour, are allowed to share the road with cars, pedestrians and other traffic throughout the province. The new rules limit the maximum weight of an e-bike to 120 kilograms, require a maximum braking distance of nine metres and prohibit any modifications to the bike's motor that would create speeds greater than 32 kilometres per hour. Also, riders must be at least 16 years of age, wear approved bicycle or motorcycle helmets and follow the same traffic laws as bicyclists. Municipalities are also specifically permitted by the legislation to restrict where e-bikes may be used on their streets, bike lanes and trails, as well as restricting certain types of e-bike (e.g. banning "scooter-style" e-bikes from bicycle trails). E-bikes are not permitted on 400-series highways, expressways or other areas where bicycles are not allowed. Riding an e-bike under the age of 16 or riding an e-bike without an approved helmet are new offences in the legislation, carrying fines of between $60 and $500. E-bike riders are subject to the same penalties as other cyclists for all other traffic offences.

==== Manitoba ====
E-bikes are legal in Manitoba, so long as certain stipulations are met. The bike must not be designed to have more than three wheels touching the ground, the motor must stop providing motive power if the bike exceeds 32 km/h for any reason, the motor must be smaller than 500W, it has to have functioning pedals, if it is engaged by a throttle, the motor immediately stops providing the vehicle with motive power when the driver activates a brake, and if engaged by the driver applying muscle power to the pedals, the motor immediately stops providing the vehicle with motive power when the driver stops applying muscle power. The bike must also have either a mechanism to turn the electric motor on and off that can be operated by the driver, and if the vehicle has a throttle, is separate from the throttle, or a mechanism that prevents the motor from engaging until the vehicle is traveling at 3 km/h or more. The user must also be at least 14 years of age to operate an E-bike. All other Manitoba laws regarding cycling also apply.

==== New Brunswick ====
To be allowed on the road it needs wheel rims larger than 9 inches, have a headlight for night, a seat at least 27 inches off the ground.

New Brunswick's Policy on Electric Motor Driven Cycles and Electric Bicycles

The Registrar will permit an electric motor driven cycle to be registered if it meets Canada Motor Vehicle Safety Standards (CMVSS) as a Limited Speed Motorcycle, or Scooter as is done with gas powered motor driven cycles. If the vehicle was manufactured after 1988, it will bear a compliance label stating that it meets these standards. The operator will be subject to all the requirements placed on operators of motor driven cycles.

If the vehicle is able to powered by human force and has a motor 500W or less, and the motor is not capable of assisting when the vehicle is traveling at a speed greater than 32 km/h then it can be considered a bicycle and all the requirements placed on bicyclists are applicable.

If a vehicle has an electric motor greater than 500 watts and is capable of powering the vehicle when traveling at a speed greater than 32 km/h and it does not have a CMVSS compliance label it cannot be registered unless the owner can prove, by having the vehicle certified by an engineer, that it is safe for operation on NB highways. Also, not all vehicles are suitable for operation on NB highways and it could be that the vehicle in question may not be a motor driven cycle or a bicycle and cannot be operated on the highway at all.

Power Assisted Bicycle Label:

Manufacturers of e-bikes must permanently affix a label, in a conspicuous location, stating in both official languages that the vehicle is a power-assisted bicycle as defined in the regulations under the federal Motor Vehicle Safety Act. Homemade e-bikes will not have this label.

NOTE 1: The previous version of the policy had a section on it needing to "look like a bike" or a "bike style frame" but never defined what those were. That has been dropped and is no longer part of the new policy.

NOTE 2: The top speed of the bike if propelled by human power is the posted speed limit, but the motor is only allowed to get up to and keep at 32 km/h. If the posted limit is under 32 then the posted limit is the limit allowed.

NOTE 3: There is no maximum weight limit.

NOTE 4: Ebikes are allowed to use cargo trailers/kid trailers.

NOTE 5: There is no minimum age set.

NOTE 6: DUI – If you have a DUI conviction the restrictions of the DUI override the ebike policy definition of an ebike as a bicycle and put it into the motor vehicle category.

==== Nova Scotia ====
In Nova Scotia power-assisted bicycles are classified similarly to standard pedal bicycles. The Nova Scotia Motor Vehicle Act defines a power-assisted bicycle as a bicycle with an electric motor of 500 watts or less, with two wheels (one of which is at least 350 mm) or four wheels (two of which are at least 350mm). PABs are permitted on the road in the province of Nova Scotia as long as you wear an approved bicycle helmet with the chinstrap engaged. They do not have to meet the conditions defined within the Canadian Motor Vehicle Safety Regulations for a motorcycle (they are not classed as "motor vehicles"), but they do have to comply with federal regulations that define Power Assisted Bicycles.

==== Prince Edward Island ====
Are treated as Mopeds and will need to pass inspection as a moped.

==== Quebec ====
In Quebec power-assisted bicycles are often classified similarly to standard pedal bicycles. They do not have to meet the conditions defined within the Canadian Motor Vehicle Safety Regulations (they are not classed as "motor vehicles"), but they do have to comply with federal regulations that define Power Assisted Bicycles. The Quebec Highway Safety Code defines a power-assisted bicycle as a bicycle (2 or 3 wheels that touch the ground) with an electric motor with a maximum power of 500W and a top speed of 32 km/h bearing a specific compliance label permanently attached by the manufacturer. PABs are permitted on the road in the province of Quebec, but riders have to be 14 and over to ride the electric bicycle and if they are under the age of 18, must have a moped or scooter license.

==== Saskatchewan ====
Power assisted bicycles are classified in two categories in Saskatchewan. An electric assist bicycle is a 2 or 3-wheeled bicycle that uses pedals and a motor at the same time only. A power cycle uses either pedals and motor or motor only. Both must have engines with 500 watt power or less, and must not be able exceed 32 km/h (20 mph), i.e., electric motor cuts out at this speed or cycle is unable to go this fast on a level surface. The power cycle has to meet the Canadian Motor Vehicle Safety Standards (CMVSS) for a power-assisted bicycle. The power cycle requires at least a learner's driving licence (class 7), and all of the other classes 1–5 may operate these also. The electric assist bicycle does not require a licence. Helmets are required for each. Both are treated as bicycles regarding rules of the road. Gas powered or assisted bicycles are classified as motorcycles regardless of engine size or if using pedals plus motor. Stickers identifying the bicycle's compliance with the Federal classification may be required for power cycles by some cities or municipalities.

== China ==
=== Mainland ===
In China, e-bikes currently come under the same classification as bicycles and hence do not require a driver's license to operate. Previously it was required that users registered their bike in order to be recovered if stolen, although this has recently been abolished. Due to a recent rise in electric-bicycle-related accidents, caused mostly by inexperienced riders who ride on the wrong side of the road, run red lights, do not use headlights at night etc., the Chinese government plans to change the legal status of illegal bicycles so that vehicles with an unladen weight of 20 kg (44 lb) or more and a top speed of 30 km/h (19 mph) or more will require a motorcycle license to operate, while vehicles lighter than 20 kg (44 lb) and slower than 30 km/h can be ridden unlicensed. In the southern Chinese cities of Guangzhou, Dongguan and Shenzhen, e-bikes, like all motorcycles, are banned from certain downtown districts. There are also bans in place in small areas of Shanghai, Hangzhou and Beijing. Bans of "Scooter-Style Electric Bikes" (SSEB) were however cancelled and in Shenzhen e-bikes may be seen on the streets nowadays (2010–11).

Electric powered bicycles slower than 20 km/h without pedaling are legally recognized as a non-mechanically operated vehicle in China. According to "TECHNOLOGY WATCH", this should help promote its widespread use. Electric bicycles were banned in some areas of Beijing from August 2002 to January 2006 due to concerns over environmental, safety and city image issues. Beijing has re-allowed use of approved electric bicycles as of January 4, 2006. Some cities in China still ban electric bikes.

=== Hong Kong ===
Hong Kong has independent traffic laws from mainland China.

Electric bikes are considered motorcycles in Hong Kong, and therefore need type approval from the Transport Department, just as automobiles. All electric bikes available in Hong Kong fail to meet the type approval requirement, and the Transport Department has never granted any type approval for an electric bike, making all electric bikes effectively illegal in Hong Kong. Even if they got type approval, the driver would need a motorcycle driving licence to ride. As a side note, Hong Kong does not have a moped vehicle class (and therefore no moped driving license), and mopeds are considered motorcycles too.

Electric bicycles are not allowed in any public area, meaning an area where there is full or partial public access. Any kind of pedal assist, electric bike, scooter, moped or vehicle which has any form of propulsion, whether in full or as assist, other than human power, must be approved as either a car, motorcycle, van, truck, bus or similar. This makes pedelecs and tilt-controlled two-wheel personal vehicles illegal in all practical ways, as they cannot be registered as motorcycles.

== Europe ==
=== European Union definition ===
Regulation (EU) No 168/2013 of the European Parliament and of the council, which replaced 2002/24/EC on 1 January 2016 but is substantially the same, exempts vehicles with the following definition from the requirement for type approval: "pedal cycles with pedal assistance which are equipped with an auxiliary electric motor having a maximum continuous rated power of less than or equal to 250 W, where the output of the motor is cut off when the cyclist stops pedalling and is otherwise progressively reduced and finally cut off before the vehicle speed reaches 25 km/h [15.5 mph]". This is the de facto definition of an electrically assisted pedal cycle in the EU. As with all EU directives, individual member countries of the EU are left to implement the requirements in national legislation. The EU specification does not require a helmet to be worn when riding this class of bicycle.

European product safety standard EN 15194 was published in 2009. The aim of EN 15194 is "to provide a standard for the assessment of electrically powered cycles of a type which are excluded from type approval by Directive 2002/24/EC".

=== National requirements ===
==== Belgium ====
In Belgium, Technical laws passed on 09/09/2016 and 17/11/2017 allow for three types of e-bikes:

- 250 W 25 km/h limited "e-bikes" for all ages without a helmet.
- 1000 W 25 km/h limited "motorized-bikes", over 16 years, with conformity certificate, without a helmet.
- 4000 W 45 km/h limited "speed pedelecs", which are classed as mopeds for all requirements.

==== Denmark ====
In Denmark, Parliament has decided to approve the speed pedelec – a type of super electric bike that can reach speeds of up to 45 km/h – for riding on cycle paths. Danish Parliament has decided that as of 1 July 2018, those operating the superbikes only need to have turned 15 and wear an approved helmet, and a license if between 15 and 18.

"The regulations for experimental schemes with Speed Pedelecs (45 km/h) and the rules for e-bikes (25 km/h) are as follows: - A Speed Pedelec must be EU type-approved, and a physical type plate containing data from the approval must be present on the bicycle. It must not exceed 20 km/h without pedal assistance. - An e-bike can achieve a maximum speed of 6 km/h without pedal assistance (referred to as the 'walk function') and a maximum of 25 km/h with pedal assistance. The walk function can be operated via a button or twist/gas handle. - There is no specific requirement that an e-bike with a maximum 250 W motor must be EU type-approved. However, it must comply with the Machinery Directive and carry the CE mark. - Regarding how the law applies to configuring different restrictions via a computer/display, there is no specific information available."

==== Finland ====
In Finland, Bicycles meeting the European Union definition can be used without regulation. Bicycles with 250-1000 W electric motors, or which allow assistance without pedalling, are classified as L1e-A-class motorised bicycles according to EU regulation, and must be insured for use on public roads, and limited to 25 km/h.

==== Latvia ====
In Latvia, the laws do not set any additional provisions specifically for electric bicycles other than defining a "bicycle" for the Road Traffic Law as a human-powered vehicle that may be equipped with an electric motor with power of no more than 250 W.

==== Norway ====
As a member of the European Economic Area (EEA), Norway implemented the European Union definition. As in the EU, pedelec e-bikes are classified as ordinary bicycles, according to the Vehicle Regulation (kjøretøyforskriften) § 4–1, 5g, not registered in the Vehicle Registry, and with no requirement for a driving license.

==== Sweden ====
Sweden uses the European Union definition, according to the Swedish Vehicle Regulation (Trafikverket).

==== Switzerland ====
Switzerland (not an EU member) has mostly more liberal standards than most of Europe. From regulations updated in on July 1, 2025 the following categories apply:

"Light-Motorbicycles". Including tricycles. In difference to the EU rules, they are not required to be pedelecs:

   Motor: max. 500 W
   Max. speed with or without pedalling 25 km/h
   Max. total weight 250 kg
   Max. width 1 m
   No driving licence required over 16 years, category M licence for 14–16 years
   No licence plate or insurance required
   No helmet required

"Fast Motorbicycles". Like "Light-Motorcycles" but additionally:

   Motor: max. 1000 W
   Max. speed without pedalling 30 km/h (including mopeds with i.c. engines)
   Max. speed with pedalling: 45 km/h (S-pedelecs)
   Driving licence at least category M licence required
   Licence plate including liability insurance required
   Helmet required
   Speedometer required

"Heavy Motorbicycles" Including tricycles:

   Motor: max. 2000 W
   Max. speed with or without pedalling 25 km/h  (E-cargocycles)
   Total weight: 250 to 450 kg
   Driving licence at least category M licence required
   Licence plate including liability insurance required
   Helmet required

==== Turkey ====
Laws are similar to those in the EU.

==== United Kingdom ====
Laws were amended in 2015 to match much of the EU regulation detail, including a 250W power limit and 25 km/h speed limit. A minimum rider age of 14 years old applies.

== India ==
Indian law requires that all-electric vehicles have ARAI approval. Vehicles with below 250W and speed less than 25 km/h, do not require certification- hence not following full testing process, but needs to get an exemption report from ARAI. Whereas more powerful vehicles need to go through a full testing process following CMVR rules. This can take time and cost money but assures safe and reliable design for Electric Vehicles. These regulations are not promulgated by the Regional Transport offices, and riders are not required to obtain a license to drive, carry insurance, or wear a helmet. In India, all-electric cycles which do not require a licence and registration are made in accordance with the guidelines issued by ARAI.

== Israel ==
In Israel, persons above 16 years old are allowed to use pedal-assisted bicycles with power of up to 250 W and a speed limit of 25 km/h. The bicycle must satisfy the European Standard EN15194 and be approved by the Standards Institution of Israel. A new law, effective January 10, 2019, states that riders under 18 who have no automobile license will need a special permit. Otherwise, no license or insurance is required. Other motorized bicycles are considered to be motorcycles and should be licensed and insured as such. The maximum weight of the e-bike itself cannot exceed 30 kg.

The Israeli Ministry of Transportation passed legislation in 2009 and again in 2018. The 2018 law is effective from January 1, 2019, and regards a bicycle permit:

Israeli authorities passed legislation, as of December 2009, that allows electric bicycles to be legal for street use in the country under the following criteria:

1. The maximum power of the electric engine is not higher than 250W.
2. The electric motor is activated by the rider's pedalling effort and it has to cut out completely when the rider stops pedalling.
3. The electric motor power decreases with the advance of the bicycle speed and it must cut out completely whenever the bicycle reaches a speed of 25 km/h.
4. The electric bicycle has to comply with the European standard — BSEN 15194.

== Japan ==
In Japan, Electric-assisted bicycles are treated as human-powered bicycles, while bicycles capable of propulsion by electric power alone face additional registration and regulatory requirements as mopeds. Requirements include electric power generation by a motor that cannot be easily modified, along with a power assist mechanism that operates safely and smoothly. In December 2008, The assist ratio was updated as follows:

- Under 10 km/h; 2
- 10–24 km/h; 2-(Running speed - 10) / 7
- Over 24 km/h; 0

(See Moped#Individual countries/regions)

== New Zealand ==
In New Zealand, the regulations read: "AB (Power-assisted pedal cycle) A pedal cycle to which is attached one or more auxiliary propulsion motors having a combined maximum power output not exceeding 300 watts." This is explained by NZTA as "A power-assisted cycle is a cycle that has a motor of up to 300 watts. The law treats these as ordinary cycles rather than motorcycles. This means that it is not necessary to register or license them. Note that the phrase "maximum power output" that is found in the regulation (but omitted in the explanation) may create confusion because some e-bike motor manufacturers advertise and print on the motor their "maximum input power" because that number is larger (typically motors run at about 80% efficiency) thus give the impression the buyer is getting a more powerful motor. This can cause misunderstandings with law enforcement officers who do not necessarily understand the difference, and when stopping a rider on an e-bike in a traffic stop, look at the number on the motor to determine if the e-bike is legal or not.

Vehicles with electric power and power of less than 300 W are classified as "not a motor vehicle". Such electric bicycles must comply with the same rules as bicycles. You must wear a helmet even on a scooter or bike under 300 W. If the power is over 300 W or a combustion engine is used it is a "low -powered vehicle" and the moped rules apply. Specifically, a driver's license and registration are required.

== Philippines ==
In the Philippines, the Land Transportation Office issued Memorandum Circular 721-2006 stating that registration is not needed for electric bicycles (i.e. electric motor assisted bicycles with working pedals) and even extended the exemption to "bicycle-like" vehicles.

== Russian Federation ==
According to Russian law, bicycles can have electric motors with nominal output power of 250 watts or less which automatically turns itself off on speeds above 25 km/h. No driver's license is required.

== Comparison ==
Country/jurisdiction	Type of e-bike	Speed limit, km/h	mph	Watt limit	Weight limit, kg	Age requirement	Demands license plates	Allowed on bike paths	References & footnotes
Australia	pedelec	25 + 10%	15.5	250	none	none	no	yes	ACT NSW NT QLD SA Tas Vic WA
Australia	hand-throttle or pedal-assist (some states specifically ban hand-throttle e-bikes)	6 (only applies to pedelec with hand-throttle)	3.7	200	none	none	no	yes	ACT NSW NT QLD SA Tas Vic WA
Brazil	pedelec	32	20	1000	none	none	no	varies from municipal by-laws	
Canada	hand-throttle	32	20	500	none	various	no	varies from municipal by-laws	
China	both	25	15.5	400 (48 V rated, 60 V output)	63	16	no	yes	
European Union and Norway	pedelec	25 +10%	15.5	250	none	none	no	yes	
Germany	pedelec	25	15.5	250	none	none	no	yes	
Germany	s-pedelec	45	28	4000	none	16	insurance identifier plate	no	
Norway	speed pedelec	45	28	500	none	none	no	yes	
Hong Kong	none allowed	–	–	–	–	–	–	–	(**)
Indonesia	both	25	15.5	–	–	12	no	yes	
Israel	pedelec	25	15.5	250	30	16	no	yes	
Mexico	both	same as motorcycles	same as motorcycles	–	–	15+	yes	no	
New Zealand	pedelec	none	none	300	none	none	no	yes	
Taiwan	both	25	15.5	None	40	none	no	yes	
Turkey	pedelec	25	15.5	250	none	none	no	yes	
United Kingdom	pedelec	25	15.5	250	none	14	no	yes	
United States	hand-throttle	32	20	750	none	none	no	varies	see below

(*) Allowed on bike paths when electric systems are turned off
(**) E-bikes are illegal in this region

=== Comparison of US rules and regulations ===
- Identity: How exactly does legislation identify the electric bicycle?
- Type: How does the law define vehicle type?
- Max speed: Maximum speed when powered solely by the motor.
- Max power: Maximum motor power, or engine size, permitted.
- Helmet: Is use of a helmet mandatory?
- Minimum age: Operator's minimum age.
- Driver's license: Is a license or endorsement required for the driver?

State	Identity	Type	Max speed (mph)	Max power	Helmet	Min age	Driver's license
Alabama	Motor-driven cycle	Motorcycle	None	150 cc	Motorcycle helmet required	14	Yes, M class
Alaska	Motor-driven cycle	Motorcycle	None	50 cc		14	Yes, M class
Arizona	Motorized electric bicycle or tricycle	Bicycle	20	48 cc	No	None	No
Arkansas	electric bicycle	Bicycle	20 (Class III 28)	750 w	Yes for class III	16 for class III	No, as of 2017 HB-2185
California	Motorized Bicycle	Bicycle	20 (Class III 28)	750 W	Class dependent	Class dependent	No
Colorado	Electrical assisted bicycle	Bicycle	20	750 W	No	None	No
Connecticut	Bicycle with helper motor		30	2.0 bhp (1.5 kW) and <50 cc	yes	15	yes
Delaware	Bicycle	Bicycle	20	<750 watts	Under 16		
District of Columbia	Motorized bicycle		20		No	16	No
Florida	Electric-assist bicycle	Bicycle	20	None	No	16	No
Georgia	Electric bicycle	Bicycle	20	750 W	Under 16		no
Hawaii	Moped		30	2 hp	No	15	Yes
Idaho	Motorized Electric Bicycle	Bicycle	30	< 2 brake hp	No	16	Yes, class D & liability Ins.
Illinois	Low-speed electric bicycle	Bicycle	20 (Class III 28)	750 W	No	16 for Class III	No
Indiana	motorized bicycle		25		yes if under 18	15	ID card
Iowa	Electric Bicycle	Bicycle	<20, unless pedaling	<750 watts	No	None	No
Kansas	Electric with Pedal	Bicycle	<20,	1000 Watts	yes, under 18		No
Kentucky	Motorized bicycle	Moped	30	2.0 brake hp or 50 cc	yes, under 18	16	yes
Louisiana	motorized bicycle		25	1.5 brake hp or 50 cc	yes	15	yes
Maine	Electric Bicycle	Electric Bicycle	20 Class I & II, 28 Class III	750 Watts	yes, under 16	Minimum 16, for Class II & III	no
Maryland	Electric bicycle		20	750 watts	yes		no
Massachusetts	Electric Bicycle	Electric Bicycle	20	Class I & II 750 motor or less	no	16	No
Michigan	Electric bicycle, generally not allowed on Mackinac Island		20 Class I & II, 28 Class III	750 Watts	yes for class III	14 for Class 3	No
Minnesota	Electric-Assisted Bicycle		20	1000w	No	15	No
Mississippi	Bicycle with a motor attached	Bicycle	None	None	No	None	No
Missouri	Electric Bicycle	Bicycle	20 Class 1 and 2. 28 Class 3	750W or 50cc		16 for Class 3	No
Montana	Bicycle	Bicycle Definition 61-8-102(2)(g)	20	--	Yes, under 18(?), and under 16 in some cities		No, mopeds and bicycles do not require driver's license
Nebraska	Moped	Motorized Bicycle with Pedals	30	50cc or 2 bhp, whichever is less	Yes		Yes
Nevada	Electric Bicycle (NRS 482.0287)	Bicycle	20 (motor only on the flat with 170LB rider, undefined if pedal assist is allowed to go faster)	750W (it is undefined as to whether this is input or output power, but in the US, motors are rated on output power at the shaft)	No	none (use caution here because of "reckless endangerment" laws)	no (not a "motor vehicle")
New Hampshire	Low-Speed Electric Bicycle	Bicycle	20	750 watts	Required Under 16	14	no
New Jersey	motorized bicycle	moped	25	50 cc 1.5 brake hp	motorcycle helmet	15	yes
New Mexico	Motorized Bicycle	Bicycle			Under 18		no
New York	Illegal, except "non-throttle controlled" 20 mph e-bikes in NYC, NY as of July 2018						
North Carolina	Electric Assisted Bicycle	Bicycle	20	750 W	Under 16		No
North Dakota	motorized bicycle	motorcycle	2 brake hp	30	yes, under 18	14	yes
Ohio	Motorized bicycle	Bicycle	20	1 bhp (750 W) or 50cc		18 for class III	No
Oklahoma	Electric-Assisted Bicycle	Bicycle	30	1000 W	Under 19	16	Unclear. Class A, B, C, or D
Oregon	Electric assisted bicycle	Bicycle	20	1000 W	Under 16	16	No
Pennsylvania	Pedalcycle with electric assist	Bicycle	20	750 W	No	16	No
Rhode Island	electric bicycle		25 (30 for motorized bicycle)	2 bhp (4.9 bhp for motorized bicycle)		16	no (yes, for motorized bicycle)
South Carolina	Electric-Assist Bicycle (H 3615)	Bicycle (16 C.F.R., Part 1512)	20	750 W	No	None	No
South Dakota		moped			yes, under 18		
Tennessee		750 W	20 mph, 28 mph for Class III		Yes, under 16 and all ages on Class III	14 for Class III	No
Texas	Electric bicycle	Bicycle	20(without pedaling)	750 watt	No	None	No
Utah	Electric bicycle	Bicycle	20	750Watt	No	8 (accompanied by parent/guardian), 14 (unaccompanied)	No
Vermont	Motor-assisted bicycle	Motor-assisted bicycle	20 on the flat	1000W or 1.3 hp	No	16	No
Virginia	Electric power-assisted bicycle	bicycle	25 mph	1000 W	Yes, under 16. Local cities or counties may require for everyone.	14 (any age if under the supervision of someone at least 18 years old)	No
Washington	electric-assisted bicycle	electric-assisted bicycle	28	750W	No	16, for class III	No
West Virginia	Electric Bicycle	Bicycle	20 mph, 28 mph for Class III	750 W	Yes, riders and passengers under age 15 on electric bicycles		No
Wisconsin	Electric Bicycle	Bicycle	20 mph, 28 mph for Class III	750 W		16, for class III	No
Wyoming		moped (Senate File 81 takes effect July 1, 2019 to redesignate into 3-class system of bicycles)	50cc (SF-81 changing to 750W)	30 mph (SF-81 changing to 20 mph & 28 mph for class III)			Yes (SF-81 changing to No)
State	Identity	Type	Max speed (mph)	Max power	Helmet	Min age	License

== United States ==
=== Federal laws and regulations on sales ===
The U.S. Consumer Product Safety Act states that electric bicycles and tricycles meeting the definition of low-speed electric bicycles will be considered consumer products. The Consumer Product Safety Commission (CPSC) has regulatory authority to assure, through guidelines and standards, that the public will be protected from unreasonable risks of injury or death associated with the use of electric bicycles.

In addition to federal and state electric bicycle regulations, people with certain mobility disabilities may be granted use of Class I and Class II electric bicycles per Title 28 Chapter 1 Part 36 at certain locations where electric bicycles are not normally permitted, so long as they can be used reasonably safely.

==== Defined ====
The federal Consumer Product Safety Act defines low-speed electric bicycle" as a two or three-wheeled vehicle with fully operable pedals, a top speed when powered solely by the motor under 20 mph (32 km/h) and an electric motor that produces less than 750 W (1.01 hp). The Act authorizes the Consumer Product Safety Commission to protect people who ride low-speed electric vehicles by issuing necessary safety regulations. The rules for e-bikes on public roads, sidewalks, and pathways are under state jurisdiction and vary.

In conformance with legislation adopted by the U.S. Congress defining this category of electric-power bicycle (15 U.S.C. 2085(b)), CPSC rules stipulate that low-speed electric bicycles (to include two- and three-wheel vehicles) are exempt from classification as motor vehicles providing they have fully operable pedals, an electric motor of less than 750 W (1.01 hp), and a top motor-powered speed of fewer than 20 miles per hour (32 kilometres per hour) when operated by a rider weighing 170 pounds. An electric bike remaining within these specifications is subject to the CPSC consumer product regulations for a bicycle. Commercially manufactured e-bikes exceeding these power and speed limits are regulated by the federal DOT and NHTSA as motor vehicles and must meet additional safety requirements. The legislation enacting this amendment to the CPSC is also known as HR 727. The text of HR 727 includes the statement: "This section shall supersede any State law or requirement concerning low-speed electric bicycles to the extent that such State law or requirement is more stringent than the Federal law or requirements." (Note that this refers to consumer product regulations enacted under the Consumer Product Safety Act. Preemption of more stringent state consumer product regulations does not limit State authority to regulate the use of electric bicycles, or bicycles in general, under state vehicle codes.)

=== State requirements for use ===
While Federal law governs consumer product regulations for "low-speed electric bicycles", as with motor vehicles and bicycles, regulation of how these products are used on public streets is subject to state vehicle codes. There is significant variation from state to state, as summarized below.

==== Alabama ====
Every bicycle with a motor attached is defined as a motor-driven cycle. The operation of a motor-driven cycle requires a class M driver license. Restricted class M driver licenses are available for those as young as 14 years of age.

==== Arizona ====
Under Arizona law, motorized electric bicycles and tricycles meeting the definition under the applicable statute are not subject to title, licensing, insurance, or registration requirements, and may be used upon any roadway authorized for use by conventional bicycles, including use in bike lanes integrated with motor vehicle roadways. Unless specifically prohibited, electric bicycles may be operated on multi-use trails designated for hiking, biking, equestrian, or other non-motorized use, and upon paths designated for the exclusive use of bicycles. No operator's license is required, but anyone operating a bicycle on Arizona roads must carry proof of identity. A "motorized electric bicycle or tricycle" is legally defined as a bicycle or tricycle that is equipped with a helper motor that may be self-propelled, which is operated at speeds of less than twenty miles per hour. Electric bicycles operated at speeds of twenty miles an hour or more, but less than twenty-five miles per hour may be registered for legal use on the roadways as mopeds, and above twenty-five miles per hour as a registered moped with an 'M' endorsement on the operator's driving license. However, mopeds in Arizona are prohibited from using bike lanes on motor vehicle roadways. The Arizona statute governing motorized electric bicycles does not prohibit local jurisdictions from adopting an ordinance that further regulates or prohibits the operation of motorized electric bicycles or tricycles.

==== Arkansas ====
Arkansas does not define E-bikes. The following definition describes a combustion engine. E-bikes being electric do not have a cylinder capacity and thus this law is not technically applicable. The state defines a "Motorized bicycle" as "a bicycle with an automatic transmission and a motor of less than 50cc." Riders require either a certificate to operate a motorized bicycle, a motorcycle license, a motor-driven cycle license, or a license of class A, B, C or D. Certificates cannot be issued to riders under 10 years of age.

==== California ====
Electric Bicycles are defined by the California Vehicle Code.

New legislation became effective January 2016. The current regulations define an "electric bicycle", a bicycle equipped with fully operable pedals and an electric motor of less than 750 watts, separated into three classes:

A "class 1 electric bicycle," or "low-speed pedal-assisted electric bicycle," is a bicycle equipped with a motor that provides assistance only when the rider is pedaling, and that ceases to provide assistance when the bicycle reaches the speed of 20 miles per hour. (2) A "class 2 electric bicycle," or "low-speed throttle-assisted electric bicycle," is a bicycle equipped with a motor that may be used exclusively to propel the bicycle, and that is not capable of providing assistance when the bicycle reaches the speed of 20 miles per hour. A "class 3 electric bicycle," or "speed pedal-assisted electric bicycle," is a bicycle equipped with a motor that provides assistance only when the rider is pedaling, and that ceases to provide assistance when the bicycle reaches the speed of 28 miles per hour, and equipped with a speedometer. Local government ordinances are allowed to permit or ban any class of electric bicycles on dedicated bicycle paths and trails, with Class 1 & 2 permitted, and Class 3 banned, by default.

Beginning January 1, 2017, manufacturers and distributors of electric bicycles will be required to apply a label that is permanently affixed, in a prominent location, to each electric bicycle, indicating its class. Should a user "tamper with or modify" an electric bicycle, changing the speed capability, they must replace the label indicating the classification.

Driver's licenses, registration, insurance and license plate requirements do not apply. An electric bicycle is not a motor vehicle. Drinking and driving laws apply. Additional laws or ordinances may apply to the use of electric bicycles by each city or county.

==== Colorado ====
Ebike definition in Colorado follows the HR 727 National Law: 20 mph (30 km/h) e-power and 750 W (1 hp) max, 2 or 3 wheels, pedals that work. Legal low-powered ebikes are allowed on roads and bike lanes, and prohibited from using their motors on bike and pedestrian paths, unless overridden by local ordinance. The city of Boulder is the first to have done so, banning ebikes over 400W from bike lanes. Bicycles and Ebikes are disallowed on certain high speed highways and all Interstates unless signed as "Allowed" in certain rural Interstate stretches where the Interstate is the ONLY means of travel.

==== Connecticut ====
Section 14-1 of Connecticut state law classifies electric bicycles as "motor-driven cycles" if they have a seat height of not less than 26 inches and a motor which produces brake horsepower of 2 or less.

Motor-driven cycles may be operated on the roadway without registration, but the operator must have a driver's license. The cycle may not be operated on any sidewalk, limited access highway or turnpike. If the maximum speed of the cycle is less than the speed limit of the road, the cycle must operate in the right hand lane available for traffic or upon a usable shoulder on the right side of the road unless the operator is making a left turn.

==== District of Columbia ====
Electric-assist and other "motorized bicycles" do not need to be inspected, do not require a license, and do not require registration. The vehicle must meet all of the following criteria: a post mounted seat for each person it is designed to carry, two or three wheels which contact the ground, fully operative pedals, wheels at least 16 inches in diameter and a motor not capable of propelling the device at more than 20 mph on level ground. The driver does not need a license, but must be at least 16 years old. DC law prohibits motorized bicycles from traveling anywhere on the sidewalk or in the bike lanes. DC Regulation 18–1201.18 provides: "Except as otherwise permitted for a motor vehicle, no person shall operate a motorized bicycle on any sidewalk or any off-street bikepath or bicycle route within the District. This prohibition shall apply even though the motorized bicycle is being operated solely by human power." So, if cars are prohibited in a particular place, motor-assisted bikes are also prohibited.

==== Florida ====
Florida DMV Procedure RS-61 II. "(B.) Dirt bikes noted for off road use, motorized bicycles and Go-Peds are not registered."

Electric Helper-Motor Bicycles
If you are at least 16 years old, a person may ride a bicycle that is propelled by a combination of human power (pedals) and an electric helper-motor that cannot go faster than 20 mph on level ground without a driver license.

Motorized Bicycles and Motorized Scooters
Under Title 23, Chapter 316 of the code, bicycles and motorized bicycles are defined as follows: Bicycle—Every vehicle propelled solely by human power, and every motorized bicycle propelled by a combination of human power and an electric helper motor capable of propelling the vehicle at a speed of not more than 20 miles per hour on level ground upon which any person may ride, having two tandem wheels, and including any device generally recognized as a bicycle though equipped with two front or two rear wheels. The term does not include such a vehicle with a seat height of no more than 25 inches from the ground when the seat is adjusted to its highest position or a scooter or similar device. No person under the age of 16 may operate or ride upon a motorized bicycle. Motorized Scooter—Any vehicle not having a seat or saddle for the use of the rider, designed to travel on not more than three wheels, and not capable of propelling the vehicle at a speed greater than 30 miles per hour on level ground.

In addition to the statutory language, there are several judicial rulings on the subject.

==== Georgia ====
Georgia Code 40-1-1 Part 15.3

(15.3)"Electric assisted bicycle" means a device with two or three wheels which has a saddle and fully operative pedals for human propulsion and also has an electric motor having a power output of not more than 750 watts.

==== Hawaii ====
A Federal agency, the Consumer Product Safety Commission (CPSC), has exclusive jurisdiction over electric bicycles as to consumer product regulations, but this does not change state regulation of the use of electric bicycles on streets and highways.

"Bicycle" means every vehicle "propelled solely by human power" upon which any person may ride, having two tandem wheels, and including any vehicle generally recognized as a bicycle though equipped with two front or two rear wheels except a toy bicycle.

Now (by update on September 20, 2019), the DOT of HI STATE has announced the normalization of electric bicycles on city roads (registration fee of $30) under HB.812 (- any 2-3 wheel electric bikes with a DC motor below or up to 750W is qualified to be a bicycle; minimal age to ride an e-bike is 15). HB.812 was passed in both House and Senate floors in March 2019, and it was signed to be effect by Governor David Ige in July 2019.

"Moped" means a device upon which a person may ride which is DOT Approved.

Under the statute, mopeds must be registered. To be registered under Hawaii law a moped must bear a certification label from the manufacturer stating that it complies with federal motor vehicle safety standards (FMVSS). A moped must also possess the following equipment approved by the D.O.T. under Chapter 91: approved braking, fuel, and exhaust system components; approved steering system and handlebars; wheel rims; fenders; a guard or protective covering for drive belts, chains and rotating components; seat or saddle; lamps and reflectors; equipment controls; speedometer; retracting support stand; horn; and identification markings.

==== Illinois ====
Two relevant laws for Illinois are 625 ILCS 5/11-1517 & 625 ILCS 5/1-140.10.

625 ILCS 5/11-1517

Each low-speed electric bicycle operating in Illinois should comply with requirements adopted by the United States Consumer Product Safety Commission under 16 CFR 1512. Class 3 low-speed electric bicycle need an accurate speedometer in miles per hour. After January 1, 2018, every manufacturer and distributor of low-speed electric bicycles needs a permanent and prominent label on the bicycle detailing:

(1) the classification number for the bicycle from 625 ILCS 5/1-140.10

(2) the bicycle's top assisted speed

(3) the bicycle's motor wattage

in Arial font in at least 9-point type.

No person shall knowingly tamper or modify the speed capability or engagement of a low-speed electric bicycle without replacing the original label with accurate class, assisted top speed and motor wattage.

A Class 2 low-speed electric bicycle's electric motor should disengage or cease to function when the brakes are applied. For Class 1 and Class 3 low-speed electric bicycles, the electric motor should disengage or cease to function when the rider stops pedaling.

Low-speed electric bicycle can go on any highway, street, or roadway authorized for use by bicycles, including, but not limited to, bicycle lanes.

A municipality, county, or local authority with jurisdiction can prohibit the use of low-speed electric bicycles or a specific class of low-speed electric bicycles on a bicycle path. Otherwise, low-speed electric bicycles are allowed on a bicycle path.

Low-speed electric bicycle cannot go on a sidewalk.

Class 3 low-speed electric bicycle drivers need to be 16 years or older. If the Class 3 low-speed electric bicycle is designed to accommodate passengers, there are no age restrictions on passengers.

Low-speed electric bicycle & class is defined by 625 ILCS 5/1-140.10.

A "low-speed electric bicycle" is not a moped or a motor driven cycle.

All "low-speed electric bicycle"s must have fully operable pedals and an electric motor of less than 750 watts. Furthermore, they must qualify as a class 1,2 or 3.

Class 1 low-speed electric bicycles have a motor that provides assistance only when the rider is pedaling and does not assist over 20 miles per hour.

Class 2 low-speed electric bicycles have a motor that can exclusively to propel the bicycle and does not assist over 20 miles per hour.

Class 3 low-speed electric bicycles have a motor that provides assistance only when the rider is pedaling and that ceases to provide assistance when the bicycle reaches a speed of 28 miles per hour.

==== Indiana ====
In Indiana, the law for E-bikes was changed and now E-bikes are regulated like bicycles. The same rules of the road apply to both e-bikes and what we historically think of as bicycles (i.e. human powered). During the 2019 update to the Indiana Code of Motor Vehicles, E-bikes were put in three classes.

==== Iowa ====
In 2006 a bill was passed that changed the definition of a bicycle to include a bicycle that has an electric motor of less than 1 hp (750 watts). The new definition, found in Iowa Code section 321.1(40)c states:

"Bicycle" means either of the following: (1) A device having two wheels and having at least one saddle or seat for the use of a rider which is propelled by human power. (2) A device having two or three wheels with fully operable pedals and an electric motor of less than 750 watts (one horsepower), whose maximum speed on a paved level surface, when powered solely by such a motor while ridden, is less than 20 miles per hour.

==== Kentucky ====
Electric bicycle fits under the definition of "moped" under Kentucky law. No tag or insurance is required, but a driver's license is required. "Moped" means either a motorized bicycle whose frame design may include one (1) or more horizontal crossbars supporting a fuel tank so long as it also has pedals, or a motorized bicycle with a step-through type frame which may or may not have pedals rated no more than two (2) brake horsepower, a cylinder capacity not exceeding fifty (50) cubic centimeters, an automatic transmission not requiring clutching or shifting by the operator after the drive system is engaged, and capable of a maximum speed of not more than thirty (30) miles per hour Helmets are required.

==== Louisiana ====
Louisiana Revised Statute R.S. 32:1(41) defines a motorized bicycle as a pedal bicycle which may be propelled by human power or helper motor, or by both, with a motor rated no more than one and one-half brake horsepower, a cylinder capacity not exceeding fifty cubic centimeters, an automatic transmission, and which produces a maximum design speed of no more than twenty-five miles per hour on a flat surface. Motorized bicycles falling within this definition must be registered and titled under Louisiana law. Additionally, a motorized bicycle operated upon Louisiana roadways or highways by a person fifteen years of age or older and producing more than five horsepower must possess a valid driver's license with a motorcycle endorsement and adhere to laws governing the operation of a motorcycle, including the wearing of approved eye protectors or a windshield and the wearing of a helmet. The statute also states that "Motorized bicycles such as pocket bikes and scooters that do not meet the requirements of this policy shall not be registered."

As R.S. 32:1(41) refers to motorized bicycles using "an automatic transmission" with helper motors rated in horsepower and cylinder capacity, not by watts or volts, the statute arguably does not cover bicycles powered by an electric motor(s), whether self-propelled or pedal-assist designs.

==== Maryland ====
Maryland defines an "electric bicycle" as a vehicle that (1) is designed to be operated by human power with the assistance of an electric motor, (2) is equipped with fully operable pedals, (3) has two or three wheels, (4) has a motor with a rating of 500 watts or less, (5) and is capable of a maximum speed of 20 miles per hour on a level surface when powered by the motor. (Senate Bill 379, approved by the Governor 5/5/2014, Chapter 294.) This legislation excludes "electric bicycle" from the definition of "moped", "motorized minibike", and "motor vehicle", and removes the titling and insurance requirements required for electric bicycles under prior Maryland law.

Before September 20, 2014, Maryland law had classified an electric bicycle as a moped. Mopeds are specifically excluded from the definition of "motor vehicle" per § 11-135 of the Maryland Transportation Code. Mopeds may not be operated sidewalks, trails, roadways with posted speeds in excess of 50 mph, or limited-access highways.

Standard requirements for bicycle lighting, acceptable bicycle parking locations, and prohibitions on wearing earplugs or headsets over both ears apply.

Recent legislation has passed putting Maryland ebike laws in line with the popular class 1,2,3 systems previously implemented in states such as California. This legislation becomes effective October 2019. The most significant portion of this change is the increased max limit on power and speed. It will be increased from a max of 500w / 20 mph to 750w / 28 mph (assuming the ebike in question meets class 3 criteria)

==== Massachusetts ====
Massachusetts has the following two definitions for electric bicycles since November 8, 2022:

- Class I electric bicycle: Bicycle equipped with a motor that provides assistance only when the rider is pedaling, and that ceases to provide assistance when the electric bicycle reaches 20 mph, with an electric motor of 750 watts or less.
- Class II electric bicycle: Bicycle equipped with a throttle-actuated motor that ceases to provide assistance when the electric bicycle reaches 20 mph, with an electric motor of 750 watts or less.

Riders of these electric bicycles do not require a license and are afforded all the rights and privileges related to all bicycle riders except as noted: These electric bicycles are allowed most places traditional bicycles are allowed: roadways, bike lanes, bike paths, paved trails, and if specifically allowed by local jurisdiction and signage, natural surface trails. Electric bicycles are prohibited from sidewalks and most natural surface trails. Local jurisdictions may prohibit the use of electric bicycles on bikeways and bike paths, but this first requires a public notice, public hearing, and posted signage prohibiting electric bicycles. Manufacturers and distributors of electric bicycles must apply a prominent fixed label specifying the classification number, top assisted speed, and motor wattage. Persons who modify the motor-powered speed capability or engagement of the electric bicycle must appropriately replace this label.

Massachusetts does not explicitly use the Federal definition of Class III, 28 mph pedal assist e-bikes. Massachusetts General Laws defines other classes of motorized two-wheeled vehicles that are not Class I or Class II electric bicycles: Motorcycle, Motorized bicycle, and Motorized scooter. Although the definition of motorized scooter includes two-wheeled vehicles propelled by electric motors with or without human power, motorized scooter specifically excludes anything which falls under the definitions of Class I or Class II electric bicycles, motorized bicycle, and motorcycle. Motorized bicycle is a pedal bicycle which has a helper motor, or a non-pedal bicycle which has a motor, with a cylinder capacity not exceeding fifty cubic centimeters, an automatic transmission, which is capable of a maximum speed of no more than thirty miles per hour, and does not fall under the specific definition of a Class I or Class II electric bicycles. Motorcycle includes any bicycle with a motor or driving wheel attached, with the exception of vehicles that fall under the specific definition of motorized bicycle. Thus, a pedal bicycle with an electric motor or a non-pedal bicycle with an electric motor, automatic transmission, maximum speed of 30 miles an hour, and not a Class I or Class II electric bicycle, would fall under the definition of motorized bicycle. A non-Class I or II electric bicycle that did not meet those restrictions would be either a motorized scooter or motorcycle, depending on specific characteristics.

A motorized bicycle cannot be operated by any person under sixteen years of age. Motorized bicycles also cannot be driven at a speed exceeding twenty-five Miles per Hour within the commonwealth, and they are explicitly prohibited from being driven on public highways, public walkways or other public land as designated by the parks department. A motorized bicycle cannot be operated by any person not possessing a valid driver's license or learner's permit. Every person operating a motorized bicycle upon has the right to use all public ways in the commonwealth except limited access or express state highways where signs specifically prohibiting bicycles have been posted, and are subject to the traffic laws and regulations of the commonwealth. Motorized bicycles may be operated on bicycle lanes adjacent to the various ways, but are excluded from off-street recreational bicycle paths. Every person operating a motorized bicycle or riding as a passenger on a motorized bicycle must wear protective headgear, and no person operating a motorized bicycle can permit any other person to ride a passenger on such motorized bicycle unless such passenger is wearing such protective headgear.

==== Michigan ====
An electric bicycle (or e-bike) is a bicycle that has a small rechargeable electric motor that can give a boost to the pedaling rider or can take over pedaling completely. To qualify as an e- bike in Michigan, the bike must meet the following requirements:

It must have a seat or saddle for the rider to sit. There must be fully operational pedals. It must have an electric motor of no more than 750 watts (or 1 horsepower). Whether you can ride an e-bicycle on a trail depends on several factors, including the e-bike's class, the type of trail and whether the authority that manages or oversees the trail allows the use. To learn more, read the full legislation or review the provided summary.

==== Minnesota ====
Electric-assisted bicycles, also referred to as "e-bikes", are a subset of bicycles that are equipped with a small attached motor. To be classified as an "electric-assisted bicycle" in Minnesota, the bicycle must have a saddle and operable pedals, two or three wheels, and an electric motor of up to 750 watts, as well as meet certain federal motor vehicle safety standards. The motor must disengage during braking and have a maximum speed of 20 miles per hour (whether assisted by human power or not). Minn. Stat. §169.011, subd. 27.

Legislative changes in 2012 significantly altered the classification and regulatory structure for e-bikes. The general effect was to establish electric-assisted bicycles as a subset of bicycles and regulate e-bikes in roughly the same manner as bicycles instead of other motorized devices with two (or three) wheels. Laws 2012, ch. 287, art. 3, §§ 15–17, 21, 23–26, 30, 32–33, and 41. The 2012 Legislature also modified and clarified regulation of e-bikes on bike paths and trails. Laws 2012, ch. 287, art. 4, §§ 1–4, 20.

Following the 2012 change, electric-assisted bicycles are regulated similarly to other bicycles. Most of the same laws apply. Minn. Stat. § §169.011, subd. 27; 169.222.

The bicycle does not need to be registered, and a title is no longer necessary. Minn. Stat. §§ 168.012, subd. 2d;168A.03, subd. 1 clause(11)

A license plate is no longer required to be displayed on the rear. See Minn. Stat. § 169.79, subd. 3. It is not subject to motor vehicle sales tax (the general sales tax would instead be owed on e-bike purchases).

A driver's license or permit is not required. Unlike a non-powered bicycle, the minimum operator age is 15 years old. Minn. Stat. § 169.222, subd. 6a.

The device does not need to be insured. See Minn. Stat. § 65B.43, subds. 2, 13.

Electric-assisted bicycle operators must follow the same traffic laws as operators of motor vehicles (except those that by their nature would not be relevant). The bicycles may be operated two abreast. Operators must generally ride as close as is practical to the right-hand side of the road (exceptions include when overtaking another vehicle, preparing for a left turn, and to avoid unsafe conditions). The bicycle must be ridden within a single lane. Travel on the shoulder of a road must be in the same direction as the direction of adjacent traffic.

Some prohibitions also apply, such as on: carrying cargo that prevents keeping at least one hand on the handlebars or prevents proper use of brakes, riding no more than two abreast on a roadway or shoulder, and attaching the bicycle to another vehicle. Minn. Stat. § 169.222, subds. 3–5. The vehicles may be operated on a sidewalk except in a business district or when prohibited by a local unit of government, and must yield to pedestrians on the sidewalk. Minn. Stat. § 169.223, subd. 3. By default, electric-assisted bicycles are allowed on road shoulders as well as on bicycle trails, bicycle paths, and bicycle lanes.

A local unit of government having jurisdiction over a road or bikeway (including the Department of Natural Resources in the case of state bike trails) is authorized to restrict e-bike use if: the use is not consistent with the safety or general welfare of others; or the restriction is necessary to meet the terms of any legal agreements concerning the land on which a bikeway has been established.

Electric-assisted bicycles can be parked on a sidewalk unless restricted by local government (although they cannot impede normal movement of pedestrians) and can be parked on streets where parking of other motor vehicles is allowed. Minn. Stat. § 169.222, subd. 9.

During nighttime operation, the bicycle must be equipped with a front headlamp, a rear-facing red reflector, and reflectors on the front and rear of pedals, and the bicycle or rider must have reflective surfaces on each side. Minn. Stat. §169.222, subd. 6. An electric-assisted bicycle can be equipped with a front-facing headlamp that emits a flashing white light, a rear-facing lamp that has a flashing red light, or both. The bicycle can carry studded tires designed for traction (such as in snowy or icy conditions).

Helmets are no longer required for e-bike use.

==== Mississippi ====
In Opinion No. 2007-00602 of the Attorney General, Jim Hood clarified that a "bicycle with a motor attached" does not satisfy the definition of "motor vehicle" under Section 63-3-103. He stated that it is up to the authority creating the bike lane to determine if a bicycle with a motor attached can be ridden in bike lanes. No specifications about the motor were made.

In Opinion No. 2011-00095 of the Attorney General, Jim Hood stated that an operator's license, helmet, safety insurance, title, registration, and safety inspection are all not required of bicycles with a motor attached.

==== Missouri ====
The rights and privileges of electric bicycle riders can be found in 307.194 RSMo. Generally, electric bicycle riders have all the rights and responsibilities as riders of bicycles. Electric bicycles are not subject to all laws covering motor vehicles meaning they do not require "vehicle registration, certificates of title, drivers' licenses, [or] financial responsibility."

Electric bicycles are divided into 3 different classes under 301.010(15), RSMo. Class 1 includes electric bicycles with a motor that assists the rider when pedaling and cases at 20 mph. Class 2 includes electric bicycles that use a motor to propel the bicycle instead of a rider pedaling and "is not capable of providing assistance" when the bicycle reaches 20 mph. Class 3 includes electric bicycles with a motor that provides assistance when the rider is pedaling and stops when the bicycle reaches 28 mph.

Persons under the age of 16 are not permitted to operate class 3 electric bicycles.

In 2022, the Missouri Department of Conservation expanded the areas where bicycles, includes electric bicycles, are allowed to be used.

==== Montana ====
The law uses a three-part definition where the first two parts describe a human-powered bicycle and one with an independent power source respectively, while the third describes a "moped" with both a motor and pedal assist. (Montana Code 61-8-102). As of April 21, 2015, mopeds were reclassified to be treated as bicycles in Montana, not requiring a driver's license.

61-8-102.(2)(b) "Bicycle" means:

(i) a vehicle propelled solely by human power on which any person may ride, irrespective of the number of wheels, except scooters, wheelchairs, and similar devices; or

(ii) a vehicle on which a person may ride that has two tandem wheels and an electric motor capable of propelling the vehicle and a rider who weighs 170 pounds no faster than 20 miles an hour on a paved, level surface.

61-8-102.(2)(n) "Moped" means: a vehicle equipped with two or three wheels, foot pedals to permit muscular propulsion, and an independent power source providing a maximum of 2 brake horsepower. The power source may not be capable of propelling the device, unassisted, at a speed exceeding 30 miles an hour on a level surface. The device must be equipped with a power drive system that functions directly or automatically only and does not require clutching or shifting by the operator after the drive system is engaged.

The definition as written does not define the power of the motor in Watts as is conventionally done for electric bicycles, but rather in brake horsepower. Thus for an electric bicycle, motor kit, or electric bicycle motor that is not rated by the manufacture in brake horsepower, but rather in Watts, a conversion must be made in the units a conversion which is not given in the code of the law and thus the court will have to consider a factor of conversion that is not directly encoded in the law. Industry standard conversion for Watts to horsepower for electric motors is 1 horsepower = 746 watts. Acceptance of that conversion factor from industry, however, as interpretation of the law is subject to the process of the courts since it is not defined specifically in the law.

In addition the specific wording of the law may or may not prohibit the use of a "mid-drive" or "crank-drive" motor set-up where the motor drives the rear wheel of the bicycle through the existing chain drive of a bicycle that has multiple gears depending on several points of interpretation of the law. Specifically the interpretation of the wording, "does not require clutching or shifting by the operator after the drive system is engaged". A "mid-drive" or "crank-drive" motor set-up on an electric bicycle does indeed allow the operator to change gears in the power drive system between the motor and the rear wheel of the bicycle. Whether or not such a mechanism which allows the operator to change gears satisfies the wording that requires the operator to change gears is a matter of legal interpretation by the courts. Just as "shall issue" and "may issue" (as in laws governing the issuing licenses) in application of the law have two different meanings (in the first case if you meet the requirements they have to give you the license and in the second they do not have to if they decide not to even if you meet the requirements for the license) whether or not "does not require shifting" outlaws electric bicycles where shifting is possible but is not necessarily required is a matter of interpretation. Thus the legality of electric bicycles equipped with a "mid-drive" or "crank-drive" motor set-up in the U.S. state of Montana is not clearly defined.

==== Nebraska ====
Nebraska defines a Moped as "a bicycle with fully operative pedals for propulsion by human power, an automatic transmission, and a motor with a cylinder capacity not exceeding fifty cubic centimeters which produces no more than two brake horsepower and is capable of propelling the bicycle at a maximum design speed of no more than thirty miles per hour on level ground."

However, under a bill passed February 20, 2015 electric bicycles are explicitly defined.

Bicycle shall mean (1) every device propelled solely by human power, upon which any person may ride, and having two tandem wheels either of which is more than fourteen inches in diameter or (2) a device with two or three wheels, fully operative pedals for propulsion by human power, and an electric motor with a capacity not exceeding seven hundred fifty watts which produces no more than one brake horsepower and is capable of propelling the bicycle at a maximum design speed of no more than twenty miles per hour on level ground.

==== Nevada ====
As of May 19, 2009, Nevada amended its state transportation laws to explicitly permit electric bicycles to use any "trail or pedestrian walkway" intended for use with bicycles and constructed with federal funding, and otherwise generally permits electric bicycles to be operated in cases where a regular bicycle could be. An electric bicycle is defined as a two- or three-wheeled vehicle with fully operable pedals with an electric motor producing up to 1 gross brake horsepower and up to 750 watts final output, and with a maximum speed of up to 20 miles per hour on flat ground with a 170-pound (77 kg) rider when powered only by that engine.

==== New Jersey ====
As of May 14, 2019, a new vehicle class ("Low-speed electric bicycle") was added to NJRS Title 39, described as "a two or three-wheeled vehicle with fully operable pedals and an electric motor of less than 750 watts, whose maximum speed on a paved level surface, when powered solely by a motor, while operated by a person weighing 170 pounds (77 kg), is less than 20 miles per hour (32 kilometres per hour)." Additionally, the existing class of "motorized bicycles" has been expanded to include—in addition to gas-powered vehicles such as mopeds—electric bicycles that can achieve speeds between 20 and 28 mph (32 and 45 km/h). For these vehicles, a driver's license and registration are still required.

Under previous regulations, all e-bikes were classified as motorized bicycles (mopeds) and required registration, but could not actually be registered since the law was written only for gas-powered vehicles. The new legislation, which applies to both "pedal-assist" and "throttle" bicycles, removes e-bikes from that legal gray area.

==== New Mexico ====
New Mexico has no specific laws concerning electric or motorized bicycles. MVD rules treat motorized bicycles the same as bicycles, requiring no registration or drivers license.

Prior to this clarification by the MVD, electric bicycles were often treated as mopeds, which require a standard drivers license, but no registration.

==== New York ====
New York State (NYS) included "motor-assisted bicycles" in its list of vehicles which cannot be registered. A Federal agency, the Consumer Product Safety Commission (CPSC), has exclusive jurisdiction over electric bicycles as to consumer product regulations.

Despite the illegal status in the state of New York until 2020, enforcement varies at the local level. New York City enforces the bike ban with fines and vehicle confiscation for throttle activated electric bikes. However, Mayor Bill de Blasio has changed the city's policy to legalize pedal-assist electric bikes that have a maximum speed limited to 20 mph. Contrarily, Tompkins County supports electric bike use, even providing grant money to fund electric bike share/rental projects.

Several bills were sponsored to legalize electric bicycles for use on NYS roads, and several passed overwhelmingly at the committee level, but none of these initiatives was able to be heard and then passed in the New York State Senate, until 2015. Bill S3997, "An act to amend the vehicle and traffic law, in relation to the definition of electric assisted bicycle. Clarifying the vehicle and traffic law to define electric assisted bicycles; establish that electric assisted bicycles, as defined, are bicycles, not motor vehicles; and establish safety and operational criteria for their use." passed in the Senate in 2015. The related Assembly bill A233 was not brought to a vote in the assembly even though it had passed with little issue in prior years. A legalization bill passed in 2019 was vetoed by the Governor.

The New York Bicycle Coalition has supported efforts to define electric bicycles in New York State New York City has repeatedly drawn media attention for its enforcement of a ban on electric bicycles in certain neighborhoods, with fines of up to $3,000. A law was passed in April 2020 defining and legalizing three classes of electric bicycle. In September 2023, additional regulations were introduced in New York City to restrict the sale of electric bicycles and other battery-powered mobility devices to only those that are UL certified.

==== Ohio ====
The Ohio Revised Code 4511.01 distinguishes motorized bicycles and mopeds from motorcycles or scooters by describing them as "...any vehicle having either two tandem wheels or one wheel in the front and two wheels in the rear, that is capable of being pedaled and is equipped with a helper motor of not more than fifty cubic centimeters piston displacement that produces no more than one brake horsepower and is capable of propelling the vehicle at a speed of no greater than twenty miles per hour on a level surface." One brake horsepower converts to 0.75 kW, or (rounded) 750W. Thus, a bicycle with an electric helper motor operating under 750W, and not propelling the bicycle over 20 mph, does not qualify to be registered under Ohio state law. Local jurisdictions may have other regulations.

==== Oklahoma ====
Oklahoma defines an Electric-Assisted Bicycle in 47 O.S. 1-104 as "Two or three wheels; and Fully operative pedals for human propulsion and equipped with an electric motor with a power output not to exceed one thousand (1,000) watts, incapable of propelling the device at a speed of more than thirty (30) miles per hour on level ground, and incapable of further increasing the speed of the device when human power alone is used to propel the device at a speed of thirty (30) miles per hour or more. An electric-assisted bicycle shall meet the requirements of the Federal Motor Vehicle Safety Standards as set forth in federal regulations and shall operate in such a manner that the electric motor disengages or ceases to function when the brakes are applied."

Oklahoma the following restrictions on the operation of Electric-Assisted Bicycle in 47 O.S. 11-805.2 as follows: 1. Possess a Class A, B, C or D license, but shall be exempt from a motorcycle endorsement; 2. Not be subject to motor vehicle liability insurance requirements only as they pertain to the operation of electric-assisted bicycles; 3. Be authorized to operate an electric-assisted bicycle wherever bicycles are authorized to be operated; 4. Be prohibited from operating an electric-assisted bicycle wherever bicycles are prohibited from operating; and 5. Wear a properly fitted and fastened bicycle helmet which meets the standards of the American National Standards Institute or the Snell Memorial Foundation Standards for protective headgear for use in bicycling, provided such operator is eighteen (18) years of age or less.

==== Oregon ====
Oregon Law (ORS 801.258]) defines an electric assisted bicycle as an electric motor-driven vehicle equipped with operable pedals, a seat or saddle for the rider, no more than three wheels in contact during travel. In addition, the vehicle must be equipped with an electric motor that is capable of applying a power output of no greater than 1,000 watts, and that is incapable of propelling the vehicle at a speed greater than 20 miles per hour on level ground.

In general, electric bicycles are considered "bicycles", rather than motor vehicles, for purposes of the code. This implies that all bicycle regulations apply to electric bicycles including operation in bike lanes. Exceptions to this include a restriction of operation on sidewalks and that a license or permit is required if the rider is younger than 17 years of age.

==== Pennsylvania ====
State law defines a motorized pedalcycle as a motor-driven cycle equipped with operable pedals, a motor rated at no more than 1.5 brake horsepower, a cylinder capacity not exceeding 50 cubic centimeters, an automatic transmission, and a maximum design speed of no more than 25 miles per hour. Subchapter J of Publication 45 spells out the vehicle requirements in full.

As of 2008 a standard class C license, proof of insurance, and registration (annual fee: $9.00) are required for operation of any motorized pedalcycle in Pennsylvania. Additionally, there are strict equipment standards that must be met for operation, including: handlebars, brakes, tires/wheels, electrical systems/lighting, mirrors, speedometer, and horns/warning devices.

The definition was clearly written with gasoline-powered pedalcycles in mind. The requirement of an automatic transmission is troublesome for those who just want to add an electric-assist motor to a bicycle, for almost all bicycles have transmissions consisting of chains and manually shifted sprockets. The registration form asks for a VIN, making it difficult to register some foreign-made ebikes. The fine for riding an unregistered electric bike is approximately $160.00 per event as of 2007.

On February 4, 2014, SB997 was introduced by Senator Matt Smith, which seeks to amend PA Vehicle Code to include "Pedalcycle with Electric Assist". In a memo addressed to all senate members, Smith said the definition shall include "bicycles equipped with an electric motor not exceeding 750 watts, weighing not more than 100 pounds (45 kg), are capable of a maximum speed of not more than 20 mph (32 km/h), and have operable pedals."

On October 22, 2014, PA house bill 573 passed into law as Act 154, which changes the definition of "pedalcycle" (bicycle) in the PA state vehicle code. "Pedalcycle" is now defined as a vehicle propelled solely by human-powered pedals or a "pedalcycle" (bicycle) with electric assist (a vehicle weighing not more than 100 pounds (45 kg) with two or three wheels more than 11 inches (28 cm) in diameter, manufactured or assembled with an electric motor rated at no more than 750 watts, equipped with operational pedals, with a maximum speed of 20 mph). Pedal-assisted bicycles meeting this definition may be used without regulation in PA.

==== Tennessee ====
Electric Bicycles are defined in Tennessee Code Annotated 55-8-301 – 307

This legislation passed in 2016 and defines an "electric bicycle", as a bicycle or tricycle equipped with fully operable pedals and an electric motor of less than 750 watts, separated into three classes:

(1) A "class 1 electric bicycle," or "low-speed pedal-assisted electric bicycle," is a bicycle equipped with a motor that provides assistance only when the rider is pedaling, and that ceases to provide assistance when the bicycle reaches the speed of 20 miles per hour.

(2) A "class 2 electric bicycle," or "low-speed throttle-assisted electric bicycle," is a bicycle equipped with a motor that may be used exclusively to propel the bicycle, and that is not capable of providing assistance when the bicycle reaches the speed of 20 miles per hour.

(3) A "class 3 electric bicycle," or "speed pedal-assisted electric bicycle," is a bicycle equipped with a motor that provides assistance only when the rider is pedaling, (no throttle) and that ceases to provide assistance when the bicycle reaches the speed of 28 miles per hour, and equipped with a speedometer.

Electric bicycles are governed by the same law as other bicycles, subject to any local restrictions. They may be operated on any part of a street or highway where bicycles are authorized to travel, including a bicycle lane or other portion of a roadway designated for exclusive use by bicyclists.

Class 1 and 2 electric bicycles are allowed on greenways and multi-use paths unless the local government bans their use by ordinance. Class 3 bikes are banned unless the local city council passes an ordinance to allow their use.

Beginning January 1, 2017, manufacturers and distributors of electric bicycles were required to apply a label that is permanently affixed, in a prominent location, to each electric bicycle, indicating its class.

Driver's licenses, registration, insurance and license plate requirements do not apply. An electric bicycle is not a motor vehicle. Drinking and driving laws apply. Additional laws or ordinances may apply to the use of electric bicycles by each city or county.

==== Texas ====
"Bicycles" and "Electric Bicycles" are legally defined in the Texas Transportation Code Title 7, Chapter 664 entitled "Operation of Bicycles, Mopeds, and Play Vehicles" in Subchapter G. Under Chapter 541.201 (24), "Electric bicycle" means a bicycle that is (A) designed to be propelled by an electric motor, exclusively or in combination with the application of human power, (B) cannot attain a speed of more than 20 miles per hour without the application of human power, and (C) does not exceed a weight of 100 pounds (45 kg). The department or a local authority may not prohibit the use of an electric bicycle on a highway that is used primarily by motor vehicles. The department or a local authority may prohibit the use of an electric bicycle on a highway used primarily by pedestrians.

"Medical Exemptions" are also a standard right in the State of Texas for motorcycles & even bicyclists. Through Texas's motorcycle helmet law (bicycle helmet laws from city ordinances), it is only required for those 21 years old or younger to wear a helmet. However, a medical exemption, written by a certified licensed medical physician or licensed chiropractor, which exempts one from wearing a helmet, can be used for bicyclists if helmets are required.

==== Utah ====
According to Utah Code 41-6a-102 (17) <Utah Code Section 41-6a-102> an electric assisted bicycle is equipped with an electric motor with a power output of not more than 750 watts and is not capable of further assistance at a speed of more than 20 mph (32 km/h), or at 28 mph (45 km/h) while pedaling and using a speedometer. New laws specifically exclude electric pedal-assisted bicycles as "motorized vehicles" and bicycles are permitted on all state land (but not necessarily on Indian Reservations, nor restrictive municipalities, such as in Park City Code 10-1-4.5 where electric bicycles are generally not allowed on bike paths^{2}) if the motor is not more than 750 Watts, and the assistance shuts off at 20 mph (32 km/h) (Utah Traffic Code 53-3-202-17-a ^{1}). E-bikes sold in Utah are required to have a sticker that details the performance capacity. Children under 14 can operate an electric bicycle if accompanied by a parent/guardian, but children under 8 may not. (Utah code 41-6a-1115.5) No license, registration, or insurance is required by the State but some municipalities may require these measures (Salt Lake City and Provo require registration).

^{1} Utah Traffic Code Utah Code Section 41-6a-102 ^{2} Park city, Utah Municipal Code Park City : Municipal Code

==== Vermont ====
"Motor-driven cycle" means any vehicle equipped with two or three wheels, a power source providing up to a maximum of two brake horsepower and having a maximum piston or rotor displacement of 50 cubic centimeters if a combustion engine is used, which will propel the vehicle, unassisted, at a speed not to exceed 30 miles per hour (48 kilometres per hour) on a level road surface, which does not require clutching or shifting by the operator. The designation is a replacement for "scooter" and "moped;" Vermont does not seem to have laws specifically for e-bikes.

Operators of motor-driven cycles are required to have a valid driver's license but not a motorcycle endorsement.

==== Virginia ====
Virginia laws that cover electric bicycles include Va. Code § 46.2-100; § 46.2-903; § 46.2-904; § 46.2-908.1; § 46.2-906.1.

E-bikes are allowed on sidewalks and bike paths, but are subject to local city or county restrictions. E-bikes are not subject to the registration, licensing or insurance requirements that apply to motor vehicles.

==== Washington ====
A law that came into effect on June 7, 2018, defines electric-assisted bicycles as a bicycle with two or three wheels, a saddle, fully operative pedals for human propulsion, and an electric motor of no more than 750 watts. The law divides electric-assisted bicycles into three classes:

- Class 1 — "an electric assisted bicycle in which the motor provides assistance only when the rider is pedaling and ceases to provide assistance when the bicycle reaches the speed of twenty miles per hour";
- Class 2 — "an electric assisted bicycle in which the motor may be used exclusively to propel the bicycle and is not capable of providing assistance when the bicycle reaches the speed of twenty miles per hour";
- Class 3 — "an electric assisted bicycle in which the motor provides assistance only when the rider is pedaling and ceases to provide assistance when the bicycle reaches the speed of twenty-eight miles per hour and is equipped with a speedometer."

No drivers license is required and there is no age restriction for operation of Class 1 and 2 e-bikes, but one must be at least 16 years old to use a Class 3 bike.

All classes of electric-assisted bicycles may be operated on a fully controlled limited access highway. Class 1 and 2 electric bicycles can be used on sidewalks, but Class 3 bicycles "may not be used on a sidewalk unless there is no alternative to travel over a sidewalk as part of a bicycle or pedestrian path." Generally a person may not operate an electric-assisted bicycle on a trail that is designated as non-motorized and that has a natural surface, unless otherwise authorized.

Since July 1, 2018, manufacturers or distributors offering new electric-assisted bicycles in Washington state must affix a permanent label in a prominent place on the bike containing the classification number, top assisted speed, and motor wattage of the bike.

== See also ==
- Outline of cycling
- Personal transporter (International regulation section)
