= Pedelec =

Bicycle with electric-motor-assisted pedalling

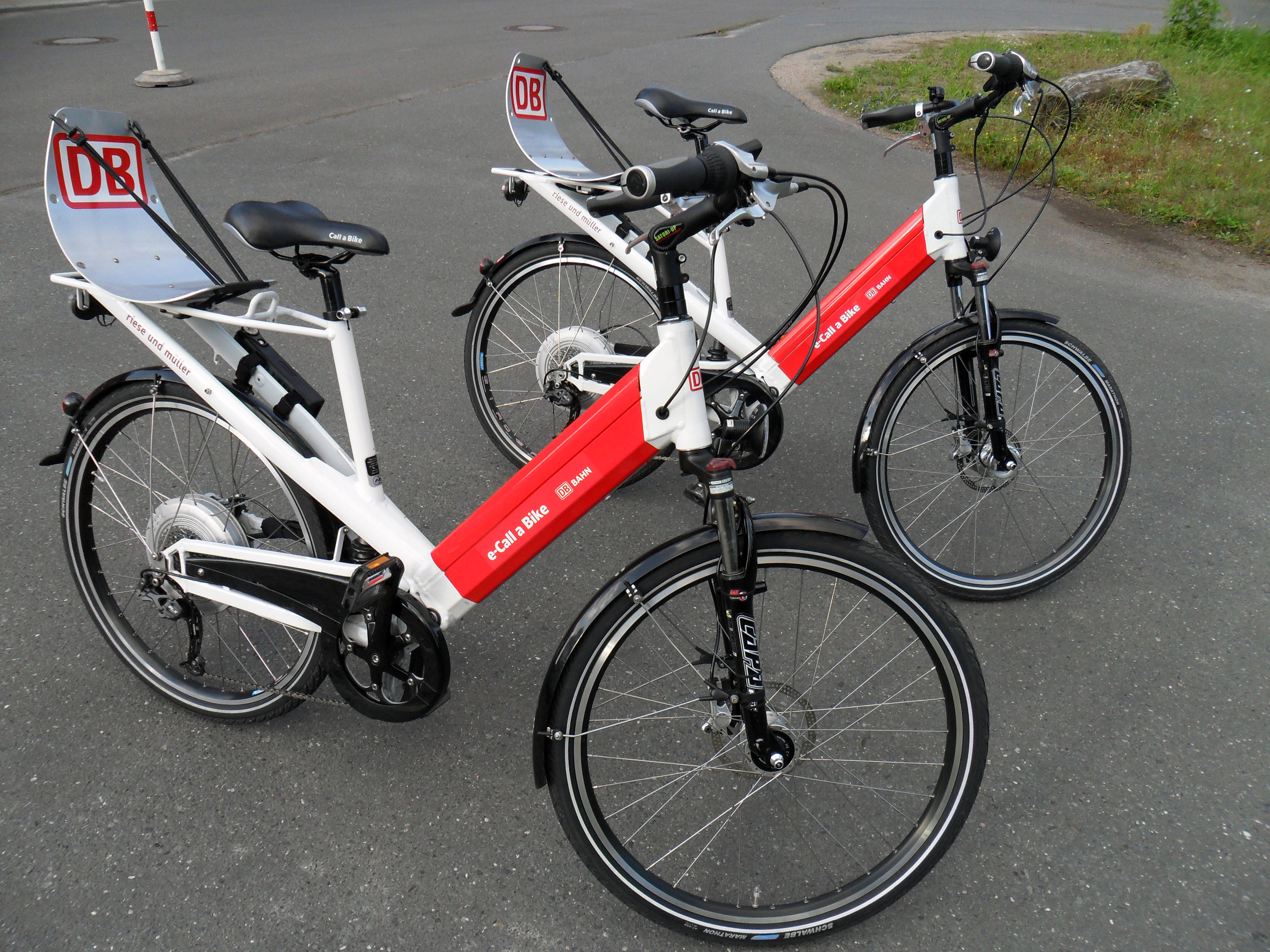
Deutsche Bahn pedelecs with rear hub motors and batteries placed inside the frames. This is the "Jetstream" from Riese und Müller.

Pedelec (from pedal electric cycle), or EPAC (electrically power-assisted cycle), or EAPC (electrically assisted pedal cycle), are electric bicycles or e-bikes where the electric motor is controlled by the rider's pedalling. In many countries "pedelec" describes the majority of all electric bicycles legally in use, but is not itself a legal description and as such seldom used. Many jurisdictions classify pedelec-type bicycles almost the same as unmotorized bicycles, with few or no legal restrictions, as opposed to mopeds, where the riders are subject to the same regulations as motor vehicles, e.g. requiring a license, a vehicle registration, insurance, wearing a helmet, or age restrictions.

== Types ==
The International Transport Forum defines a pedelec as: "A type of pedal-assisted electric bicycle where the electric assistance cuts off when the vehicle reaches approximately 25 km/h (exact limit depends on local regulations). A pedelec only provides assistance when the user is pedalling."

Pedelecs according to the EU-definition are legally permitted to act in the same manner as an e-bike below a speed of 6 km/h (3.7 mph). The motor may be operated with a switch or twist-grip instead of pedals, as a start-assist or push-assist when walking. Many or most pedelecs do not supply this function.

Over 6 km/h pedelecs require at least the turning of the pedal cranks in order to supply any electrical power to the motor. The required force or speed does not appear to be regulated except indirectly in Japan whose rules specify the motor power to not exceed the human power. Some early Chinese pedelecs switched the motor on fully after commencing pedalling.

In order to fulfill the Japanese rules an electronic controller is required to modulate the motor speed and/or torque as a function of the pedalling speed and/or torque. EU-defined pedelecs use this solution as well in order to provide smooth acceleration and to cut motor power when required.

All pedelec-related legislations require the controller to cut power when the rider is no longer pedalling, braking, or when a certain road speed is reached. This is 25 km/h or 15.5 mph in many countries, notably EU and UK, 15 mph (24 km/h) in Japan, or 45 km/h (28 mph) for S-pedelecs. S-pedelecs are, however, not pedelecs in the legal sense, but rather treated in a similar manner as mopeds except that pedalling is mandatory at least between 30 km/h and 45 km/h. In North America pedelecs are not defined, but allowed, limited to 20 mph (32 km/h).

Most pedelecs are like other e-bikes parallel hybrids with the motor and the pedal torques added at the driven wheel or at the pedal crankset. The Swiss Velocity S-pedelec is uniquely a mechanical series hybrid with the motor and pedal motions added at constant torque in a differential gear. Some pedelecs are electronic series hybrids with all human power going to a pedalled electric generator and transferred electrically to the motor. Usually there is a battery and electronic controller included in order to provide more power and optimise the pedalling feeling. The electronic bike concept was pioneered by Harald Kutzke as a means to provide a chainless "ideal bicycle" appearing to the rider to have no mass and no friction and yet be pedal-controlled and fully programmable. The combination of a chainless series-hybrid pedal generator and several motors in cargo-cycles has since been adopted by a number of manufacturers. In spite of large dimensions and load capacity, they can operate under the EU 250 W rule.

Increasingly more powerful and faster electronic bikes are being sold. These are often legally considered motorcycles, despite the pedals being reduced to a control device, with the actual human power input insignificant or even unused.

== History ==
The pedelec-principle appeared first in US Patent 3,884,317 awarded to Augustus Kinzel in 1975. Egon Gelhard in 1982 in US Patent 4,541,500 included a claim for the bicycle's motor switching on above a road speed of 1 m/s.

In 1983 legislation appeared in the UK under which electric bicycles, tandems or tricycles could be operated up to a speed of 15 mph (24 km/h), but this did not specify pedelec operation, so that early models were controlled by twist-grips or switches and not pedals.

The European Union passed a similar directive with maximum 250 W motor power and a cut-out of 25 km/h (15.6 mph), but with the important difference that it applied only to pedelecs.

Yamaha invented its PAS Power Assist System in 1989 and in late 1993 unveiled its first PAS bicycle, the AX1, conforming to new Japanese regulations. By mid-1994 30,000 and by mid-1997 200,000 PAS bicycles were sold. PAS used torque and speed sensors to yield a true pedelec with a 235 W motor and a maximum 1:1 motor-to-human power-ratio up to 15 km/h and a linear reduction to zero power at 24 km/h (15 mph).

The United States and Canada passed rather different laws in 2001 allowing 750 W and 500 W motors and a top speed of 20 mph (32 km/h) without requiring pedalling.

Switzerland adopted the EU directive for a time but introduced its own speed category in 1991 and today has several categories differing from all others. This allowed the use of the first S-pedelec and maybe even the absolutely first commercial pedelec, the Velocity, later named Dolphin Ebike, designed by Michael Kutter from 1989 and sold from 1993.

The principle remained unchanged in newer models by licensees (Swizzbee in 2004 and iZip (Currie) in 2008). However, Kutter died early in 2015 and with him his small company. The Swiss rules initially did not have the 45 km/h cut-off later imposed and the Velocity won most e-bicycle races. It was later adopted by the Los Angeles bicycle police, who bought 100 iZip Expresses in 2012. The nominal motor power had by then been increased to 750 W for the North American market; top speeds of the police model of about 40 mph (~64 km/h) were reported.

In 1995 the Swiss company BKTech sold its first pedelec under the name Flyer and with intensive marketing opened up the Swiss market. Up to 2018, the Canadian company BioniX produced an easy-to-install pedelec kit with a gearless hub motor complete with rear wheel, that also became popular in Europe.

The EU began to approach the Japanese level around 2007 and by 2010 produced one million e-bikes, mostly pedelecs. In contrast China had by then produced 22 million, probably not pedelecs and including e-roller type vehicles. Today China produces most of the world's e-bike components to the specifications provided.

== Legal status of pedelecs worldwide ==
The following section is about regulations specifically applying to pedelecs. Additional manufacturing standards may also apply. To really be useful, it is important for a pedelec to be legally classified as a bicycle in each country or jurisdiction rather than classified as a moped or motorcycle. Otherwise it may not be allowed in bike lanes or on bike paths; may have to be registered; the rider may have to wear a motorcycle helmet; and/or vehicle insurance may have to be paid for.

=== Europe ===
In the European Union the Regulation (EU) No 168/2013 exempts vehicles with the following definition from the requirement for type approval, registration, insurance, or license plate, if it adheres to these rules:

1. Motor power up to 250 W (continuous)
2. Motor is active only when the pedals are turned
3. Motor assistance is progressively reduced and finally cut off before the vehicle speed reaches 25 km/h (16 mph)

This effectively describes pedelecs in the legal sense. If any of these rules is not followed, the vehicle is classified as another type of e-bike or motorbike and may require a license plate, insurance and driving license.

=== Asia ===
==== Hong Kong ====
Pedelecs, and all kinds of mechanical assist, are regarded as "motor vehicles" and classified as motor cycles, making legal registration impossible. The Hong Kong Transport Department is currently conducting a review with regulations expected in 2026. The authorities plan to allow power-assisted cycles on all cycle tracks, given that they operate in a similar way to bicycles.

==== Singapore ====
Pedelecs are allowed, when wearing a helmet, the motor output is limited to 200 W and the motor cuts out by 25 km/h.

==== India ====
Electric vehicles whose motor's power is under 250 W and whose maximum speed doesn't exceed 25 km/h, require no registration under the Central Motor Vehicle Rules. They can be driven freely without license or other paperwork.

==== Japan ====
Electric-assisted bicycles are treated as human-powered bicycles, while bicycles capable of propulsion by electric power alone face additional registration and regulatory requirements as mopeds. Requirements include electric power generation by a motor that cannot be easily modified, along with a power assist mechanism that operates safely and smoothly. In December 2008, the assist ratio was updated as follows:

- Under 10 km/h; 2
- 10–24 km/h; $2 - \tfrac{\text{speed in }\tfrac{km}{h} - 10}{7}$
- Over 24 km/h; 0

In October 2017, only for the special case that three-wheel bicycle that draws a cart with a device to be drawn, the ratio was updated as follows:

- Under 10 km/h; 3
- 10–24 km/h; $2 - \tfrac{3 \cdot \text{speed in }\tfrac{km}{h} - 10}{14}$
- Over 24 km/h; 0

Other parameters have also been published, in particular a 1:1 ratio up to 15 km/h.

=== Oceania ===
==== Australia ====
Australia has two electric bicycle categories, throttle-controlled e-bikes with 200 W maximum motor power and pedelecs as per the European Regulation (EU) No 168/2013. Some states have variations. New South Wales allows pedelecs up to 500 W motor power.

== Technical ==
=== Components ===
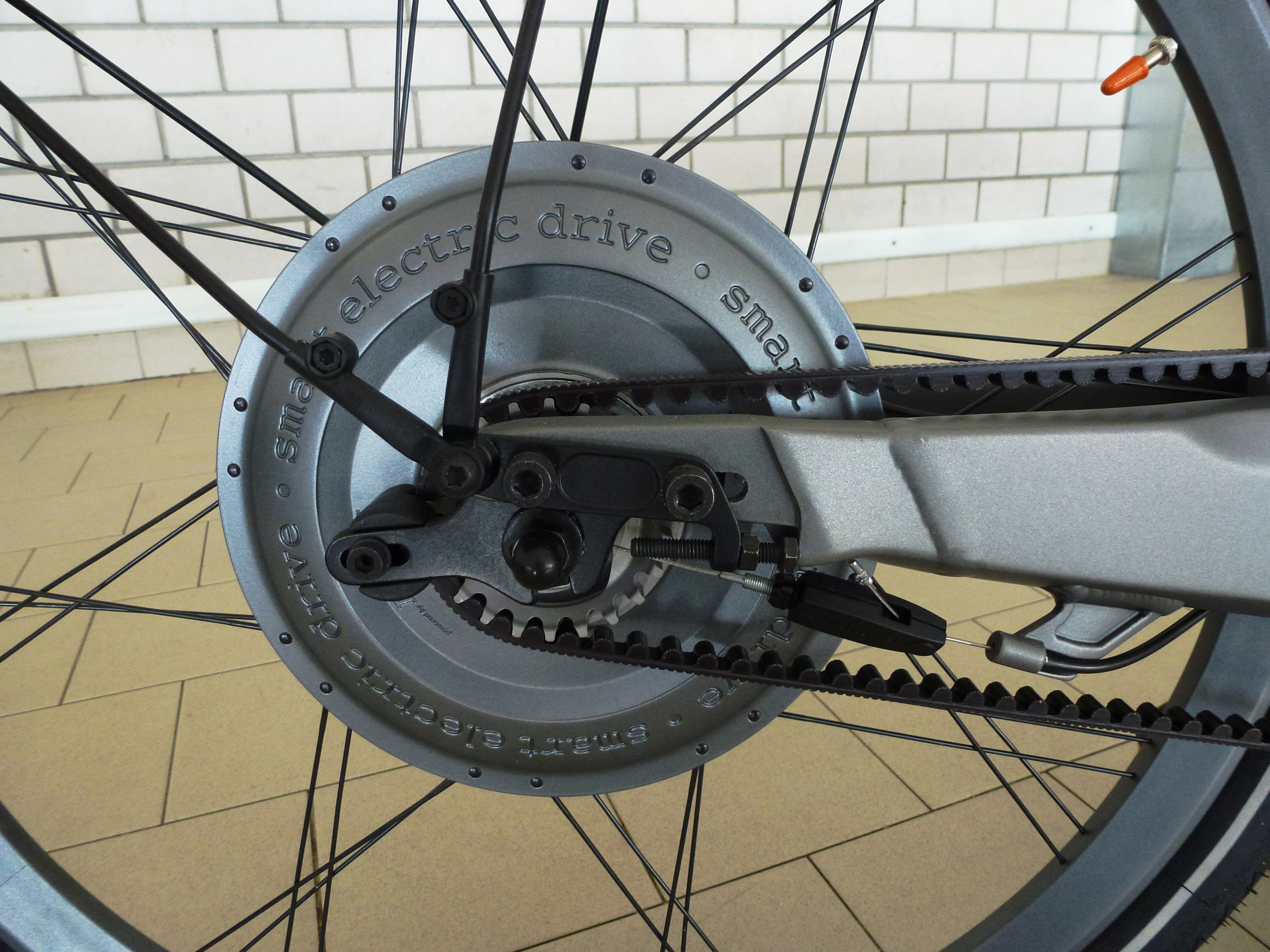
Smart e-bike motor

Pedelecs mainly have the same components as ordinary electric bicycles. They differ in using a control system for the motor with sensors to detect the speed and/or the torque of the cranks instead of a twist-grip controller or buttons. Some manufacturers offer both systems simultaneously.

==== Motor control ====
For switching or control of the motor, there are several possibilities:

- Measuring the force or torque from the signal of a force sensor on the pedals, the pedal crank, the chain or at the wheel
- Measurement of pedalling speed from a revolution counter or rotary speed sensor at the crank or at another suitable location
- Measurement of both force and speed
- Measurement of acceleration or drawbar force at a push trailer
- Measurement of electrical values in a serial hybrid (pedal generator)

In addition, the speed of the vehicle is measured at the wheel, in particular to reduce or cut the motor power at the legally specified speeds.

The measurement can be further processed mechanically or electronically and is used to control the motor on and off or to regulate a control function. The power supplied is also dependent on the chosen level of support, usually in several so-called support levels from zero to maximum. Some models allow manual switching from torque to speed control.

In addition some pedelecs may have a provision to operate the motor without pedalling e.g. for hill starting or when walking the bicycle at low speed.

When motors are loaded strongly, especially when going uphill they may heat up significantly. Some have temperature sensors in order to then reduce power. Most models disconnect the battery at a predetermined discharge voltage to prevent total discharge and to ensure sufficient supply for the operation of the lighting system.

===== Force control =====
Force can be measured by torque sensors near the crankset or with strain gauges on the axles of hub motors. For example the rear wheel hub motors introduced by BionX measure pedalling force this way.

===== Rotary motion detection =====
Instantaneous pedalling speed can be measured with optical or magnetic sensors and slotted discs. The single pedal crank magnets and reed switches often used for bicycle computers are slow and may give jerky motion. They also do not show the direction of rotation. This is required in order to avoid an accidental fast backward spin of the pedals suddenly applying full power.

Since the pedalling force required rises sharply with speed, some models with a speed sensor can suffice without a force sensor.

=== Range ===
Generally the maximum range of a pedelec trip before using up one battery charge is of the same order as that with a similar e-bike and thus mainly dependent on the trip conditions and the human rider. The total power required for a steady speed can be determined if the different parameters are known, as a sum of human plus motor power.

As a pedelec cannot be used without some human power input, its range is higher than with an e-bike used without pedalling at the same speed. However, if the hybrid use results in a higher speed, the power required is higher - by the third power of the speed in the case of overcoming air drag - which decreases the range. As an example, if a bicycle with rider can achieve 20 km/h with a rider power of 75 W, an additional 75 W from a motor can raise this to about 25 km/h. Therefore the usable range while using the motor will vary greatly depending on the exact speed chosen between 20 and 25 km/h.

Most pedelecs are of sufficiently light construction that they are usable even with an exhausted battery and not inherently range-limited. Very heavy pedelecs with high-resistance tires or inefficient series-hybrid electronic bikes will only be able to be pedalled slowly with a flat battery, and thus only for a short range.

== Safety ==
Safety issues for pedelecs are much the same as with all e-bikes. However, the use of S-pedelecs involves an additional risk. Not only do they often achieve higher average and top speeds (up to 45 km/h still using the motor) but also longer trip distances.

On the other hand, S-pedelecs are less likely to be overtaken by motor vehicles and more likely to be of sound construction. Riders must have licences and insurance, speedometers and helmets. Commuters are more likely to substitute trips otherwise undertaken with more dangerous motor vehicles.

As pedelecs require human effort, the health benefits overcompensate occurring injuries or death. Health-impact assessments of 30 studies show a median value of 9 times more benefits than risks in favour of active travel, including cycling, as reported by the OECD. In addition, "injuries and deaths occur at lower rates as more people walk or cycle".

== See also ==
- Motorized bicycle
- Electric bicycle
- Electric bicycle laws
- Electric assisted velomobiles
