= Bion of Soli =

Ancient Greek writer

Bion (Ancient Greek: Βίων) of Soli was a writer of ancient Greece who wrote on history and agriculture. It is unclear which Soli specifically he lived in, as there were several cities with that name, but it seems likely it was the Soli in Cilicia, since he was cited so frequently by Roman scholars, and the Cilician Soli was a Hellenized city of great strategic importance to Rome. He lived in or before the 1st century BCE.

Bion is mentioned by 3rd-century writer Diogenes Laertius as the author of a work on Aethiopia (Αἰθιοπικά), of which a few fragments are preserved in the works of Pliny the Elder and Athenaeus, and in the Anecdota Graeca of 19th-century classical scholar John Cramer.

Whether he is the same as the one from whom Plutarch quotes a tradition respecting the Amazons, and from whom 6th-century poet Agathias quotes a statement respecting the history of Assyria, is uncertain. The 1st-century CE scholar Varro mentions Bion of Soli among the writers on agriculture; and Pliny refers to the same or similar works, in the Elenchi to several books.

Some think that Bion of Soli is the same person as the "Caecilius Bion" whom Pliny also frequently mentions.
