= Bion (poet) =

6th century BCE Greek historian

Bion (Ancient Greek: Βίων) was a tragic poet of ancient Greece, whom 3rd-century writer Diogenes Laertius describes as "a writer of tragedies of the Tarsian type".

Late 16th/early 17th century classical scholar Isaac Casaubon wrote that with these words Diogenes was describing a poet whose works were characterized by extempore, improvised poetry, of which the inhabitants of Tarsus were particularly fond. He also believed that Bion lived shortly before or at the time of Strabo, that is the 1st-century BCE.

In the Byzantine encyclopedia known as the Suda, it's written that a son of the late 6th/early 5th century BCE tragedian Aeschylus was also a tragic poet, and was named Bion; but nothing further is known about him.
