= Cytronex =

Cytronex is a lightweight electric bike system fitted to existing bicycles by the British company Modern Times Ltd. The system is designed and assembled at the company's base in Winchester, England.

The bicycle's 36V battery looks like a water bottle; the brushless hub motor is a similar size to a hub dynamo; and most of the cables are concealed. Bicycle lights powered directly by a switching regulator in the battery are also an intrinsic part of the system.

A Cytronex powered Cannondale Super Six carbon racing bike was featured during episode 16 of Channel 5's The Gadget Show in November 2009, on which presenter Ortis Deley raced professional cyclist Russell Downing at Holme Moss on the route of the Tour of Britain in the Pennines. The bicycle used during the television feature weighs 12.9 kg.

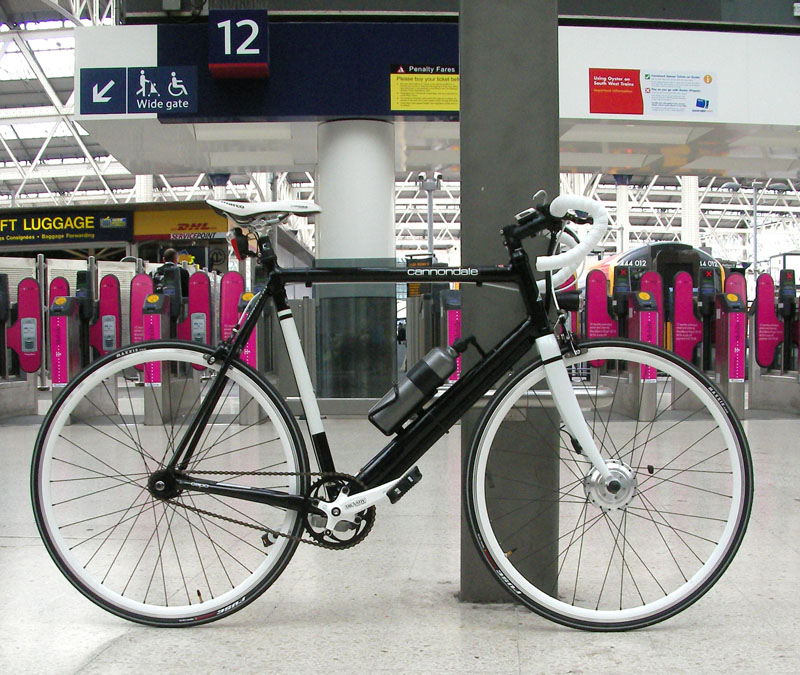
Cytronex powered Cannondale Capo
