= E-bike =

Motorized bicycle with an integrated electric motor

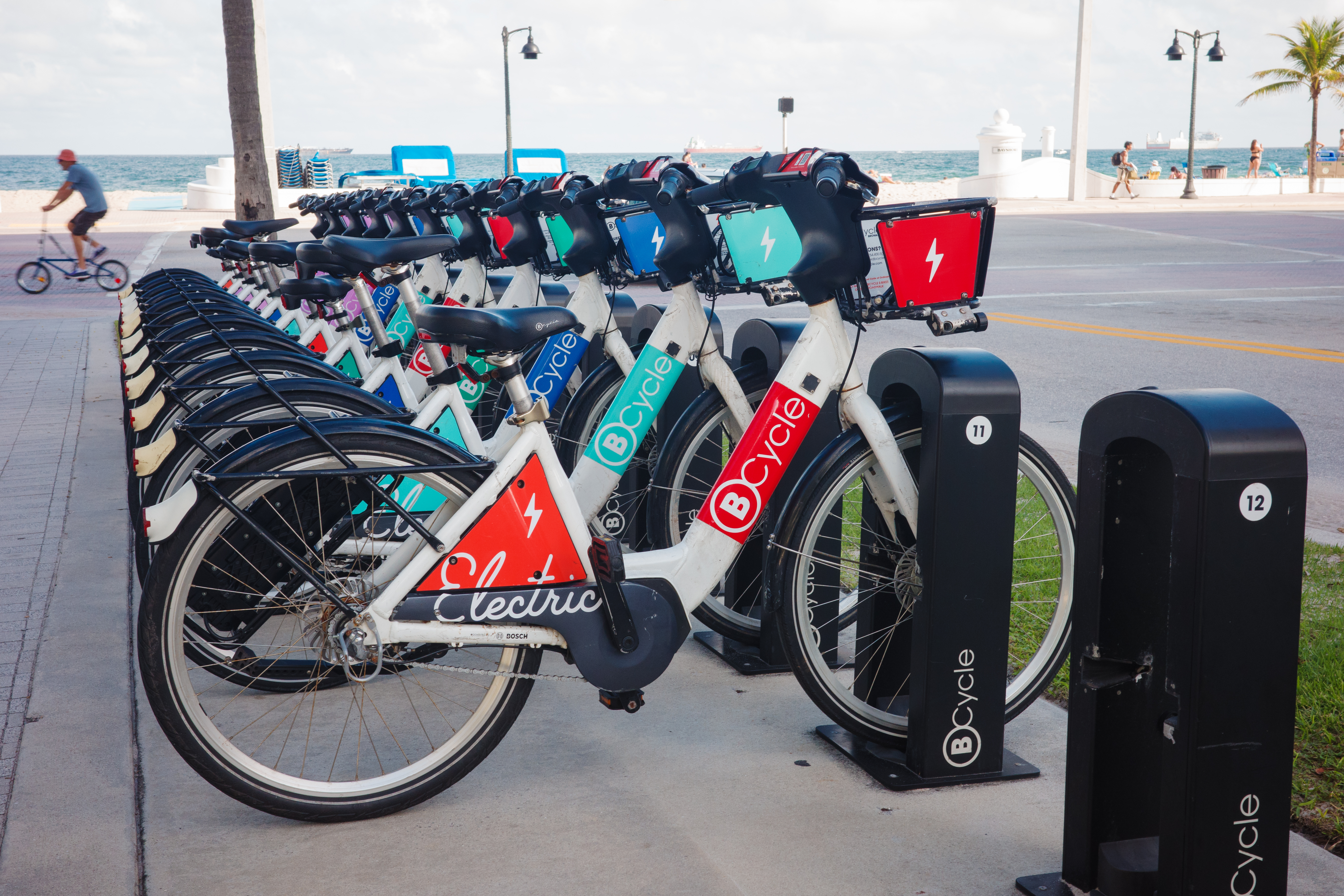
A bay of electric hire bikes in Fort Lauderdale, Florida

An e-bike or electric bicycle is a type of a motorized bicycle with an integrated electric motor used to assist propulsion. E-bikes, alongside bicycles and e-scooters, are types of micromobility vehicles. E-bikes are a quick and reliable method of transportation, a fun type of recreation, and also an adaptive technology for weaker, older, disabled, or inexperienced riders. An e-bike's electric motor helps riders cover greater distances and steeper hills without the need for high physical effort. E-bikes are sold in a large number of different form factors for different use cases and sporting purposes. E-bikes are generally not suitable for long-distance cycling as the battery usually lasts 40 km (25 mi) to 120 km (75 mi) per charge, depending on the power level used.

E-bikes generally fall into two broad categories: bikes that require the rider's pedal-power (i.e. pedelecs) and bikes that control the motor with a throttle such as a twistgrip, integrating moped-style functionality. Both retain the ability to be pedaled by the rider unlike electric motorcycles and e-scooters. E-bikes use rechargeable batteries and are typically motor-powered up to 25 to 32 km/h (16 to 20 mph), some to 45 km/h (28 mph).

In many places, e-bikes (especially pedelecs) are legally classified as bicycles rather than mopeds or motorcycles. This exempts them from more stringent laws regarding their certification and operation, such as licensing and mandatory safety equipment. E-bikes can also be defined separately and treated under distinct electric bicycle laws.

== History ==
=== 1890s ===
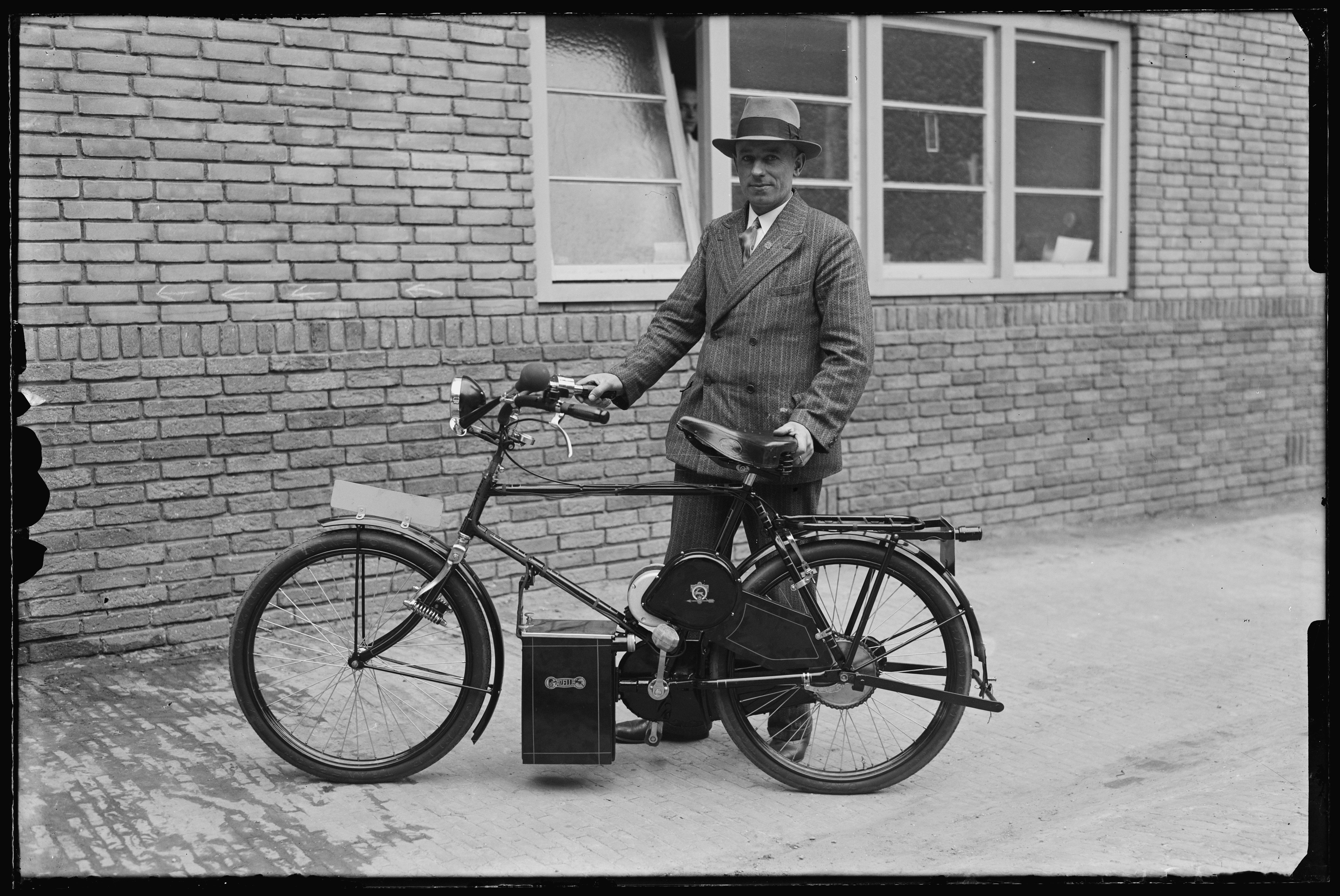
A man with a Gazelle bicycle with an electrically powered motor, 1935.

In the 1890s, electric bicycles were documented within various U.S. patents. For example, on 31 December 1895, Ogden Bolton Jr. was granted a patent for a battery-powered bicycle with a "6-pole brush-and-commutator direct current (DC) hub motor mounted in the rear wheel" (U.S. patent 552,271). There were no gears and the motor could draw up to 100 amperes from a 10-volt battery.

Two years later, in 1897, Hosea W. Libbey of Boston invented an electric bicycle (U.S. patent 596,272) that was propelled by a "double electric motor". The motor was designed within the hub of the crankset axle, and use of the battery could be split depending on flat or inclined road use.

By 1898, a rear-wheel drive electric bicycle, which used a driving belt along the outside edge of the wheel, was patented by Mathew J. Steffens. An 1899 patent by John Schnepf (U.S. patent 627,066) depicted an electric bicycle with a rear-wheel friction, "roller-wheel"-style drive.

=== 1960s ===
In 1969, Schnepf's invention was expanded by G.A. Wood Jr. (U.S. patent 3,431,994). Wood's device used four fractional horsepower motors connected through a series of gears.

Hub motors fell out of favor until around 2015 when they made a resurgence on inexpensive electric bikes.

=== 1990s to present day ===
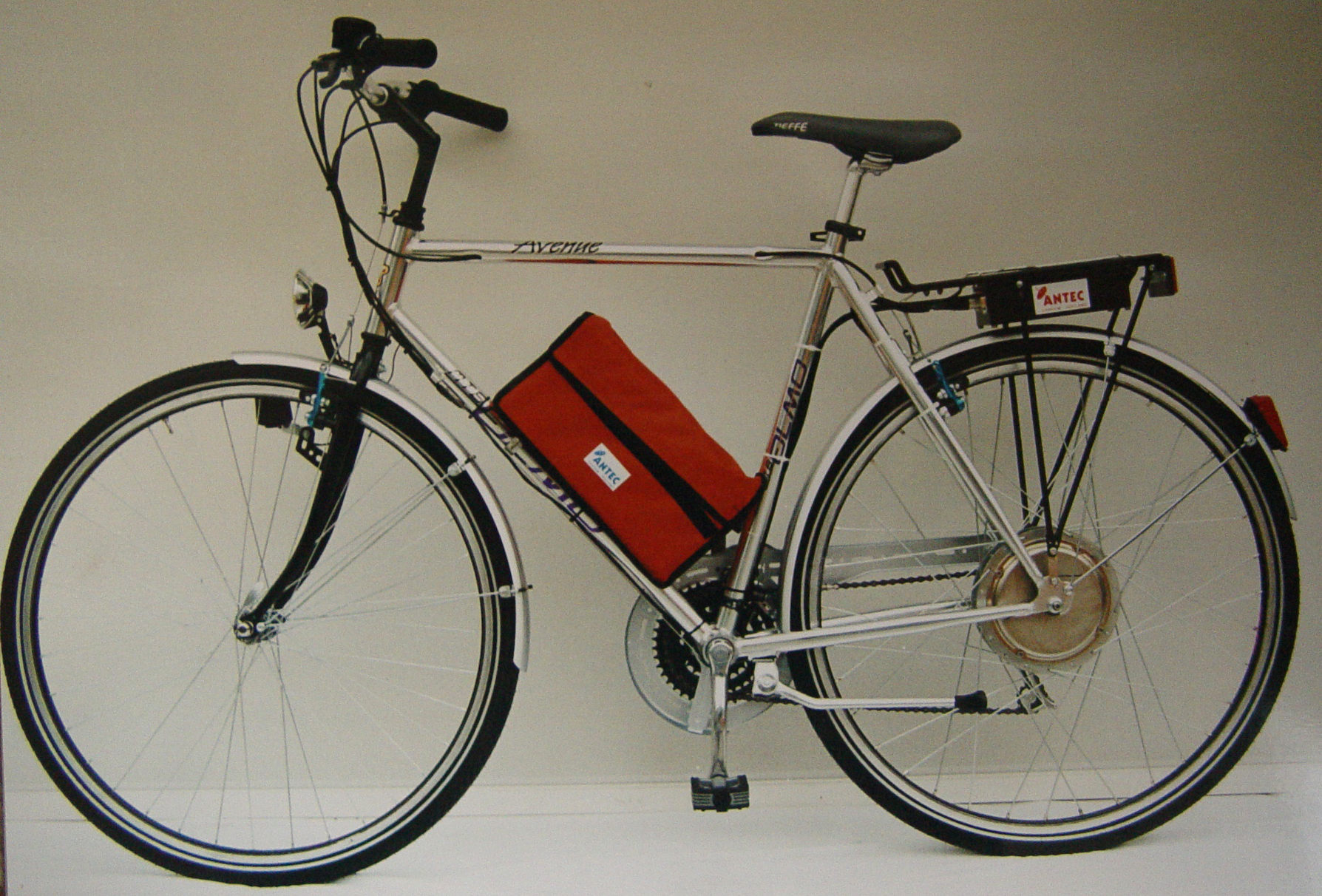
Electric bicycle by Antec, 1991

From 1992, Vector Services Limited offered the Zike e-bike. The bicycle included nickel–cadmium battery (NiCad) batteries that were built into a frame member and included an 850 g (30 oz) permanent-magnet motor.

Torque sensors and power controls were developed during the late 1990s. For example, a Japanese patent (6163148) was granted in 1997 to a team led by Yutaka Takada, for a "Sensor, drive force auxiliary device ... and torque sensor zero point adjusting mechanism".

American car executive Lee Iacocca founded EV Global Motors in 1997, a company that produced an electric bicycle model named E-bike SX, and it was one of the early efforts to popularize e-bikes in the US.

By 2007, e-bikes were thought to make up 10 to 20 percent of all two-wheeled vehicles on the streets of many major Chinese cities. A typical unit then required eight hours to charge the battery, which provides the range of 40 to 48 kilometres (25 to 30 mi), at the speed of around 20 km/h (12 mph).

In the 2010s e-bikes attracted considerable traction in Europe led by government policies and environmental awareness encouraging sustainable technologies. Some countries such as Germany and Netherlands turned into significant e-bikes markets with the aim to reduce urban congestion and carbon emissions. Moreover, the evolution of lithium-ion battery (Li-ion) technology contributed to e-bikes adoption. They provided faster charging times, lighter weight and longer range in order to make e-bikes more efficient and practical for daily use. Additional advancements in hydroformed aluminum alloys and carbon fiber allowed manufacturers to reduce weight while maintaining frame strength. Bikes released in the 2020s featured improved microcontrollers with smoothed power delivery, torque sensors and brushless dc motors.

== Definition and classes ==
E-Bike classes used in most US states
Dimension / Attribute	Class 1	Class 2	Class 3
Assist type	Pedal only	Throttle (optional pedal-assist)	Pedal only (some allow throttle to 20 mph)
Max assisted speed	20 mph	20 mph	28 mph
Max throttle speed	N/A	20 mph	N/A (or 20 mph cap)
Max motor wattage (continuous)	750W	750W	750W
Motor engagement	Requires pedaling	Propels without pedaling	Requires pedaling
Integrated speedometer	Optional	Optional	Mandatory
Typical minimum age	None	None	16 years old
Helmet requirement	Standard bike laws	Standard bike laws	Mandatory for all riders
Paved bike path access	Generally permitted	Allowed; sometimes restricted	Often restricted to roads/lanes
Mountain bike trail access	Allowed on multi-use trails	Mostly restricted	Prohibited on non-motorized trails

In the United States, many jurisdictions allow e-bikes up to "Class 3" to be operated without license.

As of 2025 many countries do not have quality standards for e-bikes, rules about who can ride them and where, or even a clear legal definition of what they are.

E-bikes are classed according to the power that their electric motor can deliver and the way the power is controlled by the rider. Bikes with highly powerful electric motors are considered to be mopeds or motorcycles in some areas. The classification of these e-bikes varies greatly, even across local jurisdictions.

The classification of e-bikes is sometimes decided by whether the e-bike's motor assists the rider using a pedal-assist system or by a power-on-demand one. Definitions of these are as follows:

- With pedal-assist, the electric motor is regulated by pedaling. The motor augments the efforts of the rider when they are pedaling. These e-bikes – called pedelecs – have a sensor to detect the pedaling speed, the pedaling force, or both.
- With power-on-demand, the motor is activated by a throttle, usually handlebar-mounted, more closely resembling motorcycles or scooters than the original pedal bicycle.

=== Pedelecs ===
The term "pedelec" (from pedal electric cycle) refers to an e-bike with mandatory pedalling, a relatively low-powered electric motor and a limited top speed using the motor. Pedelecs are legally classed as bicycles rather than low-powered motorcycles or mopeds.

The most influential definition of pedelecs comes from the EU. EU directive for motor vehicles EN15194 considers a bicycle to be a pedelec if:

1. The motorized assistance over a speed of 6 km/h (3.7 mph) only engages when the rider is pedalling,
2. The motor cuts out once 25 km/h (16 mph) is reached, and
3. The motor produces maximum continuous rated power of not more than 250 W (0.34 hp) (the motor can produce more power for short periods, such as when accelerating or climbing a steep hill).

An e-bike conforming to these conditions is considered to be a pedelec in the EU and is legally classed as a bicycle. The EN15194 standard is valid across the whole of the EU and has been adopted by some non-EU nations including the UK, and the state of Victoria in Australia.

Pedelecs are used much like conventional bicycles yet increase average speeds, especially when the rider is climbing or struggling against a headwind. Pedelecs therefore expand the areas and groups capable of regular cycling, making them popular for bicycle commuters, older riders, younger riders, and those with disabilities.

==== S-Pedelecs ====
More powerful pedelecs are sometimes dubbed S-Pedelecs (short for Speed-Pedelecs). These have a motor more powerful than 250 W (0.34 hp) and less limited, or unlimited, pedal-assist, i.e. the motor does not stop assisting the rider once 25 km/h (16 mph) has been reached. S-Pedelec class e-bikes are therefore sometimes classified as mopeds or motorcycles rather than as bicycles. In Switzerland the motor power is limited to 1,000 W (1.3 hp), the speed without pedalling to 30 km/h (19 mph) and under motor to 45 km/h (28 mph). In the United States, many states have adopted S-Pedelecs into the Class 3 category, limited to 750 W (1.01 hp) of power and 45 km/h (28 mph) speed. In Europe they are likely to be classed as mopeds, requiring a registration plate and a licensed rider. In Australia, they can only be used on private property.

=== Power-on-demand ===
Some e-bikes have an electric motor that operates using power-on-demand; the motor is engaged and operated manually using a throttle, controlled usually with a handgrip as on a motorbike or scooter.

With power-on-demand e-bikes the rider can:

1. ride by pedal power alone, i.e. fully human-powered.
2. ride by electric motor alone by operating the throttle manually.
3. ride using both together at the same time.
4. use instead a pedelec controller, if this is fitted.

Some power-on-demand only e-bikes are very different from, and are often not classified as, bicycles. For example, the Noped is a term used by the Ministry of Transportation of Ontario for e-bikes which are not fitted with pedals.

== Popularity ==
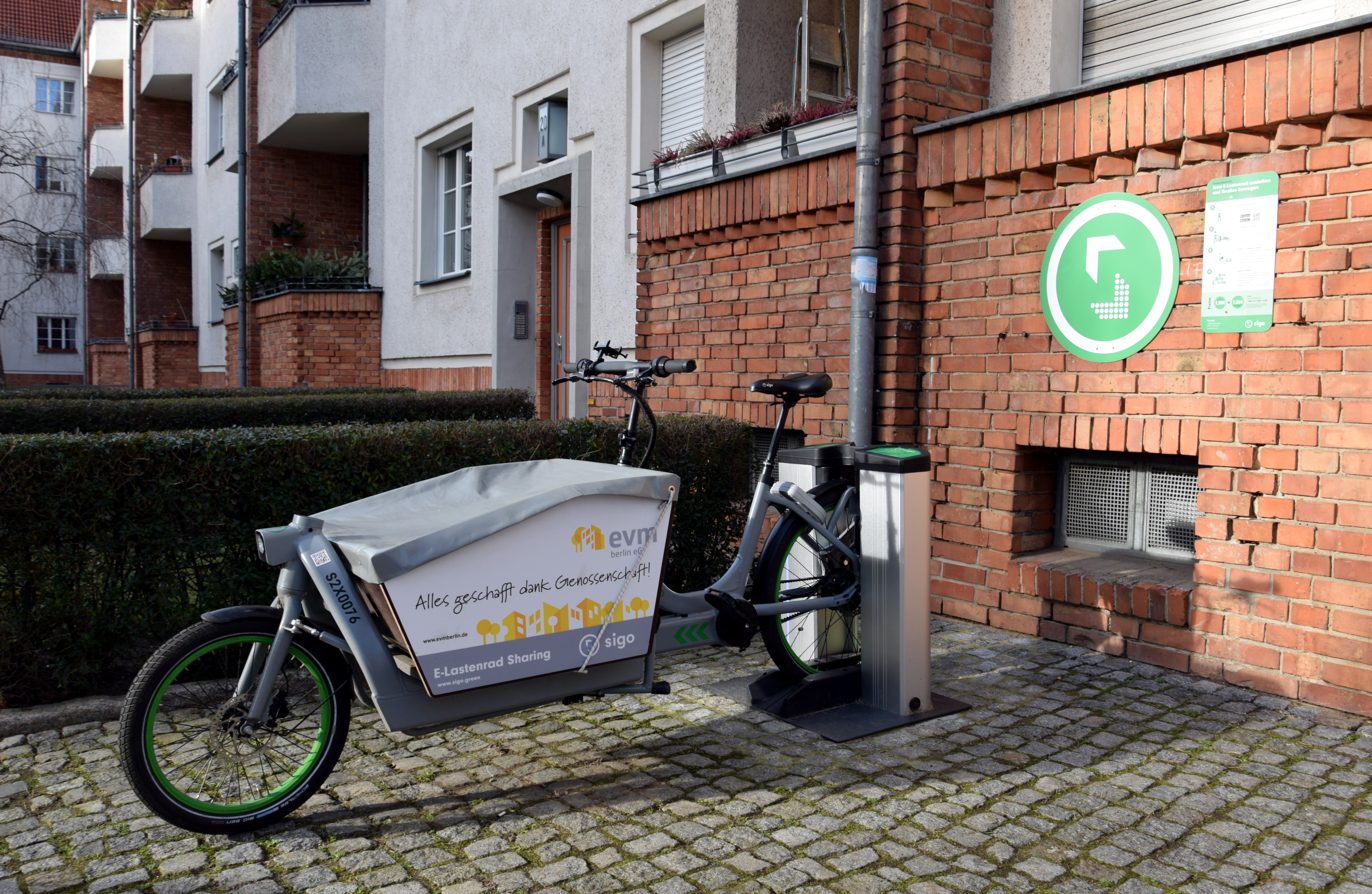
A bakfiets (box bike) style cargo bike charges at an e-bike sharing station in Berlin

E-bike usage worldwide has experienced rapid growth since 1998 as the technology matured and got more affordable. China is the world's leading producer of e-bikes. According to the data of the China Bicycle Association, a government-chartered industry group, in 2004 China's manufacturers sold 7.5 million e-bikes nationwide. domestic sales reached 10 million in 2005, and around 17 million in 2006. In 2016, approximately 210 million electric bikes were used daily in China.

According to trade umbrella body CONEBI, electric bike sales in the EU were over 5 million in 2021, up from 2 million in 2016, 700,000 in 2010 and 200,000 in 2007. In 2019, the EU implemented a 79.3% protective tariff on imported Chinese e-bikes to protect EU producers. In 2022, electric bikes continued to grow market share in the EU, rising to 57% of bike sales in the Netherlands, 49% in Austria, 48% in Germany and 47% in Belgium.

In Australia e-bike usage significantly increased through the first half of the 2020s, especially in major cities.

== Motors and drivetrains ==
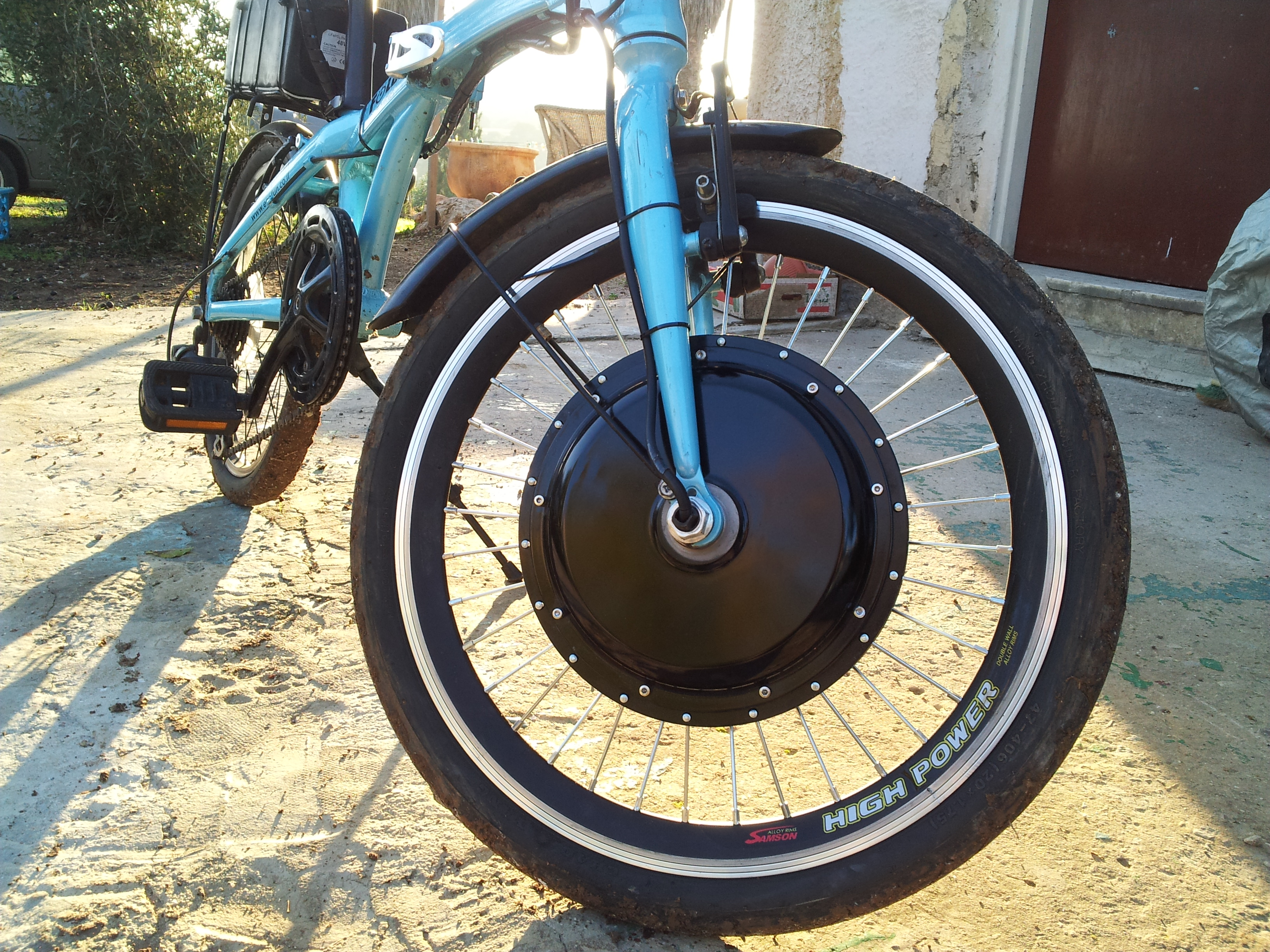
Electric bike with motor mounted in the front wheel

DC motors are commonly used in electric bicycles, either brushed or brushless. Many configurations are available, varying in cost and complexity; direct-drive and geared motor units are both used. An electric power-assist system may be added to almost any pedal cycle using chain drive, belt drive, hub motors or friction drive.

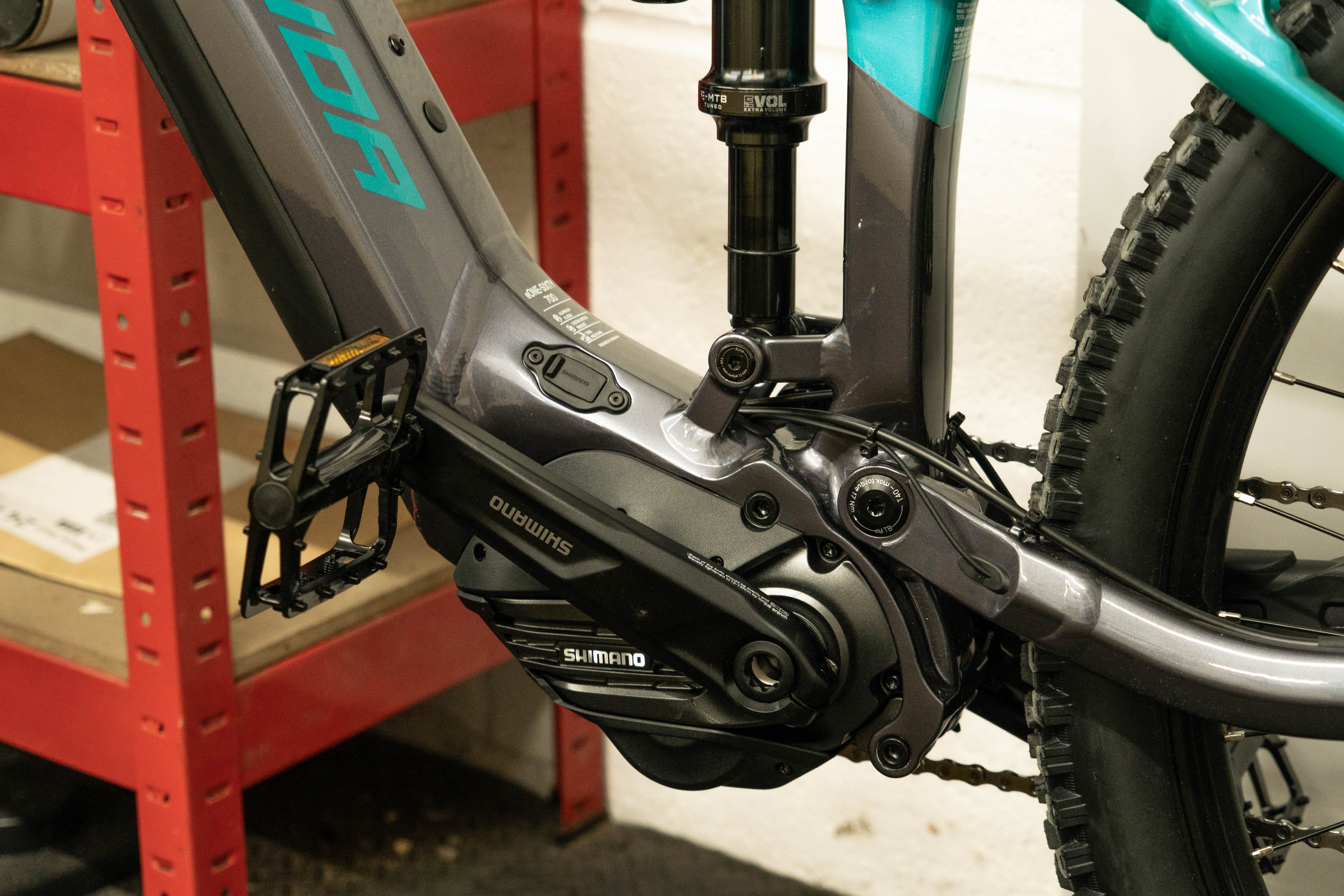
Electric mountain bike with a mid-drive motor mounted between the pedals

Brushless hub motors are the most common in modern designs. The motor is built into the wheel hub itself, while the stator is fixed solidly to the axle, and the magnets are attached to and rotate with the wheel. The bicycle wheel hub is the motor. The power levels of motors used are influenced by available legal categories and are often, but not always limited to under 750 W (1.01 hp). Hub motors are usually located in the rear wheel only but front hub and dual motor bikes also exist. Hub motors were common in 19th century electric bicycle designs but fell out of favor until their resurgence in the 2010s. The hub-motor design is more common among more affordable and less-established e-bike brands. Hub motors are also common for conversion kits and speed-focused custom builds.

Another type of electric assist motor is the mid-drive system, where the electric motor is not located in a wheel but instead drives the chain, usually mounted in or under the bottom bracket shell. The propulsion is provided at the pedals rather than at the wheel, being eventually applied to the wheel via the bicycle's standard drive train. A freewheel crank, a freewheel in the bottom bracket, is a necessary part in mid-drive systems to allow the electric motor to work inside its optimal rotational speed range (RPM).

Because the power is applied through the chain and sprocket, power is typically limited to around 250–500 W (0.34–0.67 hp) to protect against fast wear on the drivetrain although stronger mid-drives do exist and high-end e-bikes also employ a mid-drive design. Mid-drives can be combined with an internal gear hub. This may require care due to the lack of a clutch mechanism to soften the shock to the gears at the moment of re-engagement. A continuously variable transmission or a fully automatic internal gear hub may reduce the shocks due to the viscosity of oils used for liquid coupling instead of the mechanical couplings of the conventional internal gear hubs. Most drivetrain manufacturers now make special chains, gears, shifters, and hubs suitable for the higher dynamic loads of e-bikes or have upgraded their existing product lines to be stronger regardless of use case.

The main advantage mid-drive motors have over hub motors is that power is applied through the chain (or belt) and thus it uses the existing rear gears. This allows for the motor to operate more efficiently at a wider range of vehicle speeds. Without using the bicycle's gears, equivalent hub motors tend to be less effective propelling the e-bike slowly up steep hills and also less efficient at propelling the e-bike fast on the flat. Some riders find the feel and operation of a mid-drive e-bike to be more smooth, consistent, and similar to a non-electric bike.

== Batteries ==
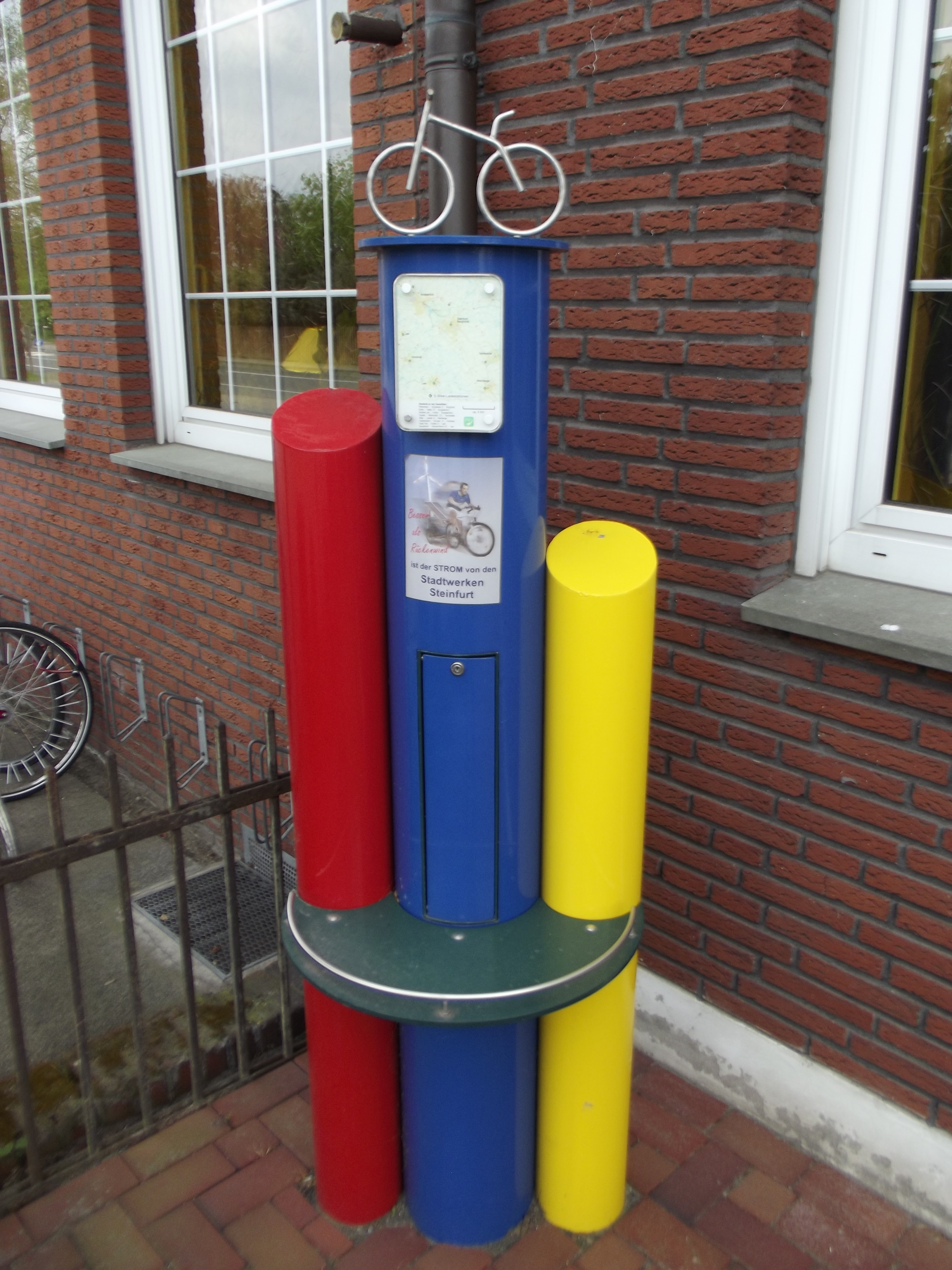
E-bike charging station, Germany

E-bikes use rechargeable batteries in addition to electric motors and some form of controller to deliver the power to the motor. Most e-bikes now use lithium-ion polymer (Li-ion) batteries but systems using sealed lead–acid (SLA), nickel–cadmium (NiCad), and nickel–metal hydride (NiMH) exist as well. Batteries vary according to the voltage, total charge capacity (amp hours), weight, number of charging cycles before performance degrades, and ability to handle over-voltage charging conditions. The energy costs of operating e-bikes are very small compared to the fuel or electricity costs of cars, but the cost of the battery is a significant portion of the cost of the bike so reliability of the battery and charger is important to keep ownership costs down. The lifespan of a battery pack varies depending on the type of usage including charging temperature. Room-temperature charging and shallow discharge/recharge cycles help extend the overall battery life. In the case of the most-used Li-ion batteries, there is no memory effect and thus no penalty for only charging partially.

Lithium ion batteries used in e-bikes and related vehicles such as electric scooters have been under scrutiny since 2019 due to their susceptibility to overheating and catching fire. The more expensive Lithium iron phosphate (LFP) batteries have safer thermal characteristics and are non-toxic. The increase in incidents where e-bike batteries were implicated in fires has been attributed to a rise in popularity and lack of regulations. Lower-quality batteries are more likely to be manufactured with defects that can cause bulging or bursting, however, there is an incredibly low instance of issue among larger more established manufacturers with chargers that avoid over-voltage. In 2024, the world's largest electric bike maker, Giant Manufacturing, went on record to say that it had never experienced an issue with a single battery catching fire. Gig workers who rely on using e-bikes to do their jobs may also be limited in their choice of vehicle and purchase a cheap or second-hand e-bike that is more prone to damage. Some jurisdictions, such as New York City and San Francisco, have passed laws requiring that all electric mobility devices sold have UL certified batteries.

Some experiments have also been undertaken with super capacitors to supplement or replace batteries for cars and SUVs. E-bikes developed in Switzerland in the late 1980s for the Tour de Sol solar vehicle race used solar charging stations initially on-vehicle and later fixed on roofs and connected so as to feed into the electric mains. The bicycles were then charged from the mains, as is common today.

=== Range ===
Range is a key consideration with e-bikes, and is affected by factors such as motor usage, degree of assistance chosen, battery capacity, speed, aerodynamics, rolling resistance, hills, as well as the weight of the bike and the rider. Almost all e-bikes function as regular bikes when the battery is depleted.

There are multiple ways of calculating the range an e-bike can achieve with a given battery capacity. Most manufacturers will provide a spread, claiming for example, 20km of continuous strong assist with steep hills, and 140km of intermittent gentle assist with slight hills.

Some models with hub motors use regenerative braking, pioneered in bicycles by the former Canadian company BionX. In regeneration mode, the motor operates in reverse, as a generator, to slow the bike down prior to the brake pads engaging, allowing some of the momentum to be turned back into electricity, slightly recharging the battery. This is useful for extending the range provided per charge and the life of brake hardware.

There were also range-extending experiments using fuel cells, e.g. the 2007 PHB.

== Design variations ==
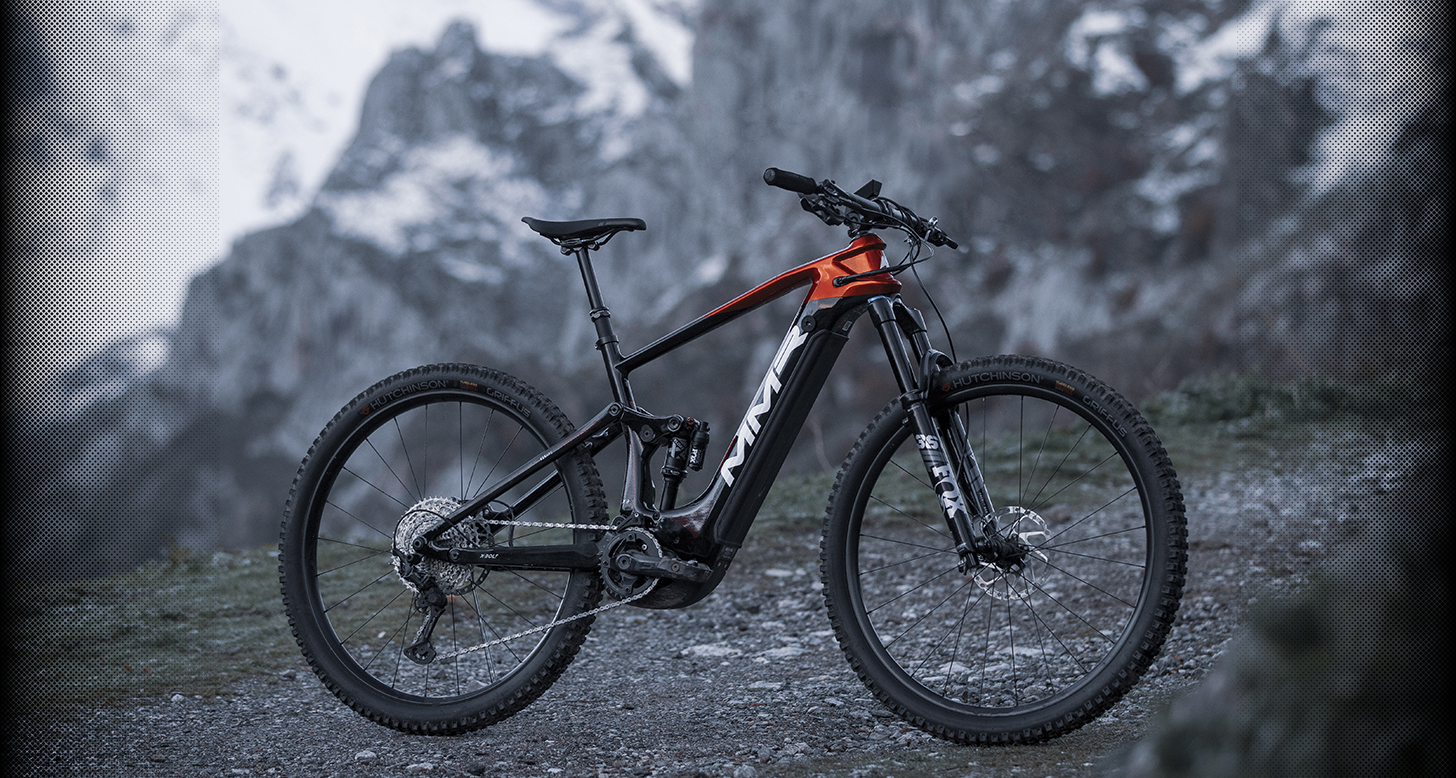
An electric mountain bike with a mid-drive motor and removable battery integrated into the frame.

e-bikes are available in all common bicycle designs, and a few more enabled by the electric power. Various models are available to ensure that the bikes meet local regulations.

Electric cargo bikes allow the rider to carry large, heavy items which would be difficult to transport without electric power supplementing the human power input. These bikes are also one way to enable the transportation of children on the parent's bike

Folding e-bikes allow for safe indoor storage as well as taking the bike on trains, busses, planes, and cars.

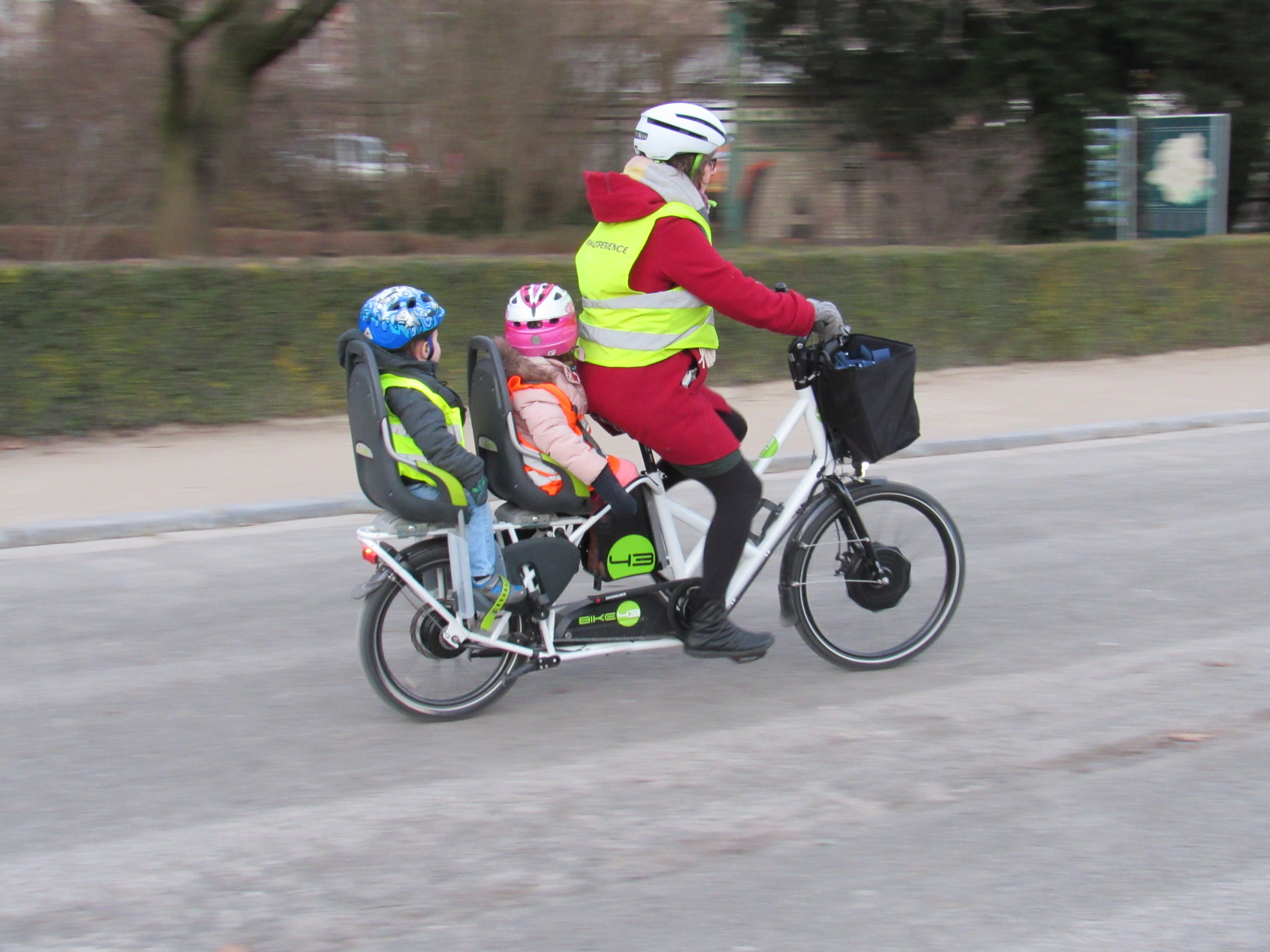
A woman carries 2 children on her "longtail" cargo e-bike.

Some e-bikes use fat tires for improved stability and off-road capability. e-bikes for professional and recreational mountain biking mostly use more common tire sizes. These mountain bikes are sometimes called EMTBs.

While most e-bikes come built with the display, battery, and motor integrated, it is possible to convert an existing bike to an e-bike. Cytronex is one conversion company that sells a small battery disguised as a water bottle. Numerous 'replace a wheel' solutions are available on the market but they do require some technical skill. Not every bicycle is built to be strong enough to handle electric power; and the cost of conversion kits isn't much lower than the cost of complete bikes. Custom-built and converted e-bikes are popular among enthusiasts who want adjustable settings and high speed. They are also commonly liked by people with a preference or disability-need for uncommon bike designs like recumbent tricycles.

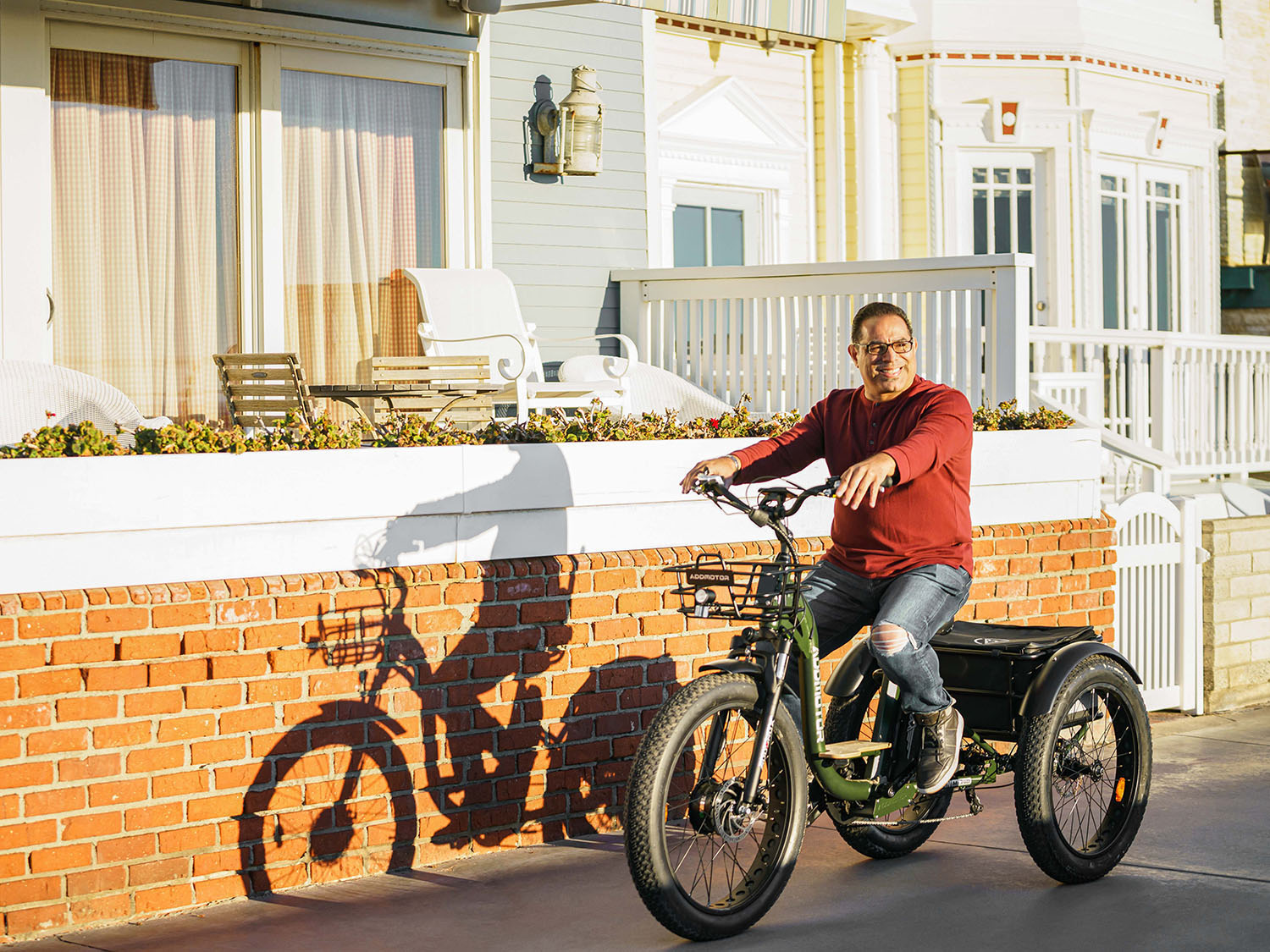
Man riding an etrike

=== Tricycles ===
Electric trikes are often favored by people with balance disabilities. Cargo-carrying tricycles are also gaining acceptance, with many couriers using them for package deliveries in city centers. Designs of etrikes exist between sleek lightweight sporting machines and pedal-operated micro-vans suitable for small businesses or efficient logistics.

=== Electric unicycles ===
A similar vehicle is an electric unicycle or "EUC." These lightweight machines combine well with public transport, including busses and trains and help solve the last mile problem. Various countries categorize EUCs differently which can affect if they are legal to ride on the road or sidewalk.

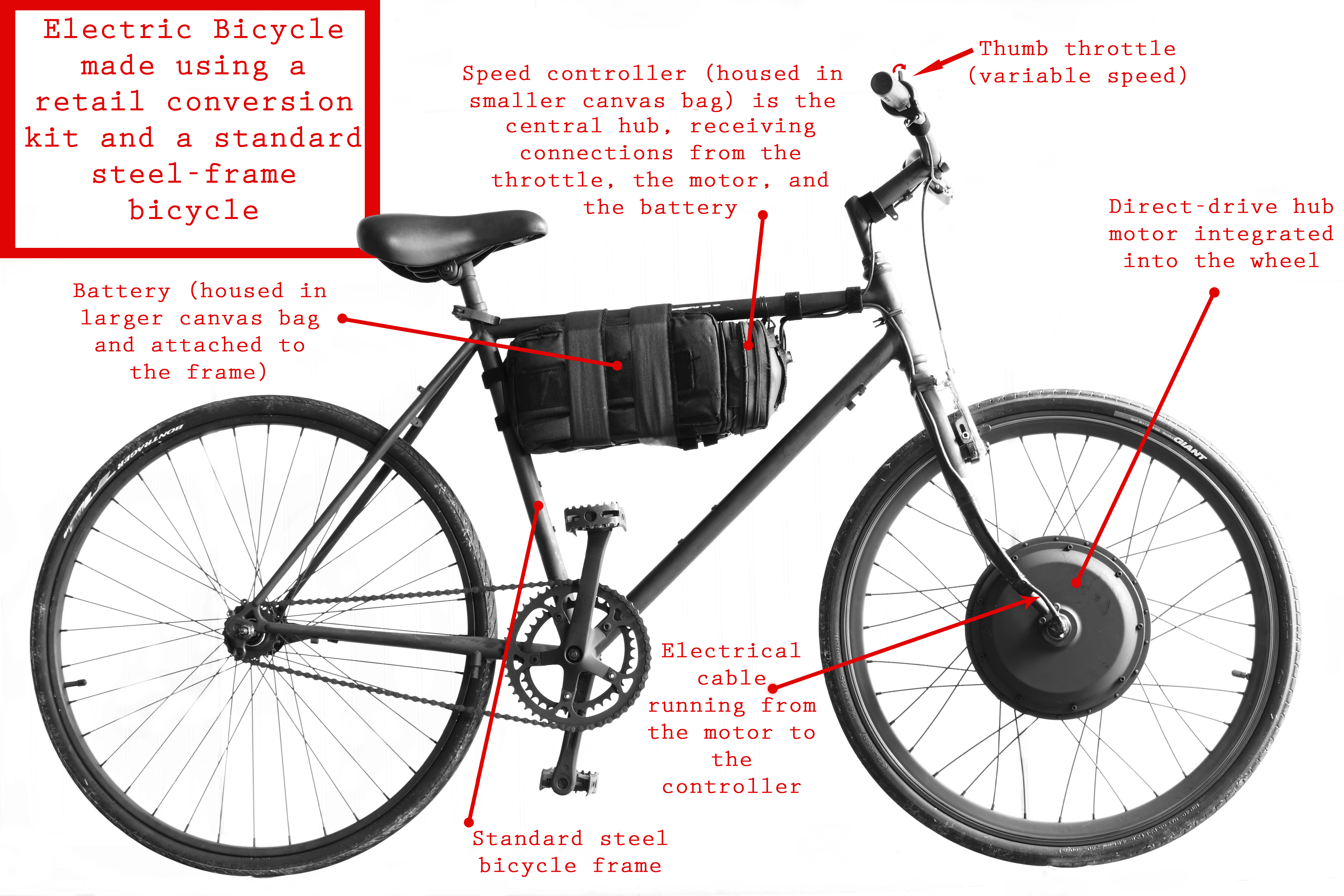
Diagram illustrating a standard bicycle converted to an e-bike using a retail conversion kit

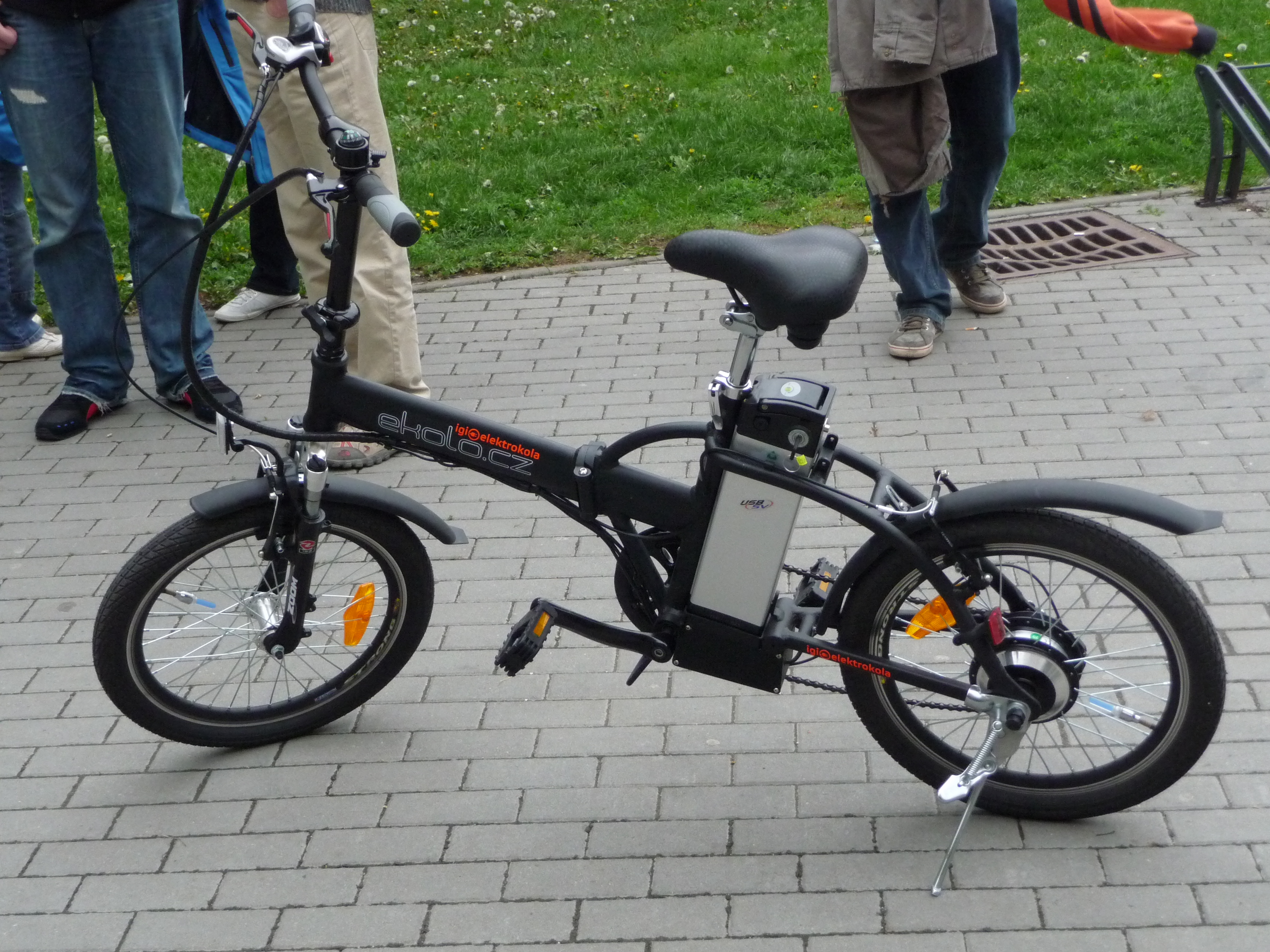
A folding e-bike

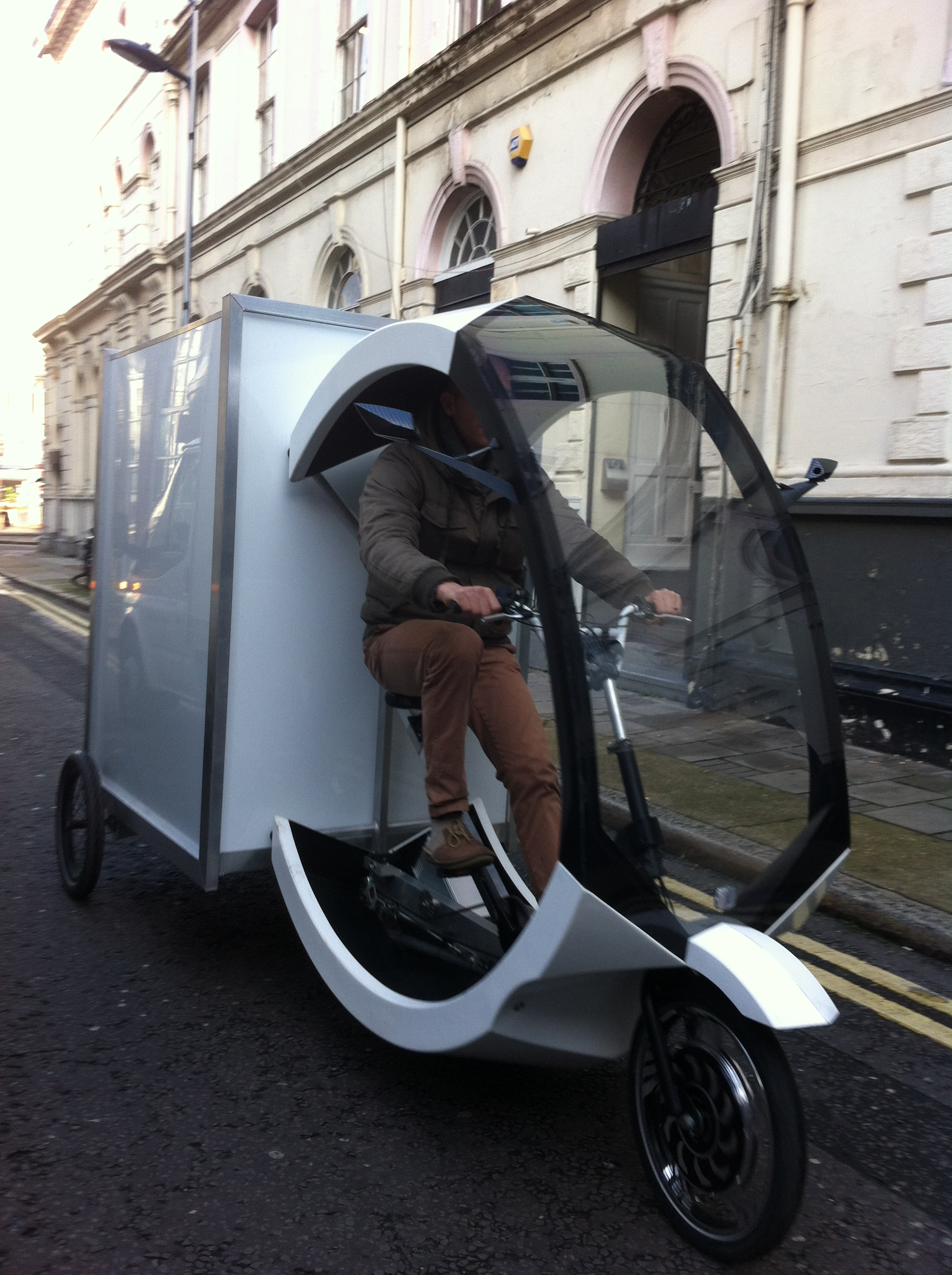
A modern electric cargo trike in use in London, with a payload of up to 250 kg (550 lb)

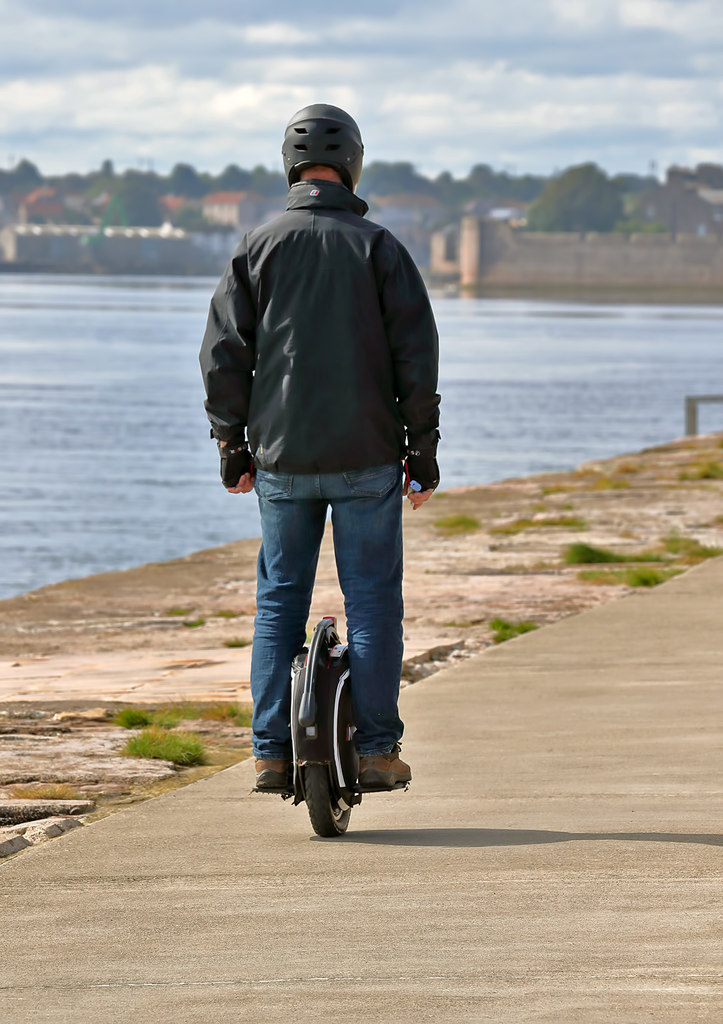
Electric unicycle

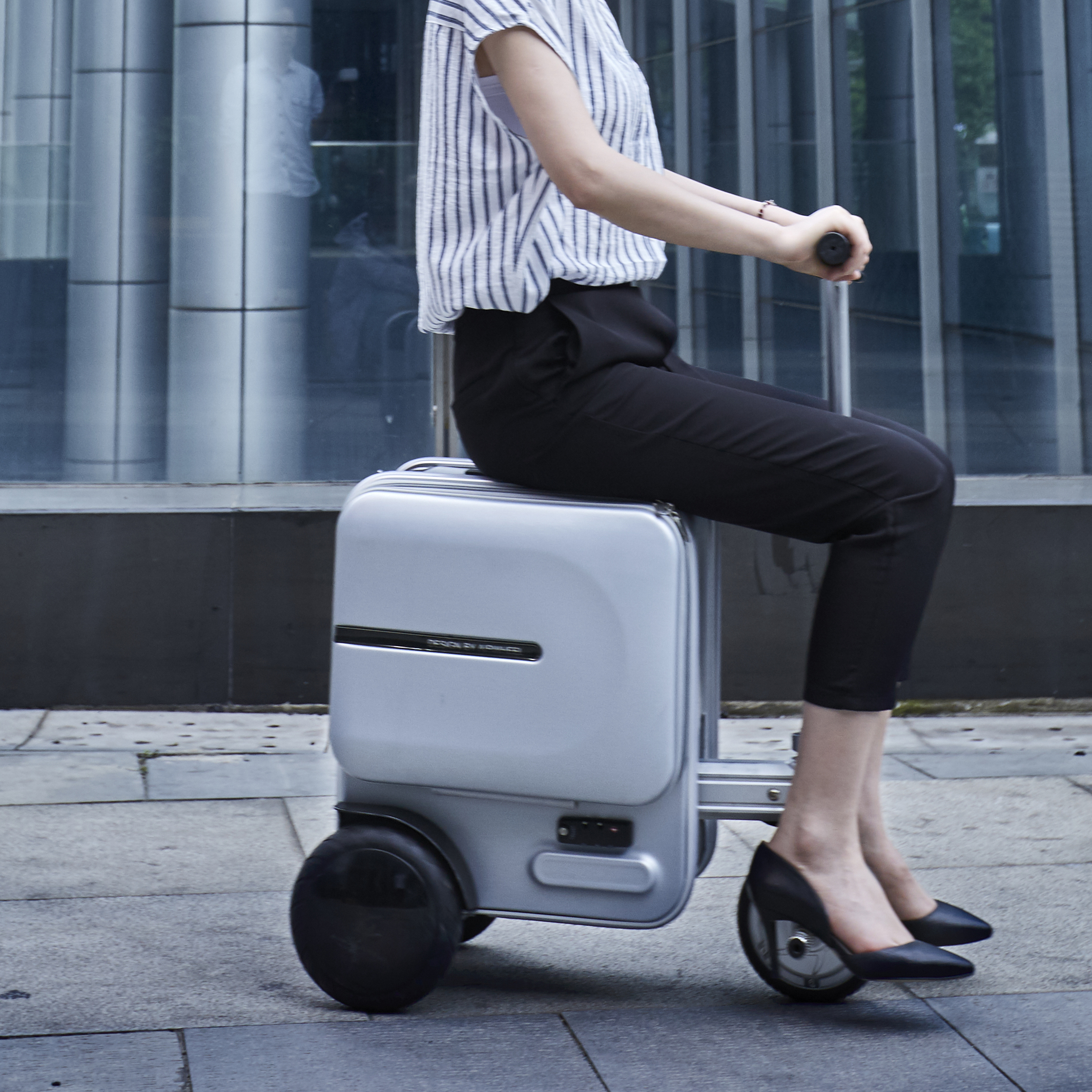
Some vehicles might not technically be an electric bicycle, but might be grouped in that category by transportation authorities.

== Health effects ==
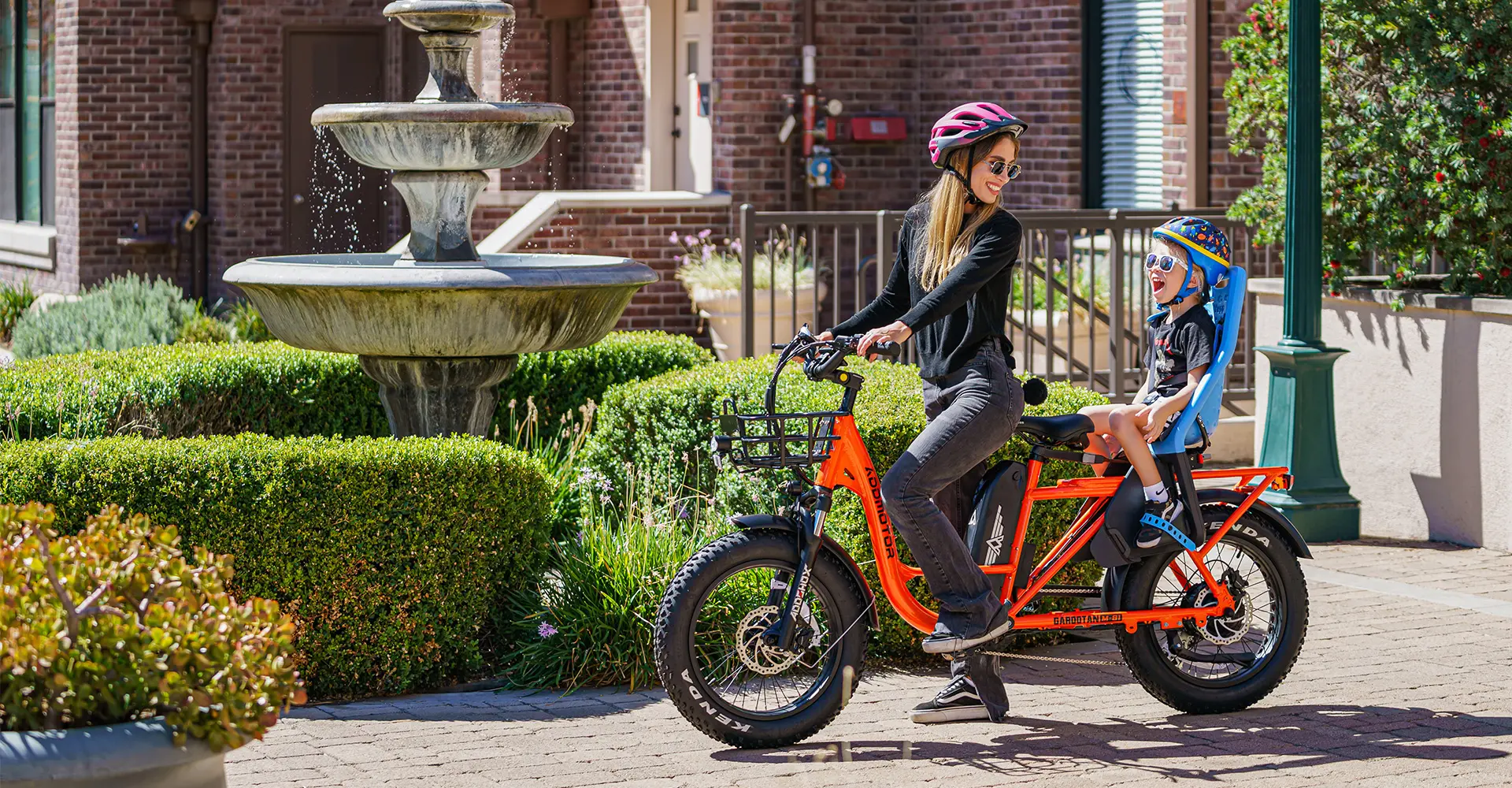
Electric bicycle usage can have several health benefits and rider safety can be improved through the use of a helmet.

One research study showed that E-bike use increased the amount of physical activity. E-bike users in seven European cities had 10% higher weekly energy expenditure than other cyclists because they cycled longer trips. However a study from the University of Tennessee provides evidence that energy expenditure (EE) and oxygen consumption (VO_{2}) for e-bikes are 24% lower than that for conventional bicycles, and 64% lower than for walking. Further, the study notes that the difference between e-bikes and bicycles are most pronounced on the uphill segments.

E-bikes can also provide a source of exercise for individuals who have trouble exercising for an extended time (due to injury or excessive weight, for example) as the bike can allow the rider to take short breaks from pedaling and also provide confidence to the rider that they'll be able to complete the selected path without becoming too fatigued or without having forced their knee joints too hard.

There are individuals who claim to have lost considerable amounts of weight by using an electric bike. A recent prospective cohort study as found that people using e-bikes have a higher BMI than those using conventional bikes. By making the biking terrain less of an issue, people who would not otherwise consider biking can use the electric assistance when needed and otherwise pedal as they are able.

E-bikes can be a useful part of cardiac rehabilitation programs, since health professionals will often recommend a stationary bike be used in the early stages of these. Exercise-based cardiac rehabilitation programs can reduce deaths in people with coronary heart disease by around 27%.

=== Road traffic safety ===
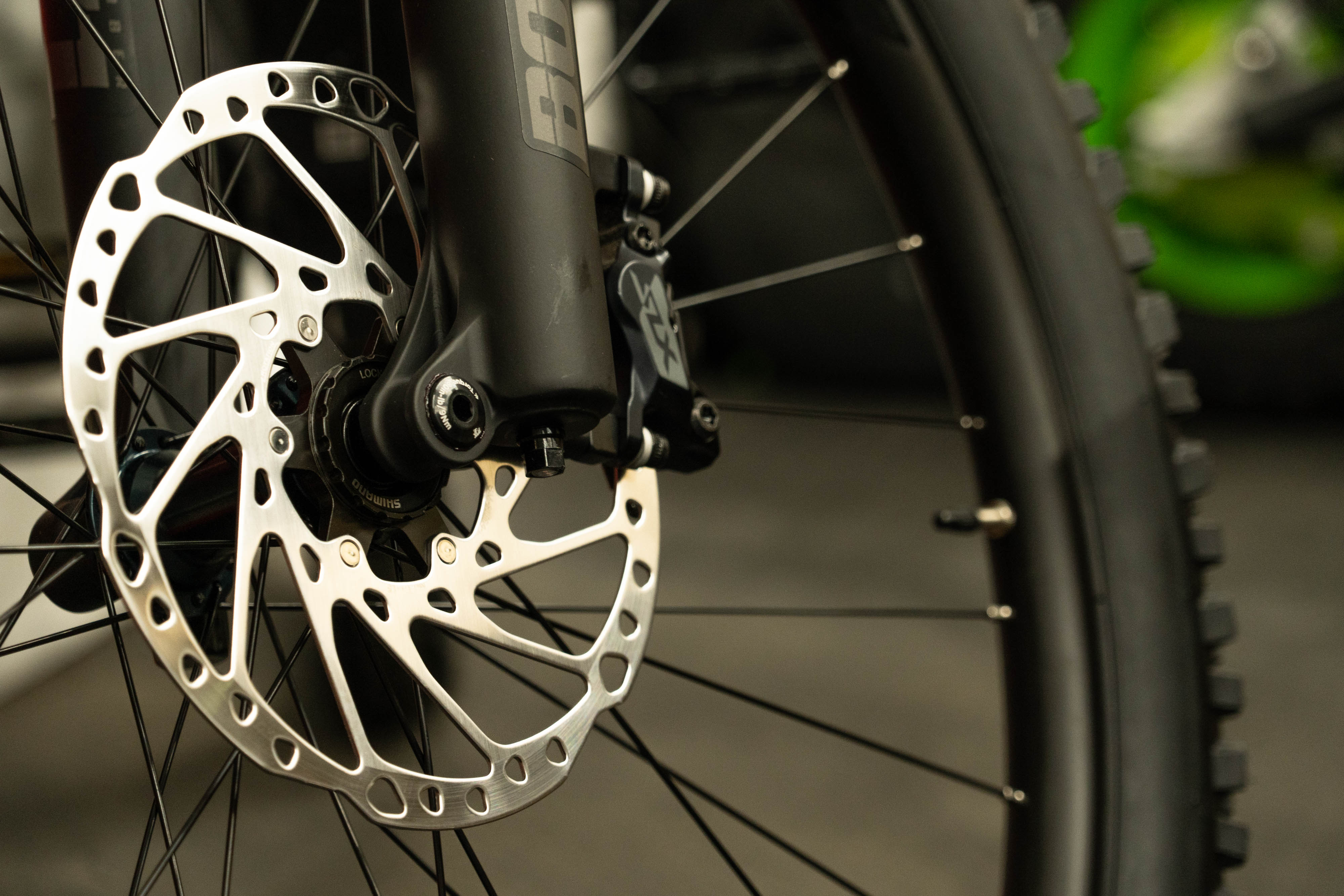
Ebikes usually come with hydraulic disc (shown here) or hydraulic rim brakes to provide stronger, more responsive, weather-resistant stopping power

E-bike safety is a concern when more and longer trips at higher speeds can lead to more accidents or more severe accidents. Car drivers may underestimate how fast a cyclist is moving or not expect them to approach from behind. An elderly person or young child may ride faster on a pedelec than previously possible. Risky situations can also arise at road exits and junctions. To illustrate the consequences of such critical situations, the German Insurers Accident Research (UDV) has conducted a research project with road tests, performance tests and crash tests for pedelecs.

On the other hand, many e-bike users report that they can ride more defensively with the auxiliary electric drive assisting them; unlike traditional bicyclists that tend to be averse to braking since this incurs effort to accelerate again, an e-bike rider can brake and then accelerate back to a normal speed with less effort. The Bavarian accident statistics for the first half of 2012 listed 6,186 accidents involving bicycles, of which 76 were e-bikes and notes that the accident risk of e-bikes is not higher than for other bicycles.

A 2014 study concluded that e-bike users in Germany were no more likely than conventional cyclists to be involved in "safety-critical situations". However, a 2015 study of Swedish cyclists concluded that e-bikers may be involved in more critical incidents but with "lower severity". Additionally, e-bikers were less likely to have dangerous interactions with motorized vehicles.

A 2021 study using data from the Netherlands found that speed-pedelecs have an increased risk of traffic conflict when speed-pedelec riders make use of bicycle facilities than when they ride on the roadway for cars. However, the consequences of crashes with cars on the roadway will probably be more severe for speed-pedelec riders than with traditional bicycles in bike lanes.

In the United States, an estimated 53,200 e-bike-related emergency department visits occurred between 2017 and 2022. During this period, there were 104 e-bike fatalities, accounting for 45% of all micromobility-related deaths. A California study of police-reported crashes from 2018 to 2024 found that e-bike injuries increased rapidly and, compared with conventional bicycle crashes, involved higher rates of moderate-to-severe injury, rider fault, unsafe-speed violations, and improper turning. Following a new state law, Assembly Bill 2234, cities in San Diego County can establish a minimum age for operating e-bikes.

The United States District Attorney launched the "RIDE SAFELY" unit in May 2026 to prosecute parents who let underage children ride illegal, high-speed vehicles. Multiple parents already face felony child endangerment and manslaughter charges stemming from crashes in March and April 2026, with over two dozen parental investigations remaining open as of August 2026.

== Environmental effects ==
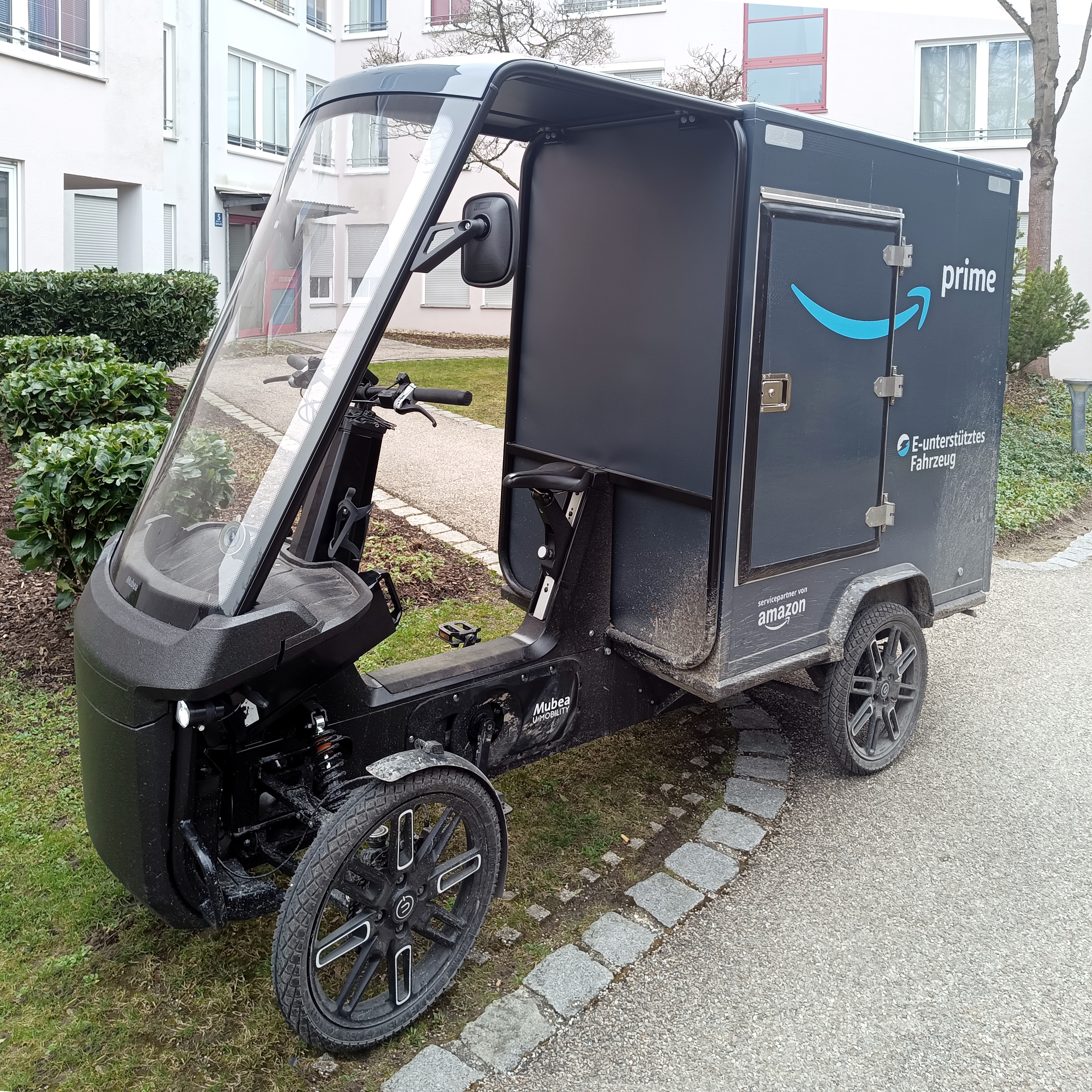
Delivery by e-bike can be more efficient in dense urban environments where parking is not always available for larger vehicles.

E-bikes are zero-emissions vehicles, as they emit no combustion by-products but the environmental effects of electricity generation, power distribution, as well as manufacturing and recycling batteries factor in to their contribution to carbon emissions.

A 2010 study on the environment impact of e-bikes versus other forms of transportation found that e-bikes are:

- 18 times more energy efficient than an SUV
- 13 times more energy efficient than a sedan
- 6 times more energy efficient than rail transit
- Of about equal impact to the environment as a conventional bicycle.

According to figures from a 2011 ECF publication, over their full life-cycle e-bikes on average emit 15 g CO₂e per passenger-km, less than for unmotorized cycles, which rate at 21 g because of the carbon cost of extra food calories spent. Other means of transport had higher figures, 50 g for driving an electric car alone or walking, or 100 g for buses with ten passengers. Buses with over 60 passengers would cluster with e-bikes. These comparisons are very approximate as the data varies considerably. For example, an e-bike rider eating beef might cause emissions of over 570 g CO₂e/km.

These emission rates are several times lower than motorcycles and cars. E-bikes are generally seen as environmentally desirable in an urban environment.

A 2018 study in England found that e-bikes, if used en masse to replace car travel, have the capability to "cut car carbon dioxide (CO_{2}) emissions in England by up to 50% (about 30 million tonnes per year)".

A 2020 study focusing on the Yorkshire region of England suggested that the greatest opportunities are in rural and sub-urban settings: city dwellers already have many low-carbon travel options, so the greatest impact would be on encouraging use outside urban areas. The study further suggested there may also be scope for e-bikes to help people who are most affected by rising transport costs.

The environmental effects involved in recharging the batteries can of course be reduced. The small size of the battery pack on an e-bike, relative to the larger pack used in an electric car, makes them very good candidates for charging via solar power or other renewable energy resources. Sanyo capitalized on this benefit when it set up "solar parking lots", in which e-bike riders can charge their vehicles while parked under photovoltaic panels.

The environmental credentials of e-bikes, and electric / human powered hybrids generally, have led some municipal authorities to use them, such as Little Rock, Arkansas, with their Wavecrest electric power-assisted bicycles or Cloverdale, California police with Zap e-bikes. China's e-bike manufacturers, such as Xinri, are now partnering with universities in a bid to improve their technology in line with international environmental standards, backed by the government who is keen to improve the export potential of the locally produced Chinese e-bikes.

Some land management regulators and mountain bike trail access advocates have argued for bans of electric bicycles on outdoor trails that are accessible to mountain bikes, citing potential safety hazards as well as the potential for electric bikes to damage trails. A study conducted by the International Mountain Bicycling Association, however, found that the physical impacts of low-powered pedal-assist electric mountain bikes (eMTB) may be similar to traditional mountain bikes (MTB).

There are strict shipping regulations for lithium-ion batteries, due to safety concerns. In this regard, lithium iron phosphate batteries are safer than lithium cobalt oxide batteries.

== Experience by country ==
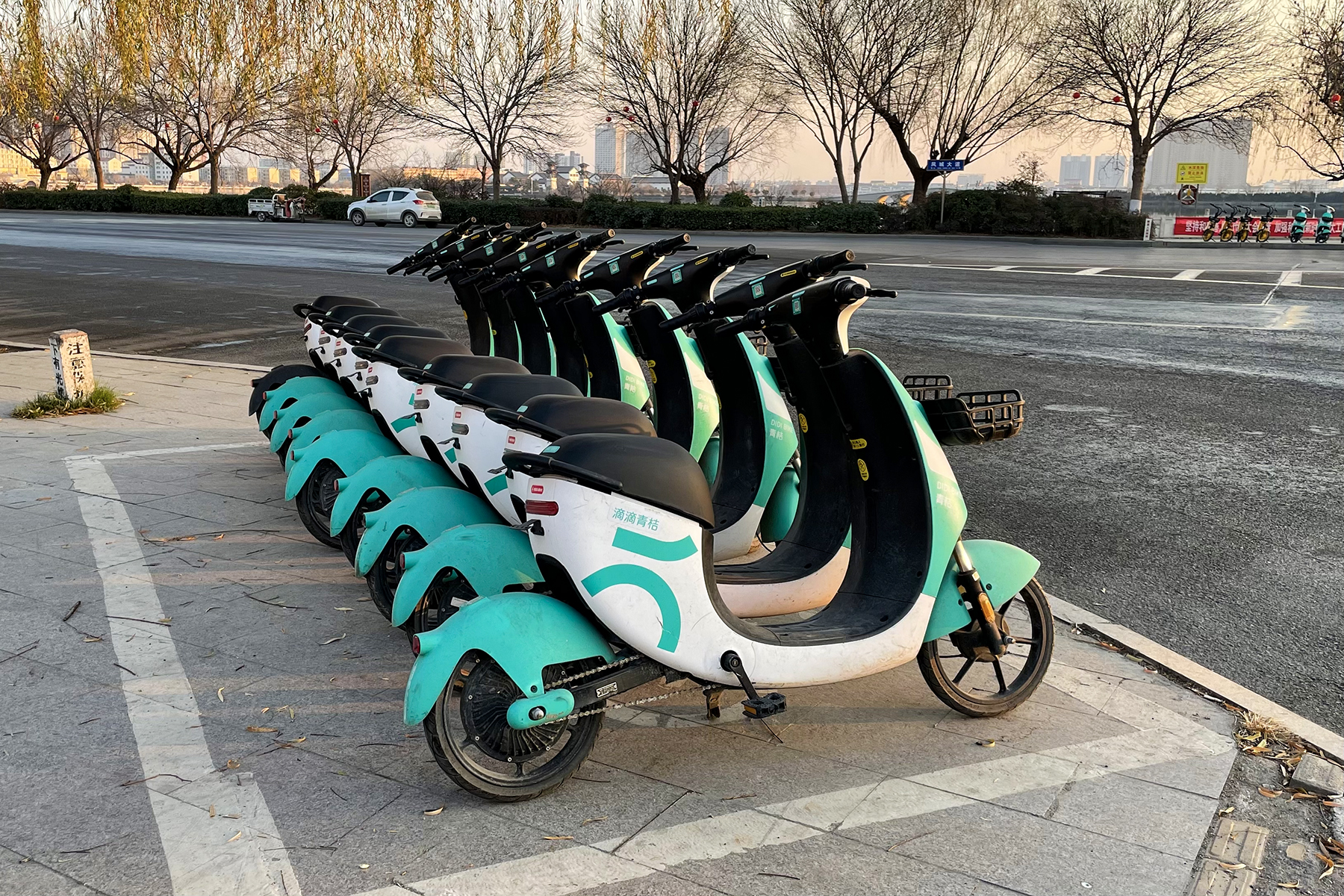
Legislation has led to more e-bike usage in China, with e-bike rentals catering to that growth.

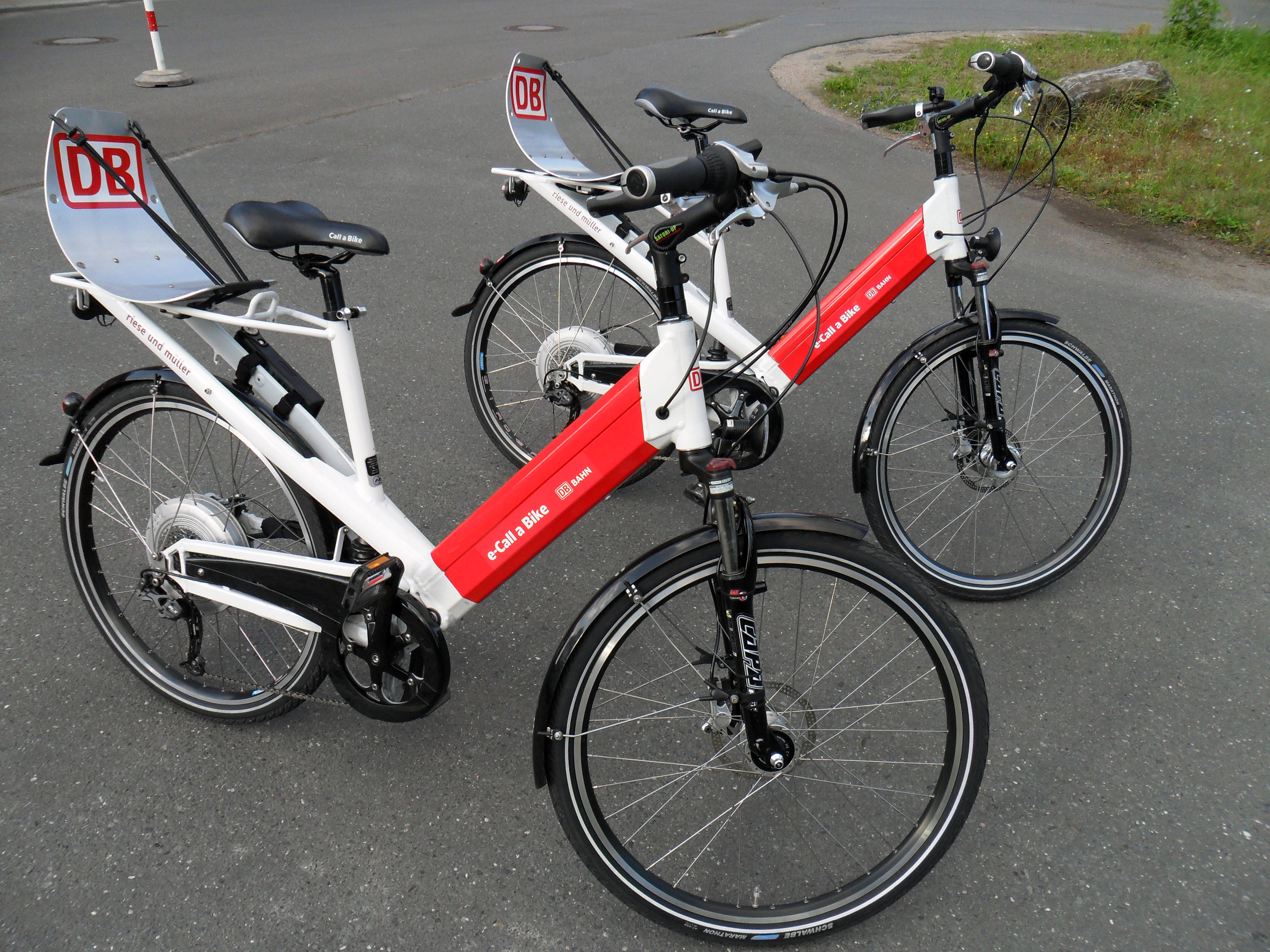
Pedelecs from the Call a Bike bicycle hire scheme in Berlin

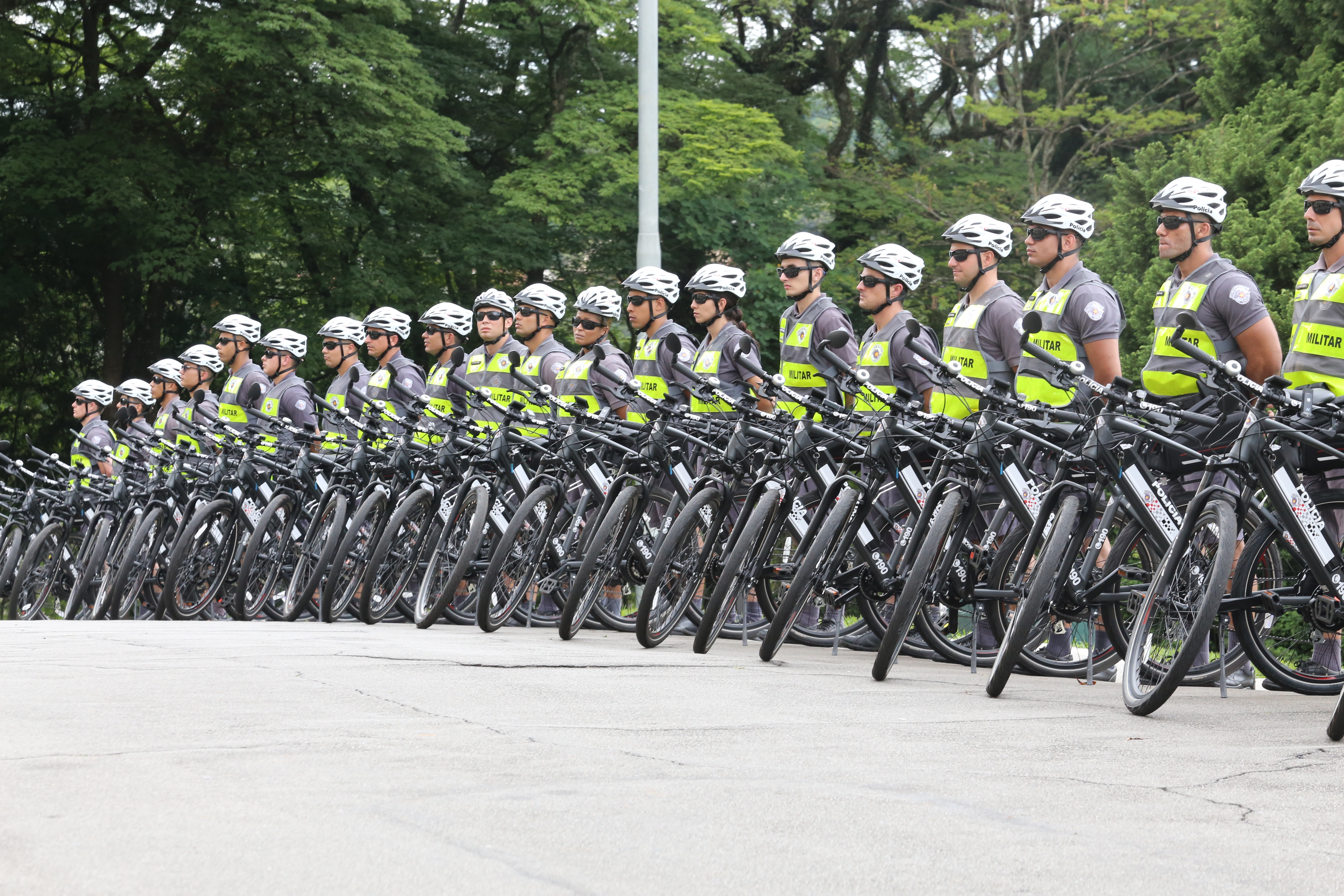
Police e-bikes in São Paulo, Brazil.

A delivery bike in Moscow, Russia with a license plate.

=== China ===
China has experienced an explosive growth of sales of non-assisted e-bikes including scooter type, with annual sales jumping from 56,000 units in 1998 to over 21 million in 2008, and reaching an estimated fleet of 120 million e-bikes in early 2010. This boom was triggered by Chinese local governments' efforts to restrict motorcycles in city centers to avoid traffic disruption and accidents. By late 2009 motorcycles, were banned or restricted in over ninety major Chinese cities. Commuters began replacing traditional bicycles and motorcycles and e-bike became an alternative to commuting by car. Nevertheless, road safety concerns continue as around 2,500 e-bike related deaths were registered in 2007. By late 2009, ten cities had also banned or imposed restrictions on e-bikes on the same grounds as motorcycles. Among these cities were Guangzhou, Shenzhen, Changsha, Foshan, Changzhou, and Dongguang.

In April 2019, China's regulatory policies changed, and new standards around electric bikes were introduced, governing a bicycle's weight, maximum speed and nominal voltage among other factors. Vehicles which apply the new standard, including international 25 km/h speed limit, are legally considered as bicycles and do not require registration. E-bikes out of this standard are considered as motorcycles and are subject to helmet and license regulation.

China is the world's leading manufacturer of e-bikes, with 22.2 million units produced in 2009. Some of the biggest manufacturers of E-bikes in the world are BYD and Geoby. Production is concentrated in five regions, Tianjin, Zhejiang, Jiangsu, Shandong, and Shanghai. China exported 370,000 e-bikes in 2009. In 2019, about 223,000 China companies were in businesses related to the electric-bike industry. As of 2025, there are 380 million registered e-bikes. New e-bikes must be made from fire resistant plastic, be at least 94.5% metal and have a max weight of 63kg.

=== Germany ===
As of 2012 there were about 600,000 e-bikes, mostly pedelecs, on the road in Germany. Growth had been spectacular: the year before, 310,000–340,000 were sold in Germany and this in turn was 55% more than in 2010. In comparison, there were around 70 million conventional bicycles in Germany in 2011 according to ZIV, the German Bicycle Industry Association.

By 2019 the yearly sales topped one million and in the year up to and including 2024 two million, slightly surpassing non-motorized bicycles from 2023 on.

=== India ===
In India electric bicycles market was valued at US$1.14 million in 2021, and is expected to reach US$2.31 million by 2027, projecting a compound annual growth rate of 12.69% during this forecast period.

=== Japan ===
Japan introduced e-bikes under a new pedelec-legislation (PAS-system) in 1994 and by mid-year Yamaha had sold 30,000 and by mid-1997 200,000.

Chart of sales per year for all manufacturers in japan:

Year	Number sold
2018	150,000
2019	180,000
2020	220,000
2021	250,000
2022	300,000
2023	350,000

=== Netherlands ===
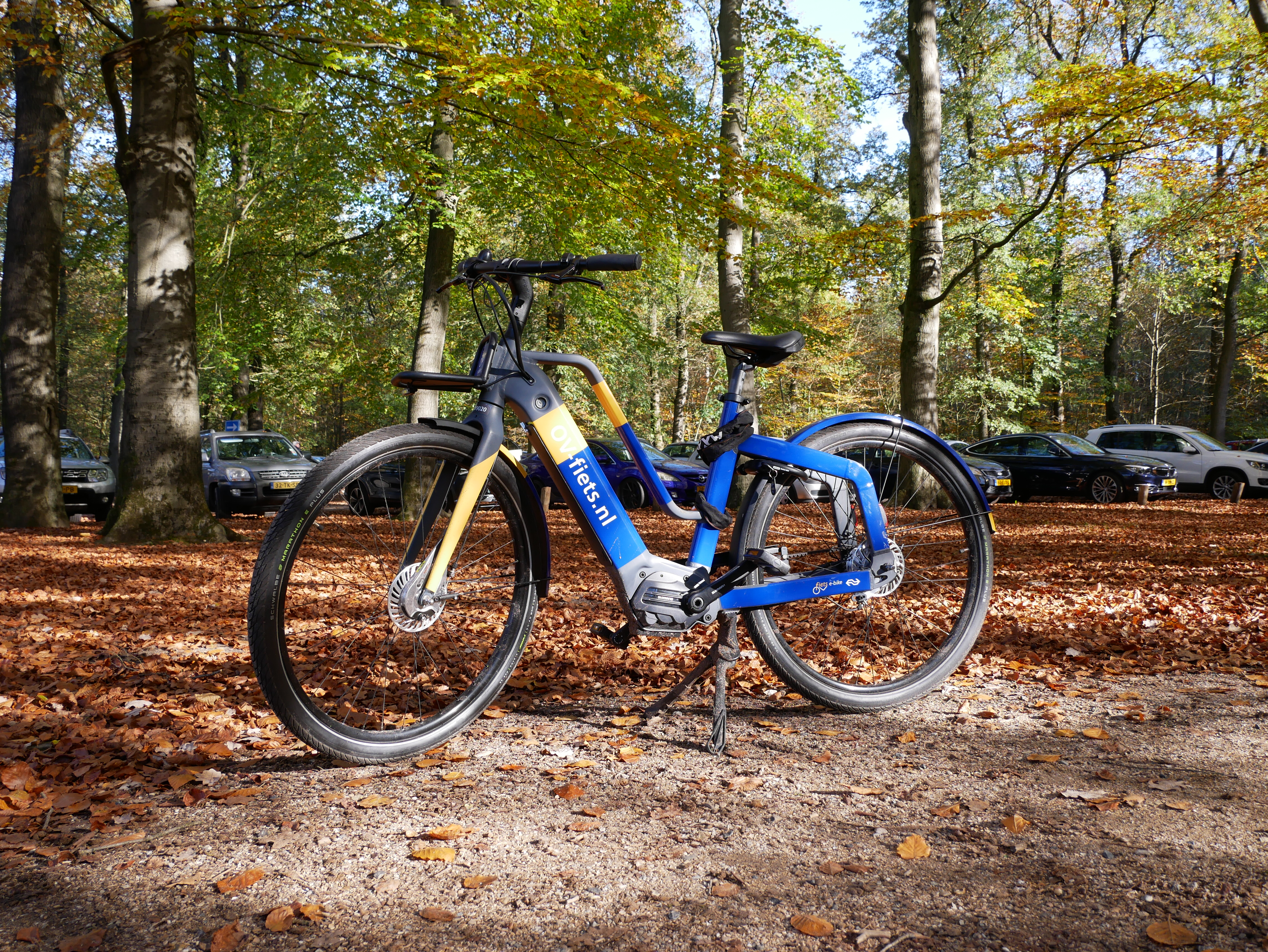
A bikeshare e-bike operated by OV-fiets in The Netherlands

The Netherlands has a world-record fleet of bicycles, with more bicycles in the country than people. 23 million bicycles for its population of 18 million (as of 2024). E-bikes reached a market share of 10% by 2009, as e-bikes sales quadrupled from 40,000 units to 153,000 between 2006 and 2009. By early 2010 one in every eight bicycles sold in the country is electric-powered despite the fact that on average an e-bike is three times more expensive than a regular bicycle. E-bike sales overtook those of unpowered bikes, reaching 547,000 new sales in 2020.

A 2008 market survey showed that the average distance traveled in the Netherlands by commuters on a standard bicycle is 6.3 km (3.9 mi) while with an e-bike this distance increases to 9.8 km (6.1 mi). This survey also showed that e-bike ownership is particularly popular among people aged 65 and over, but limited among commuters. The e-bike is used in particular for recreational bicycle trips, shopping and errands.

=== Switzerland ===
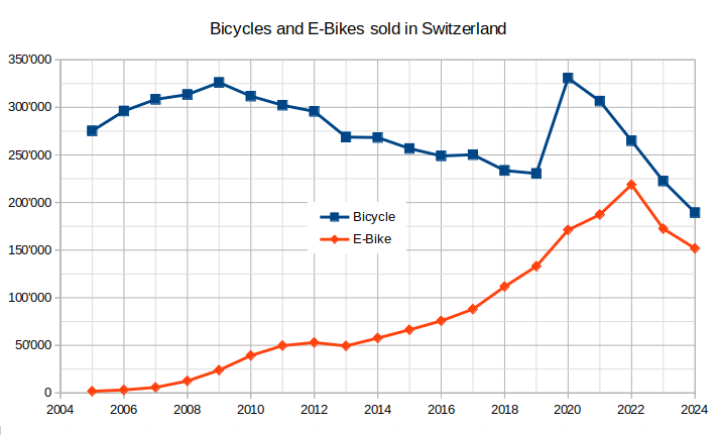
Bicycles and e-bikes sold between 2005 and 2024 in Switzerland

=== United States ===
In 2009 the U.S. had an estimated fleet of 200,000 e-bikes. In 2012 they were increasingly favored in New York as food-delivery vehicles. The North American Electric Bike Market is expected to grow at a CAGR of 10.13% from 2021 to 2028. Lawsuits have been put forward in San Diego County, California against manufacturers due to perceived deceptive marketing of electric motorcycles, which can reach speeds upwards of 60 miles per hour, as e-bikes.

== Use in warfare ==
Ukraine used donated e-bikes in the 2022 Russian invasion of Ukraine to transport light anti-tank weapons. This echoes past usage of bicycle infantry in wartime, particularly by Japanese forces.

== Gallery ==
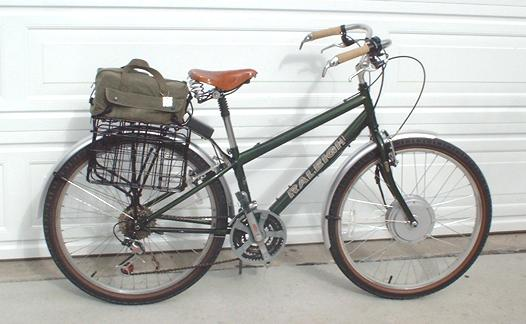
A bike equipped with an after market electric hub motor conversion kit, with the battery pack placed on the rear carrier rack

A delivery e-bike

== See also ==
- Active travel
- Electric unicycle
- Electric vehicle conversion
- Eurobike
- E-tricycle
- Fatbike
- List of electric bicycle brands and manufacturers
- Low-speed vehicle
- Moped
- Mountain bike
- Neighborhood electric vehicle
- Outline of cycling
- Renewable energy
- Timeline of transportation technology
- Twike
- E-scooter
- Personal electric vehicle (PEV)
